= Miss Korea =

National beauty pageant in Korea

Miss Korea 미스코리아
- Formation: 1957; 69 years ago
- Type: Beauty pageant
- Headquarters: Seoul
- Location: South Korea
- Official language: Korean
- Company: Global E&B
- Website: http://www.misskorea.or.kr

Miss Korea (Korean: 미스코리아) is a national beauty pageant in South Korea. The reigning Miss Korea is Woo Seo-yoon who was crowned on August 22, 2026.

== History ==
The first Miss Korea competition took place in 1953 and was organised by the Korean newspaper Chungang Ilbo. From 1957 onward, it was sponsored by the Hankook Ilbo (Korea Daily). Each year, approximately fifty women compete in Seoul, South Korea, and eight are selected by a panel of judges. The winner "Jin" (진) is crowned as the official Miss Korea. Additionally, there are "Seon" (선) finalists (equivalent to 1st runners-up), and "Mi" (미) finalists (equivalent to 2nd runners-up). Lastly, the sponsor title (equivalent to 3rd-7th runners-up) are chosen. Since 2025, new titles have been added 'Ye' (예) (equivalent to 3rd runners-up) and 'Jae' (재) (equivalent to 4th runners-up).

On March 16, 2011, the president of the Miss World Organization, Julia Morley, announced the newly launched Miss World Korea pageant. Until 2010, Miss Korea would also select the representative to Miss World, but starting with Miss World 2011, a separate competition has been held to choose the contestant who will represent Korea.

Since 2015, it has been co-hosted by Hankook Ilbo and Hanju E&M, since 2018 it has been co-hosted by Hankook Ilbo and Hankook Ilbo E&B, a subsidiary of Hankook Ilbo, and since 2021, it has been hosted by Global E&B (formerly Hankook Ilbo E&B). Since 2016, Miss Korea organization no longer send South Korea's representative to Miss Universe.

In 2022, Mina Sue Choi represented Korea at the 22nd Miss Earth pageant, which was held in Parañaque, Philippines on November 29, 2022, and eventually won the crown, making Korea's first ever victory on any of the big four international beauty pageants.

Until 2024, Miss Korea would also select the representative to Miss International, but starting with Miss International 2025, Korean representatives at the Miss International are chosen in a separate pageant Korea Beauty Pageant Organization (KBO). Until 2024, Miss Korea would also select the representative to Miss Earth, but starting with Miss Earth 2025, Korean representative for Miss Earth will be selected through the Miss Earth Korea pageant. Miss Korea is no longer participating as a representative of Korea.

== International Crowns ==
Number of wins under Miss Korea
Pageant	Title	Winning year(s)
Miss Earth	1	2022
Miss Asia Pacific International	3	1969 • 1995 • 2002
Miss Tourism Queen of the Year International	1	2010
Miss Asia Contest	1	1963

The following are the Miss Korea titleholders throughout the years.

- One — Miss Earth winner:
  - Mina Sue Choi (2022)
- Three — Miss Asia Pacific International winner:
  - Seo Won-Kyoung (1969) • Yoon Mi-jung (1995) • Kim So-yoon (2002)
- One — Miss Tourism Queen of the Year International winner:
  - Ha Hyun-jung (2010)
- One — Miss Asia Contest winner:
  - Choi In-ja (1963)

== Placements at international pageants ==
This is Miss Korea's placement in the international pageants.

=== Past licenses ===
- 8 placements at Miss Universe. The highest placement is Jang Yoon-jeong as 1st Runner-up of Miss Universe 1988.
- 8 placements at Miss World. The highest placement is Choi Yeon-hee as 1st Runner-up of Miss World 1988.
- 26 placements at Miss International. The highest placement is Son Tae-young, Seo Eun-mi as 1st Runner-up of Miss International 2000, Miss International 2009.
- 9 placements at Miss Earth. The highest placement is Mina Sue Choi as Miss Earth 2022.
- 1 placements at Miss Supranational. The highest placement is You Soo-jung as Top 20 of Miss Supranational 2010.
- 1 placements at Miss Intercontinental. The highest placement is Cha Ye-rin as Top 15 of Miss Intercontinental 2009.
- 14 placements at Miss Asia Pacific International. The highest placement is Seo Won-Kyoung, Yoon Mi-jung, Kim So-yoon as Miss Asia Pacific International 1969, 1995, 2002.
- 3 placements at Miss Tourism Queen of the Year International. The highest placement is Ha Hyun-jung as Miss Tourism Queen of the Year International 2010.

== Titles ==
Number of wins from Miss Korea (past licenses)
Pageant	Wins
Female international beauty pageants:
Miss Universe	0
Miss World	0
Miss International	0
Miss Earth	1
Miss Supranational	0
Miss Intercontinental	0
Miss Asia Pacific International	3
Miss Tourism Queen of the Year International	1
Miss Asia Contest	1
Miss Young International	0
Queen of the Pacific	0
Miss Wonderland	0
Miss International Pacific Pearl	0
Miss Flower Queen	0
Miss All Nations	0
Miss International Blueberry	0
Miss International Beauty	0
Male international beauty pageants:
Manhunt International	0
Mister World	0

Note that the year designates the time Miss Korea has acquired that particular pageant franchise.

Past

- Miss Universe (1957–2015)
- Miss World (1959–2010)
- Miss International (1960–2024)
- Miss Earth (2002–2024)
- Miss Supranational (2010)
- Miss Intercontinental (1977–1978, 2009–2010)
- Miss Asia Pacific International (1968–2005)
- Miss Tourism Queen of the Year International (2010–2012)
- Miss Asia Contest (1963)
- Miss Young International (1970–1983)
- Queen of the Pacific (1970–1977)
- Miss Wonderland (1987–1989)
- Miss International Pacific Pearl (1987)
- Miss Flower Queen (1990)
- Miss All Nations (1990)
- Miss International Blueberry (2012)
- Miss International Beauty (2009)
- Mister World (2010)
- Manhunt International (2010)

== Titleholders ==
Year	Jin (Winner) Truth	Runners-Up			Special Awards, Semi, Participant	Final Entrants
Year	Jin (Winner) Truth	Seon (First) Goodness/Kindness	Mi (Second) Beauty	Sponsor Title & Ye, Jae (Third-Seventh)	Special Awards, Semi, Participant	Final Entrants
1957	Park Hyun-ok	Kim Jung-ok	Hong In-bang	Not awarded		7
1958	Oh Geum-sun	Jung Yeon-ja	Kim Mi-ja	Not awarded		13
1959	Oh Hyun-ju	Jung Ok-yi	Seo Jung-ae	Na In-duck		18
1960	Son Mi-hee-ja	Kim Jung-ja	Lee Young-hee	Park Soo-ja, Jang In-ja, Kim Mi-ja, Kim Ja-hyun		29
1961	Seo Yang-hee	Lee Ok-ja	Hyun Chang-ae	Lim Young-bin, Lim Mi-ae, Um Soon-young, Lee Myung-ju		29
1962	Seo Bum-ju	Sohn Yang-ja	Chung Tae-ja	Song Hye-ja, Lim Gyeong-sil, Choi In-ja, Jung Eui-ja		22
1963	Kim Myoung-ja	Choi Yoo-mi	Choi Keum-shil	Kim Hye-won, Kang Kyung-rim, Kim Erisa, Shin Jung-hwa	Yoon Jung-hee	47
1964	Shin Jung-hyun	Lee Hye-jin (real name: Lee Kwang-ja)	Yoon Mi-hee	Moon Sun-ja, Choi Seung-ja, Lee Su-jin, Choi Jung-yeon		43
1965	Kim Eun-ji	Kim Min-jin (real name: Kim Kyoung-sook)	Lee Eun-ah	Jang Hye-kyung, MoH Seong-yang, Lee Sook-young, Choi Su-ah		56
1966	Yoon Gwi-young	Jin Hyun-soo	Chung Eul-sun	Lim Soo-hyang, Lee Bong-bun, Kim Young-sun, Lee Myung-sook		33
1967	Hong Joung-ae	Choi Yang-ji	Chung Young-hwa	Son Eun-jeong, Kim Yun, Kim Chun-jin, Kim Jeong-suk		33
1968	Kim Yoon-jung	Kim Hee-ja	Lee Ji-eun	Jang Moon-jung, Bang In-sook, Jang Hye-sun, Jin Kyung-ye		38
1969	Lim Hyun-jung; ~~Kim Ji-yeon~~ (Original Jin)	Kim Yoo-kyoung (real name: Kim Sung-ja)	Kim Seung-hee	Lim Jeong-eun, Seo Won-kyung, Lee Joo-hee		40
1970	Yoo Young-ae	Kim In-sook	Lee Jung-hee	Lee Eun-ja, Kim Kyung-soon, Lee Ji-su, Park Ji-eun		35
1971	Noh Mi-ae	Choi Sook-ae	Cha Soon-young	Hong Shin-hee, Lee Young-eun, Jo Ae-ja, Lee Myung-shin		32
1972	Park Yeon-joo	Suh Yun-hee (real name: Suh Ae-ja)	Shin Ga-jung	Bae Jung-ja, Jung Geum-ok, Oh Young-eun, Kim Seong-sil, Lee In-sook		32
1973	Kim Young-ju	Kim Mae-ja	Kim Jun-kyung	Park Shin-hwa, Lee Tae-hyun, Ahn Soon-young, Lee Hye-sook		33
1974	Kim Eun-jung (real name: Kim Jae-kyu)	Kim Kyung-ok	Shim Kyoung-sook	Kim Tae-hee (Kim Ji-hyun), Kang Young-sook, Lee Hee-young, Kim Hye-kyung		32
1975	Seo Ji-hye (real name: Seo Young-ok)	Lee Sung-hee, Lee Yeon-ok	Lee Hyang-mok, No Deok-ja, Jin Sook	Lee Kyung-ah, Kim Hyun-young		31
1976	Chung Kyung-sook	Chung Kwang-hyun, Han Young-ae	Cha Jang-ok, Shin Byoung-sook, Lee Hye-kyung	Jo In-ok, Yoo Jae-sun		27
1977	Kim Sung-hee	Lee Jung-hwa, Jung Jung-hwa	Kim Young-sun, Shin Byoung-ok, Kim Soon-ae	Baek Kyung-sun, Jung Mi-hee		29
1978	Son Jung-eun	Chae Jung-sook, Park Kyung-ae	Kim Eun-hee, Je Eun-jin, Park Sook-jae	Choi Ah-hyun, Lee Soo-mi		34
1979	Seo Jae-hwa	Hong Yeo-jin	Kim Jin-sun	Lee Joo-yeon, Kim Mi-ho		34
1980	Kim Eun-jung	Chang Sun-ja (real name: Chang Hye-ji)	Kim Hye-ran	Jung Na-young, Kang Min-jung		37
1981	Lee Eun-jung	Lee Han-na	Kim So-hyung	Kim Jong-sook, Park Hyun-joo	Kim Wan-joong	33
1982	Park Sun-hee	Choi Sung-yoon	Lee Hyun-joo	Kim Mi-sun, Jung Ae-hee		37
1983	Lim Mi-sook	Kim Sun-mi	Seo Min-sook	Oh Sook-hee, Jung Young-soon, Kim Jong-joong	Choi Mi-seon, Lee Jong-nam, Lee Mi-kyung	34
1984	Choi Young-ok	Kim Kyoung-ree	Chang Sih-wha	Lim Ji-yeon, Park Eun-kyung, Lee Joo-hee	Yoon Tae-young	35
1985	Bae Young-ran	An Jung-mi	Kim Yoon-jung	Choi Eun-hee, Seo Hyun-kyung, Lim Myeong-sook	Joo Dong-mi, Joo Ri-hye	38
1986	Kim Ji-eun	Chung Wha-sun	Chung Myoung-sun	Kwon Min-kyung, Oh Soo-kyung, Lee Hye-jung, Min Sun-kyung	Jeong Soo-bin, Joo Jin-ok	39
1987	Jang Yoon-jeong	Choi Yeon-hee	Kim Mi-rim	Lee Yoon-hee, Kim Hee-yeon, Jang Hye-young, Lee Ji-yeon, Hwang Bo-kyung	Kim Dong-nyeon, Kang Joo-hyun	57
1988	Kim Sung-ryung	Kim Hye-ri	Kim Hee-jung	Chae hwa-jung, Yang Hyun-jung, Choo Young-mi, Kim Yu-na, Oh Hyun-ju	Jo Yeon	42
1989	Oh Hyun-kyung	Go Hyun-jung	Lee Yun-young	Shin So-young (Shin Soh-geum), Chae Kyung-jin, Jo Ae-sun, Kim Mi-jin, Jang Young-hee		40
1990	Seo Jung-min	Kim Tae-hwa	Yoon Je-sun	Lee Seung-eun, Kwon Jung-ju, Kim Hyun-sook, Kang Eun-sook, Lee Hye-jung	Yang Jung-a, Lee Jong-hee, Kim Kyung-sook	39
1991	Lee Young-hyun	Yum Jung-ah	Lee Mi-young	Kim Hyun-ju, Lee Sun-hye, Jang Mi-young, Jeon Hye-jin, Soh Young-kyung		40
1992	Yoo Ha-young	Chang Eun-young	Lee Seung-yeon	Seo Yeon-jung, Woo Jung-ah, Kim In-young, Gu Gyo-hyeon, Lee Jung-hee	Kim Nam-joo, Kim Joo-hee, Jang Hye-sook	40
1993	Goong Sun-young	Huh Sung-soo	Kim Young-ah	Chae Yeon-hee, Yoon Su-jin, Jang Mi-ho, Jung Ji-young, Son Su-mi	Hwang Jin-ah, Jang Jin-young, Kang Joo-eun, Moon Su-jin, Lee Eun-jeo, Choi Hye-kyung, Kim Yu-ra, Kim So-hyung	40
1994	Han Sung-ju	Lee Yoo-ree, Yoon Mi-jung	Kim Mi-sook, Kim Ye-boon, Sung Hyun-ah	Jeon Min-sun, Choi Myeong-yeon	Go Joo-hee, Park Jeong-seong	34
1995	Kim Yun-jung	Choi Yoon-young, Kim Jung-hwa	Kim Min-jung, Kim Ah-rin, Han Sung-won	Lee Kyung-sook, Lim Ju-yeon	So Soo-young, Kim Yun-hee, Song Soo-young	36
1996	Lee Eun-hee	Seol Soo-jin, Kim Ryang-hee	Choi Suk-young, Lee Ji-hee, Choi Jung-yoon	Lee Ja-young, Kwon Min-joong	Park Yun-hyeon, Yoon Won-hee	38
1997	Kim Ji-yeon	Cho Hye-young, Kim Jin-ah	Lim Sun-hong, Yeo Hye-jeon, Jung Eun-joo	Ham So-won, Jo Yoon-ju	Jeon Hye-jin, Lee Yun-hee, Hong Chung-min	40
1998	Choi Ji-hyun	Kim Kun-woo, Lee Jae-won	Lee Jung-min, Yang So-hyun, Choi Yoon-hee	Lee Jung-hee, Kwak Shin-hye		45
1999	Kim Yeon-ju	Han Na-na	Seol Soo-hyun	Kim Hyo-ju, Kang Ok-mi, Lee Hye-won, Son Hye-im	Yoon Hye-kyung, Lisa Kim, Park Ga-young, Ahn Bok-hee	47
2000	Kim Sa-rang	Shin Jung-sun	Son Tae-young	Jang Eun-jin, Son Min-ji, Park Si-yeon (Park Mi-sun), Park So-yoon	Lee Bo-young, Yoon Jung-hee, Lee Mi-jin, Kim Mi-seong	46
2001	Kim Min-kyoung	Seo Hyun-jin	Baek Myoung-hee	Go Yun-mi, Kim Ji-hye, Jung Ah-reum, Han Ji-won	Park Hyun-sook, Park Jae-yeon	48
2002	Keum Na-na	Chang Yoo-kyoung	Gi Yun-ju	Lee Jin-ah, Kim So-yoon, Lee Jae-nam, Kim Yeon-su	Diane Jung, Kim Song-hee	48
2003	Choi Yun-young	Park Ji-ye, Shin Ji-su	Ahn Choon-young, Oh Yoo-mi, Yang Hye-sun	Lee So-hoon	Ryu Mi-ju, Kang Ae-ja, Kwon Hyeon-ji, Park Seong-hee	43
2004	Kim So-young	Han Kyoung-jin	Kim In-ha	Cho Hye-jin, Choi Young-ah, Kim Hye-yeon	Kim Ji-in, Jo So-hyun, Jeong Kyeong-jin, Arden Cho	45
2005	Kim Joo-hee	Oh Eun-young, Lee Kyoung-eun	Yoo Hye-mi, Kim Eun-ji, Yoo Hye-ri	Kim Jeong-hyun	Park Si-hyeon, Kim Sook-young	42
2006	Lee Ha-nui	Park Sharon, Jang Yun-seo	Park Hee-jung, Kim Yoo-mi, Park Sung-min, Kim Soo-hyun	Not awarded	Hwang Ha-na, Lim Mi-jeong	45
2007	Lee Ji-seon	Cho Eun-ju, Park Ka-won	Lee Jin, Yoo Ji-eun, ~~Kim Joo-yeon~~, Lee Jae-ah	Not awarded	jeon cho-long, Kim Eun-young, Yu Han-na, Seong Min-ah	45
2008	Na Ry	Kim Min-jeong, Choi Bo-in	Seo Seol-hee, Lee Yoon-ah, Chang Yun hee, ~~Kim Hee-kyung~~	Not awarded	Lee ka-ni, Lim Hye-rim	39
2009	Kim Joo-ri	Cha Ye-rin, Seo Eun-mi	Park Ye-ju, Yoo Soo-jung, Lee Seul-ki, Choi Ji-hee	Not awarded	Wang Ji-hye, Sa gong-jin	46
2010	Jung So-ra	Jang Yoon-jin, Kim Hye-young	Ko Hyun-young, Lee Gui-joo, Ha Hyun-jung, Ahn Da-hye	Not awarded	Kim Soo-hyun, Yu ri-na, Jung Ji-eun	46
2011	Lee Seong-hye	Kim E-seul, Kim Hye-sun	Gong Pyung-hee, Kim Soo-jung, Nam Mi-yeon, Lee Semina	Not awarded	Lee Seul-ah, Jee-Yoon Yi	45
2012	Kim Yu-mi	Lee Jung-bin, Kim Sa-ra	Kim Young-joo, Kim Na-yeon, Kim Tae-hyun, Kim Yoo-jin	Not awarded	Kim Yu-ri, Jung Soo-mi	57
2013	Yoo Ye-bin	Han Ji-eun, Kim Hyo-hee	Koo Bon-hwa, Choi Hye-rin, Han Soo-min, Kim Min-joo, Choi Song-yi	Not awarded	Hwang Hae-na, Choi Yu-na	53
2014	Kim Seo-yeon	Lee Seo-bin, Shin Su-min	Kim Myeong-seon, Lee Sarah, Baek Ji-hyun, Ryu So-ra	Not awarded	Wang Hyun, Cho Se-whee, Kim Nam-hee	49
2015	Lee Min-ji	Kim Ye-rin, Kim Jeong-jin	Han Ho-jeong, ~~Choi Myung-kyung~~, So A-reum, Park Ah-reum	Not awarded	Son So-hee, Ahn Hye-ryeong	30
2016	Kim Jin-sol	Shin Ara, Moon Da-hyun	Lee Young-in, Hong Na-shil, Lee Chae-young, Kim Min-jeong	Not awarded	Jang Whee, Yoon So-yoon, Kim Na-kyung	34
2017	Seo Jae-won	Lee Han-na, Jung Da-hye	Lee Soo-yeon, Nam Seung-woo, Kim Sa-rang, ~~Pi Hyun-ji~~	Not awarded	Kim Ha-neul, Kim Ji-yoon	33
2018	Kim Soo-min	Song Su-hyun, Seo Ye-jin	Lee Yoon-ji, Kim Kye-ryung, Park Chae-won, Im Kyung-min	Not awarded	Kim Na-young, An Hyun-young	32
2019	Kim Sae-yeon	Lee Ha-nuey, Woo Hee-jun	Lee Hye-joo, Shin Yoon-ah, Lee Da-hyun, Shin Hye-ji	Not awarded	Jang Yu-rim, Lee Jeong-eun, Kwon Ye-ji	32
2020	Kim Hye-jin	Lee Hwa-in, Ryu Seo-bin	Jeon Yeon-ju, Jeon Hye-ji	Not awarded	Jung Yun-ju, Kim Hye-young, Park So-jeong, Choi Jeong-yoon	37
2021	Choi Seo-eun	Choi Mi-na-su, Kim Su-jin	Cho Min-ji, Jung Bo-bin (Jung Do-hee)	Not awarded	Kim Ji-eun, Jang Jin-won	40
2022	Lee Seung-hyeon	Yu Si-eun	Kim Go-eun	Not awarded	Kim So-yoon, Kim Ji-su, Park Joo-eun, Kim Seo-young, Byun Han-na	30
2023	Choi Chae-won	Chung Gyu-ri, Kim Ji-sung	Jo Su-bin, Jang Da-yeon	Not awarded	Kim Jo-hee, Won Jo-hyun, Chu So-im, Yu Eun-seo, Lee Seo-hyun, Choi Min-seo	30
2024	Kim Chae-won	Park Hee-sun	Yoon Ha-young	Lee Jae-won, Park Na-hyeon	Choi Jeong-eun, Park Ye-bin, Kwon hae-ji, Jang Hee-ji, Woo Hae-su, Yu Hyeon-jeong	24
2025	Jung Yeon-woo	~~Kim Bo-geum~~	Yu Eun-seo	Park Ji-yu, Lee Seo-hyun	Lee Gyu-ree, Park Seo-young, An Yeon-seo, Cho Ye-won, Kim Min-hee, Cho Eun-bin, Lee Na-young, Kim Se-eun	24
2026	Woo Seo-yoon	Oh Su-min	Lee Min-sol	Rho Hyang, Lee So-min	Seo Yeo-eun, Jeon Seo-yeon, Jeon Su-wan, Kim Bo-yeon, Choi Yu-ri, Hong Se-jeong, Lee Yeon-seo, Jang Ji-an, Son Hee-jung, Kim Na-hyun, Choi Yu-jin	26

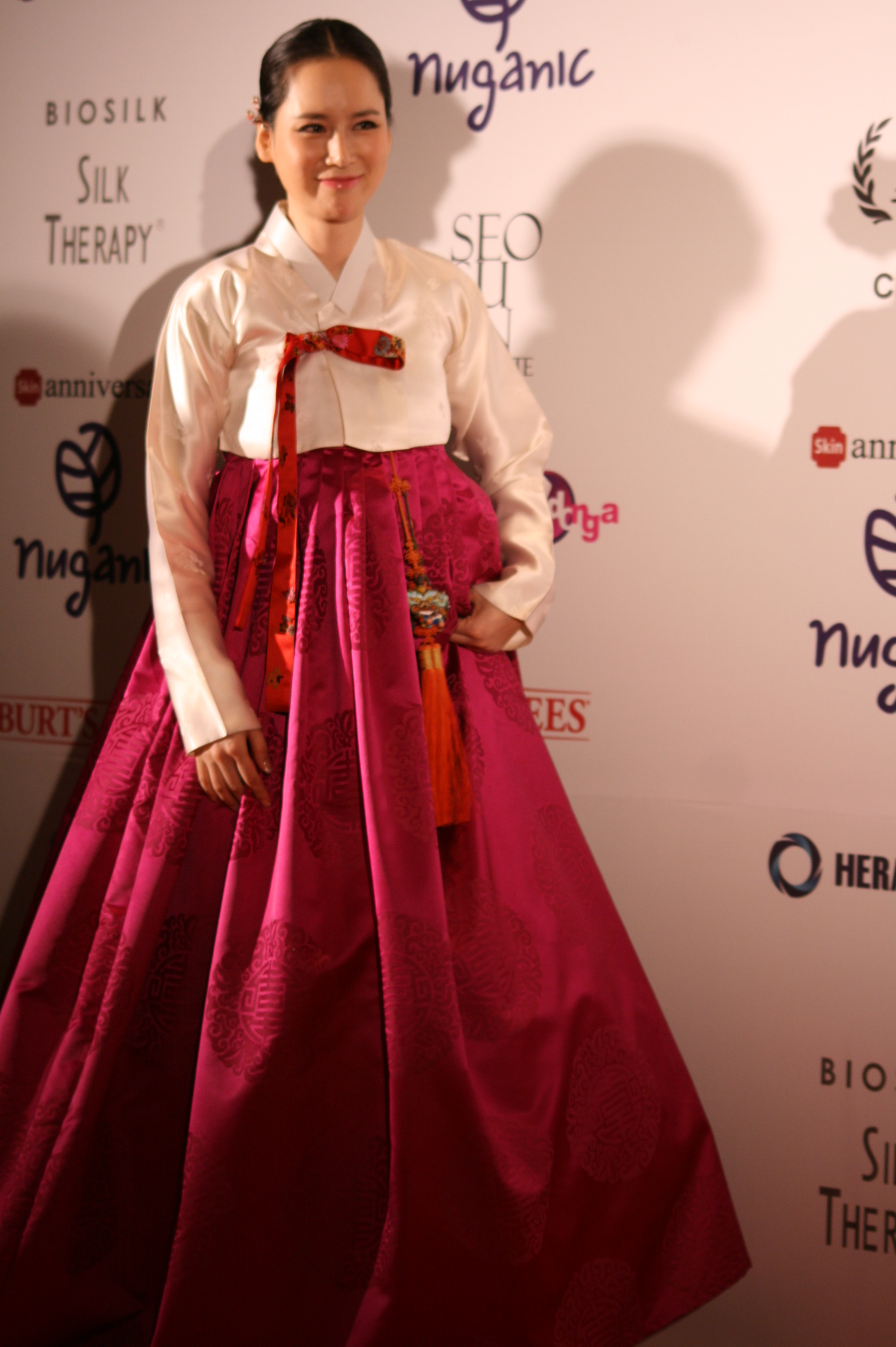
Miss Korea 1999 Fila Lee Hye-won

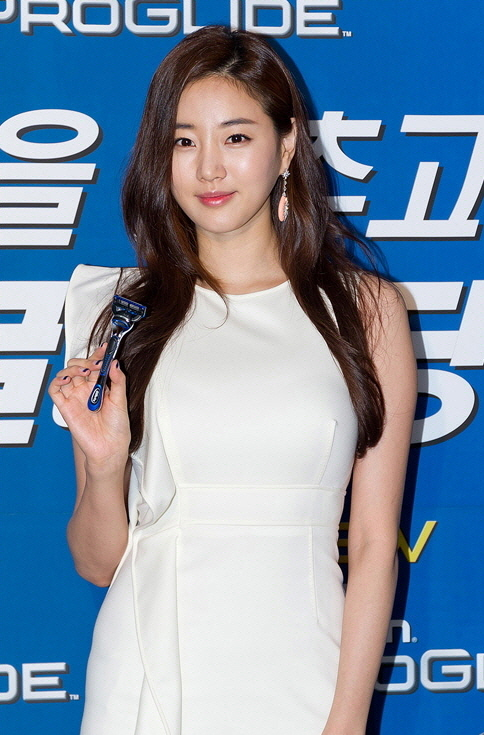
Miss Universe Korea 2001 Kim Sa-rang

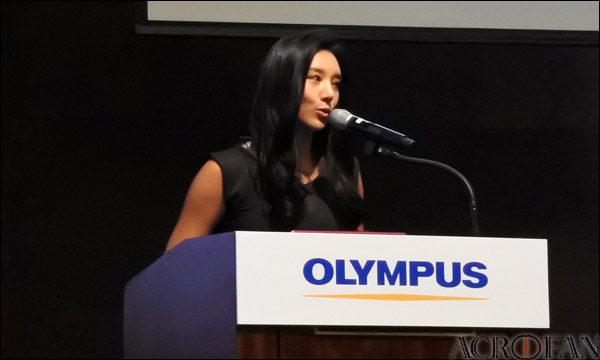
Miss Korea 2001 Muke Jung Ah-reum

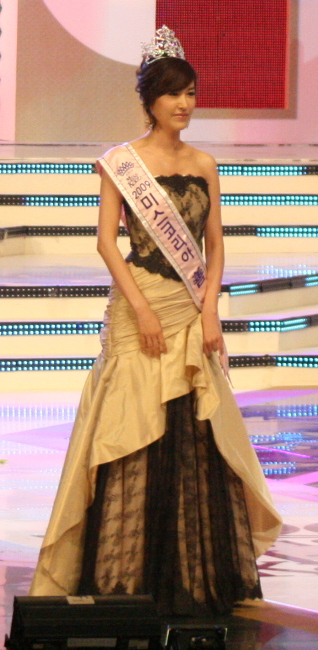
Miss Korea 2009 Seon Cha Ye-rin

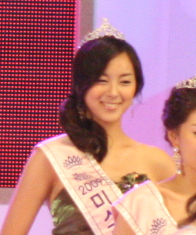
Miss Korea 2009 Mi Lee Seul-ki

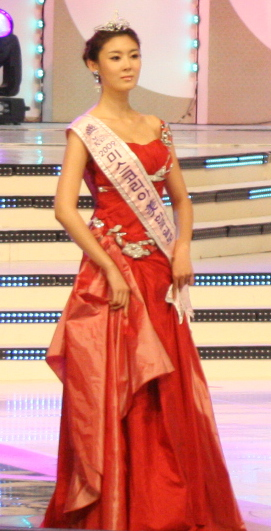
Miss Korea 2009 Mi Choi Ji-hee

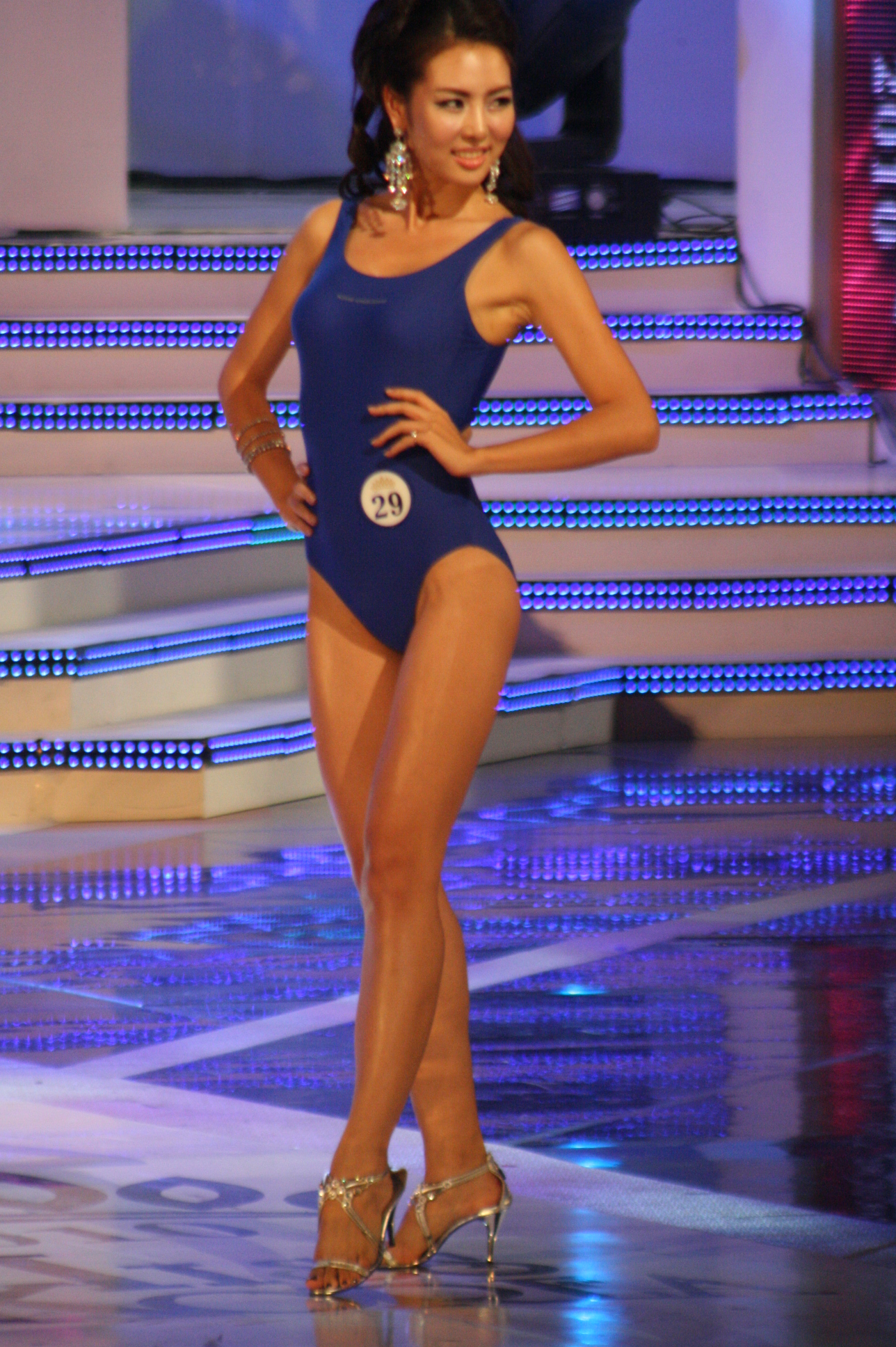
Miss Korea 2010 Seon Jang Yoon-jin

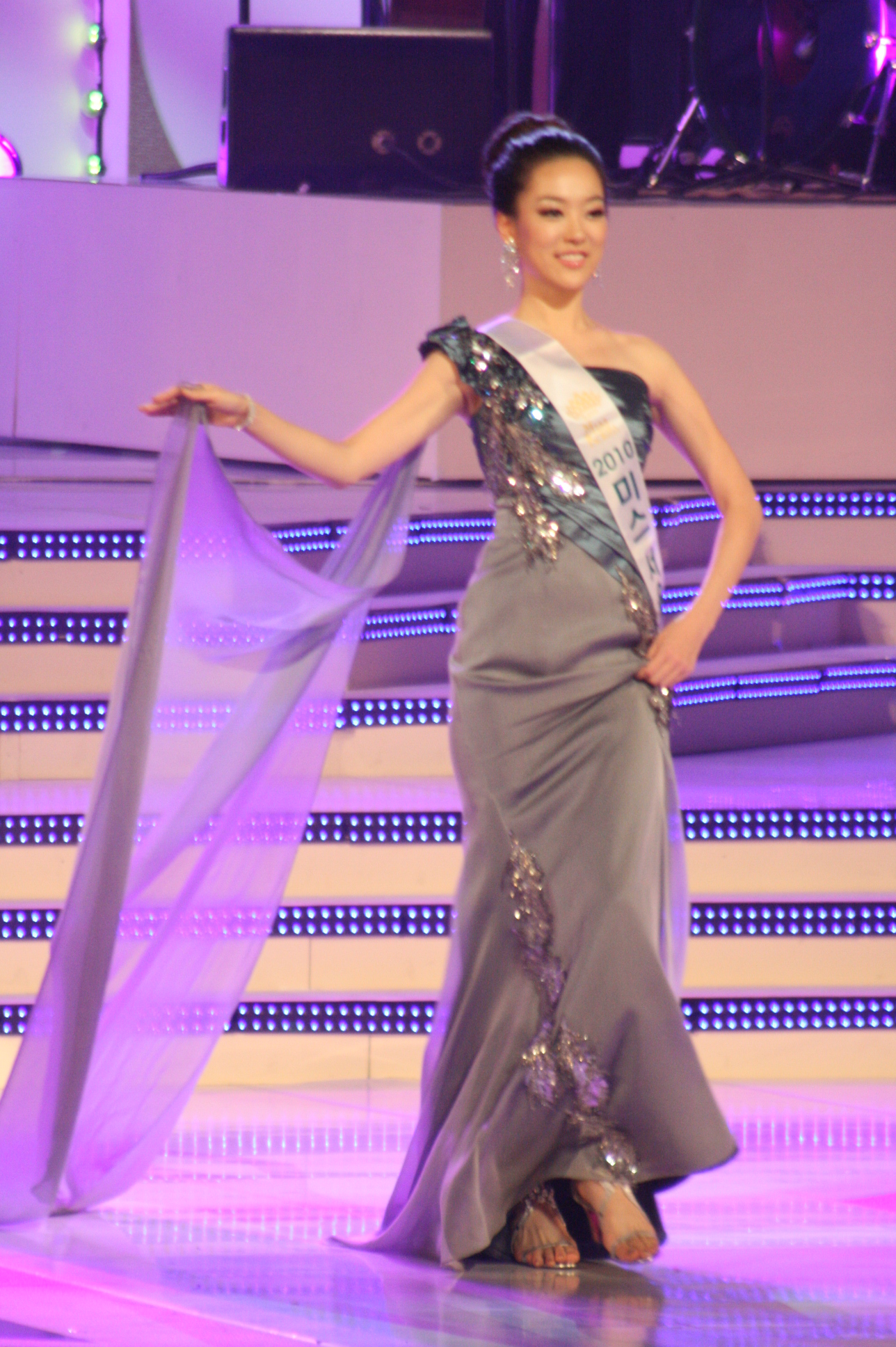
Miss Korea 2010 Mi Ha Hyun-jung

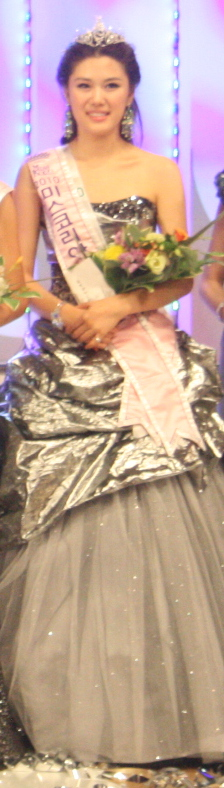
Miss Korea 2010 Mi Ahn Da-hye

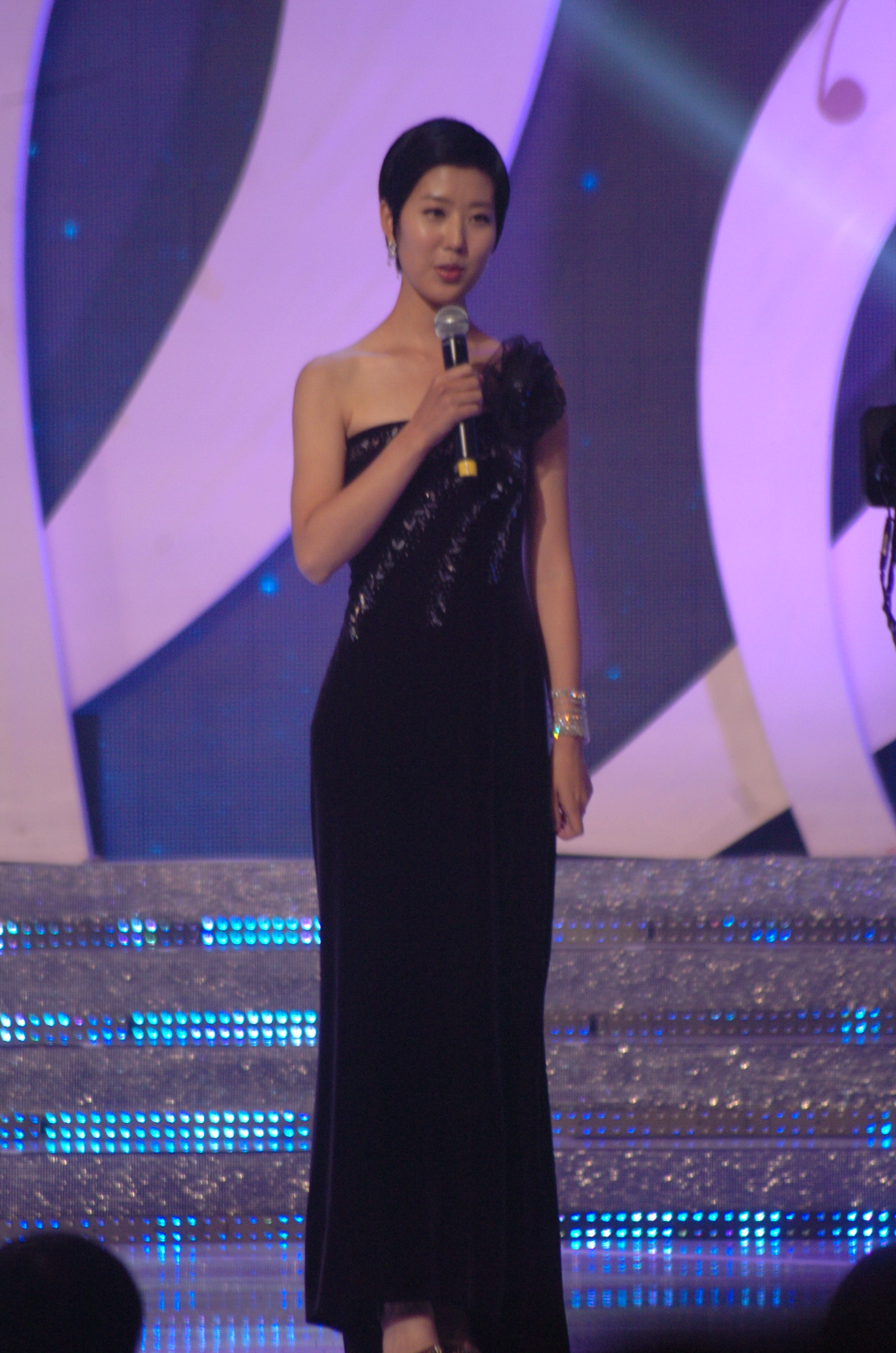
Miss Korea 2011 Mi Lee Semina

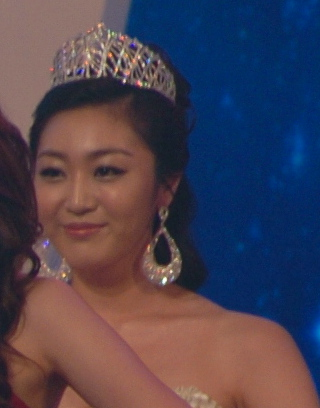
Miss Korea 2011 Mi Nam Mi-yeon

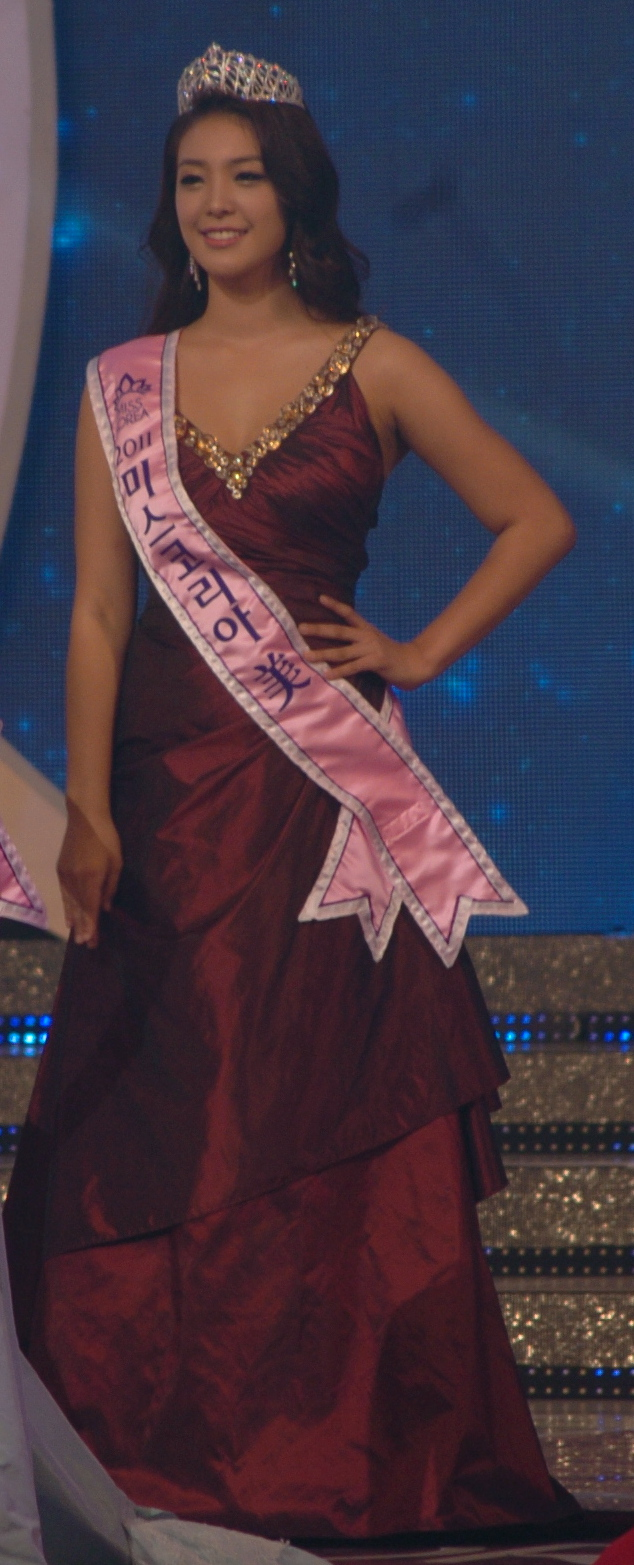
Miss Korea 2011 Mi Kim Soo-jung

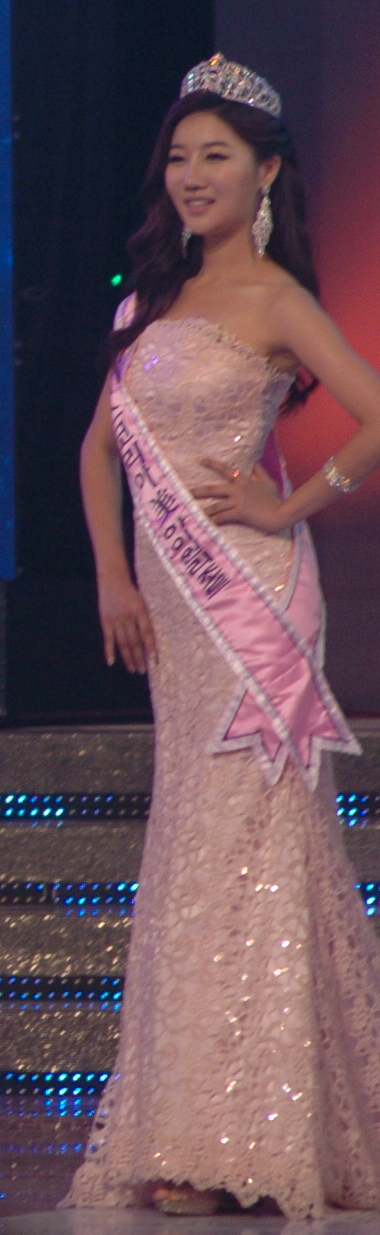
Miss Korea 2011 Mi Gong Pyung-hee

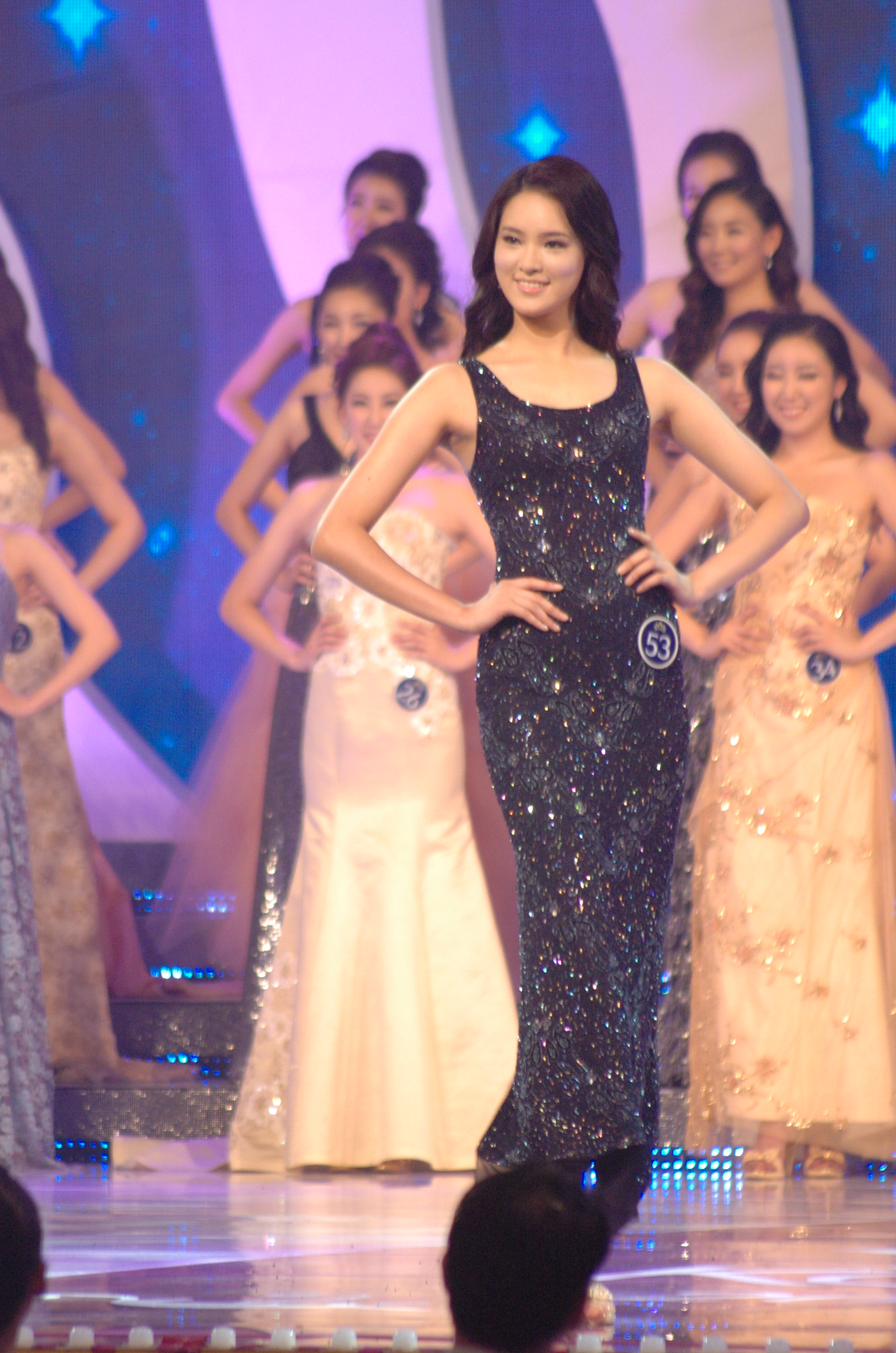
Miss Korea 2012 Mi Kim Young-joo

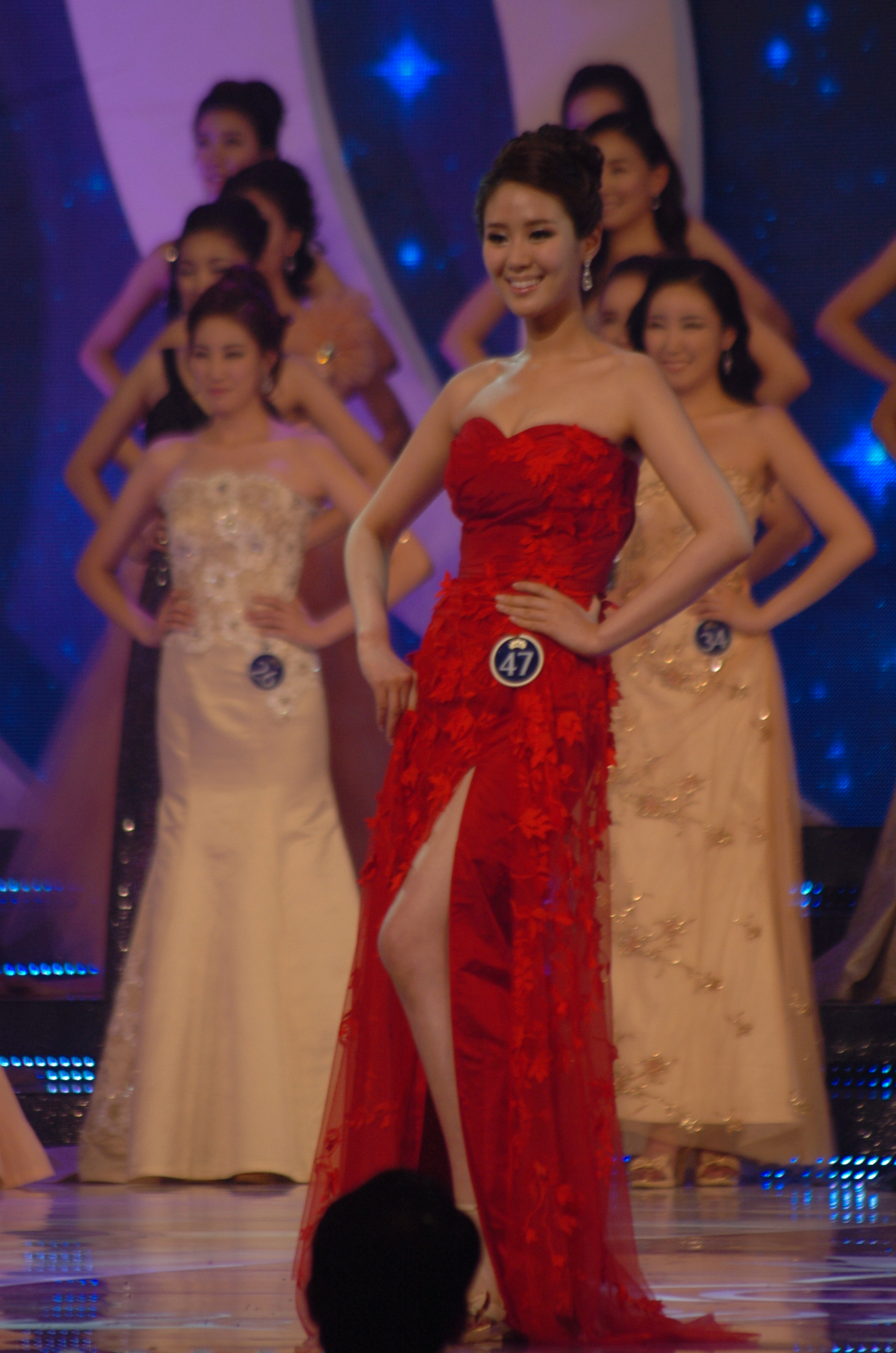
Miss Korea 2012 Mi Kim Na-yeon

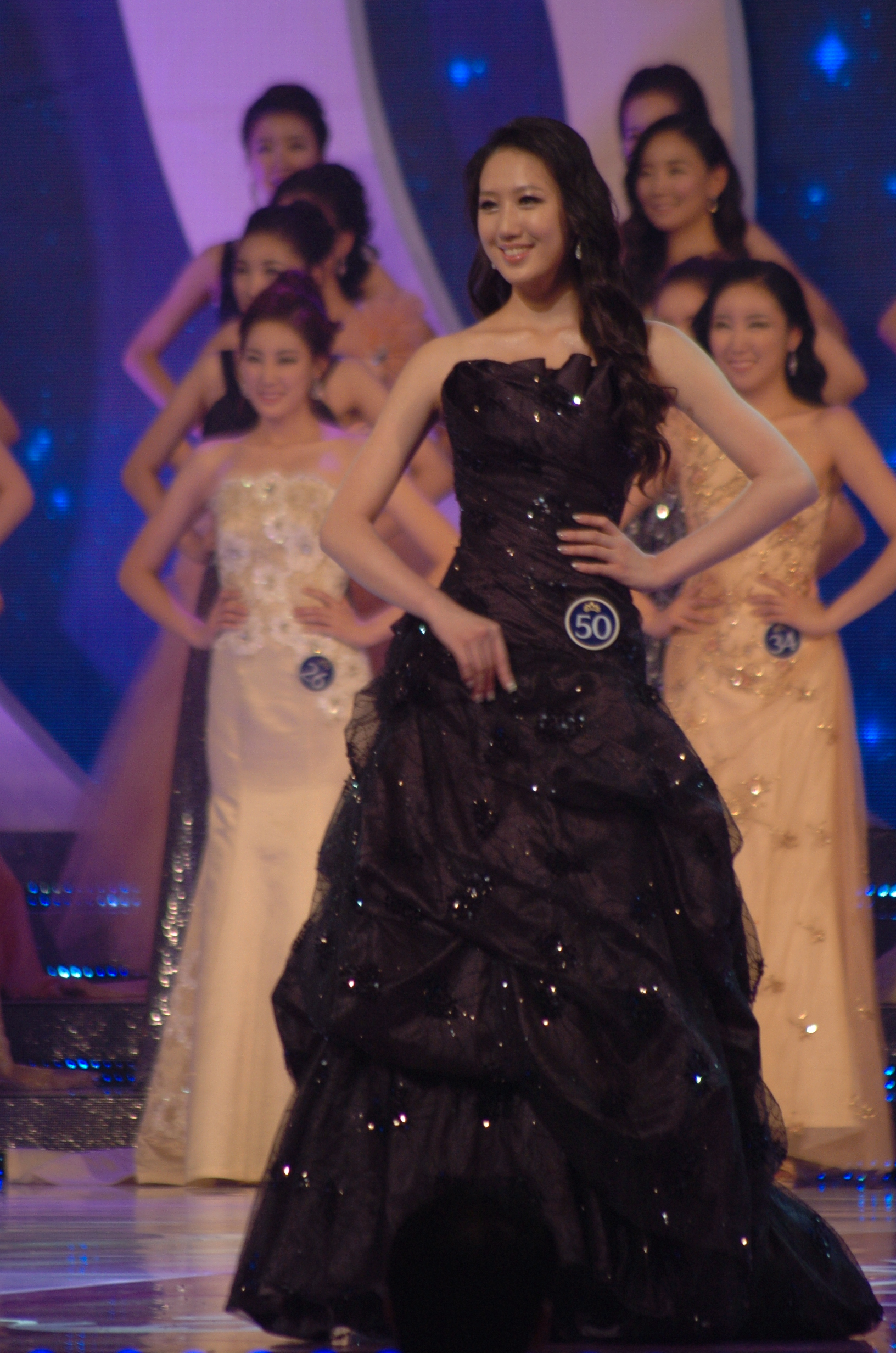
Miss Korea 2012 Mi Kim Tae-hyun

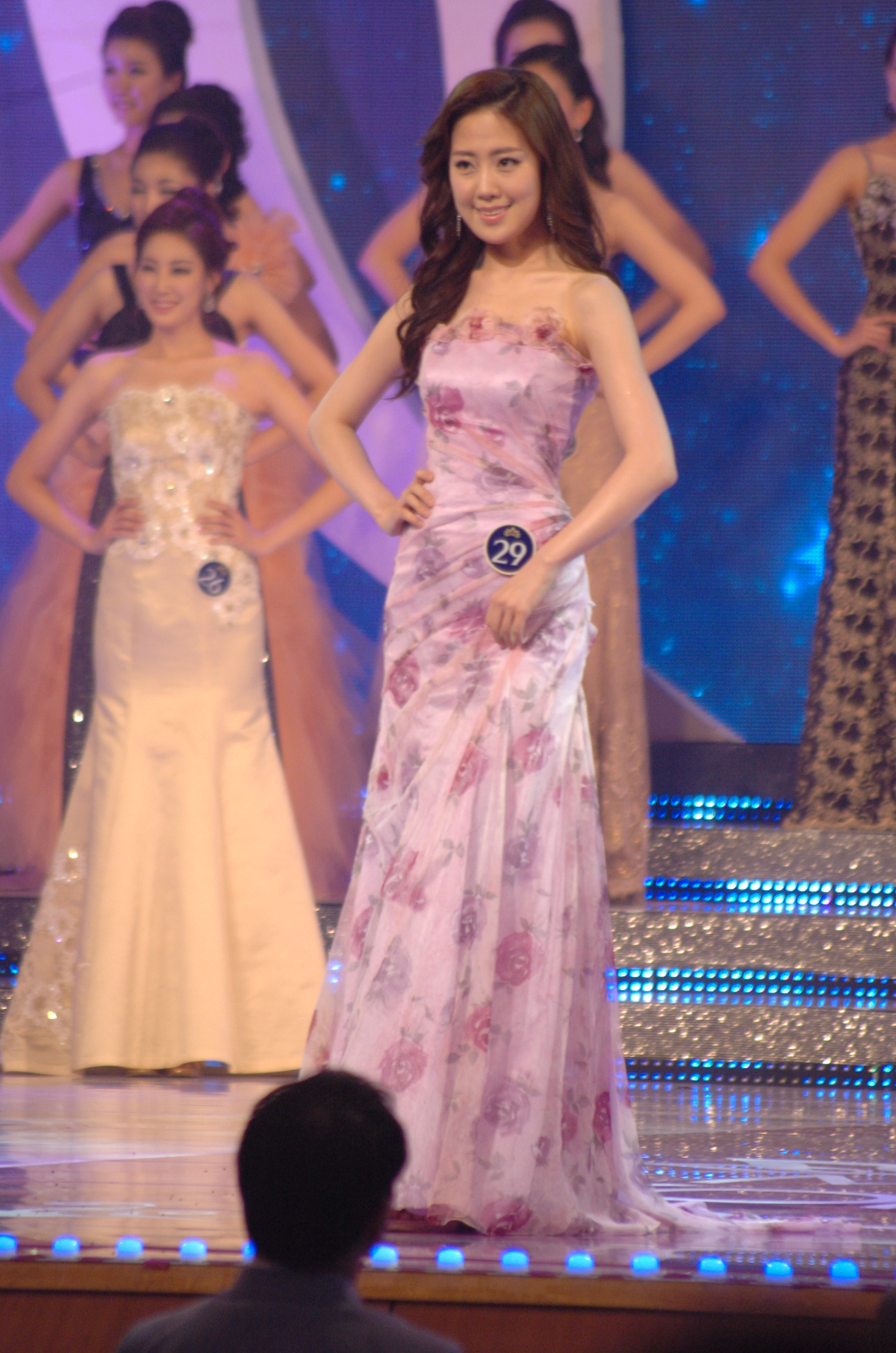
Miss Korea 2012 Mi Kim Yoo-jin

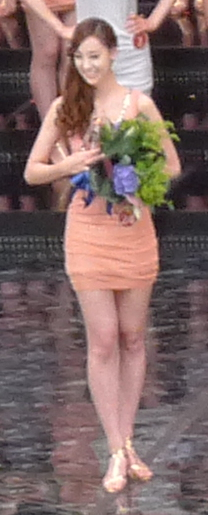
Miss Korea 2013 Seon Kim Hyo-hee

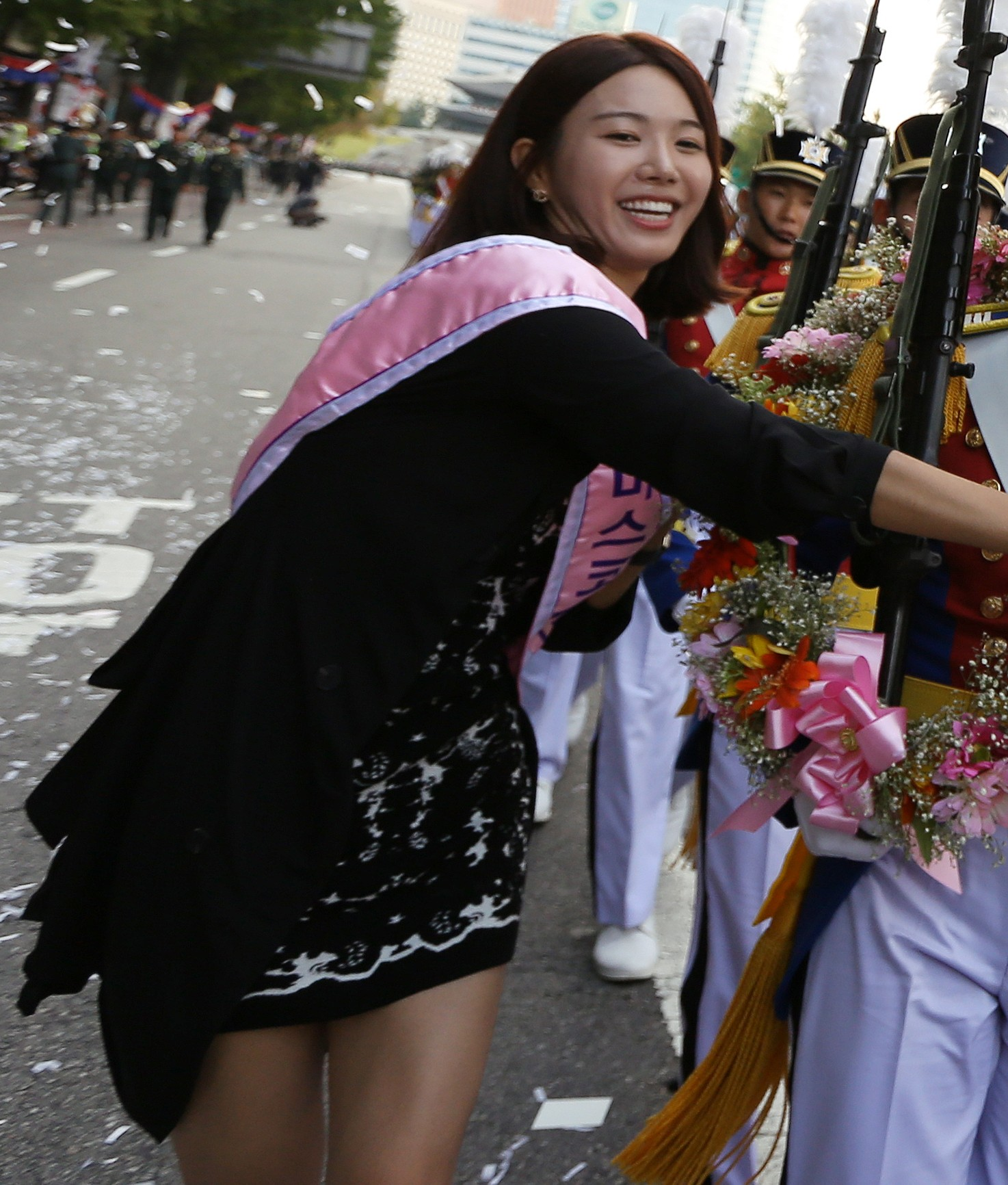
Miss Korea 2013 Mi Koo Bon-hwa

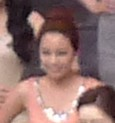
Miss Korea 2013 Mi Choi Hye-rin

Miss Korea 2013 Mi Han Soo-min

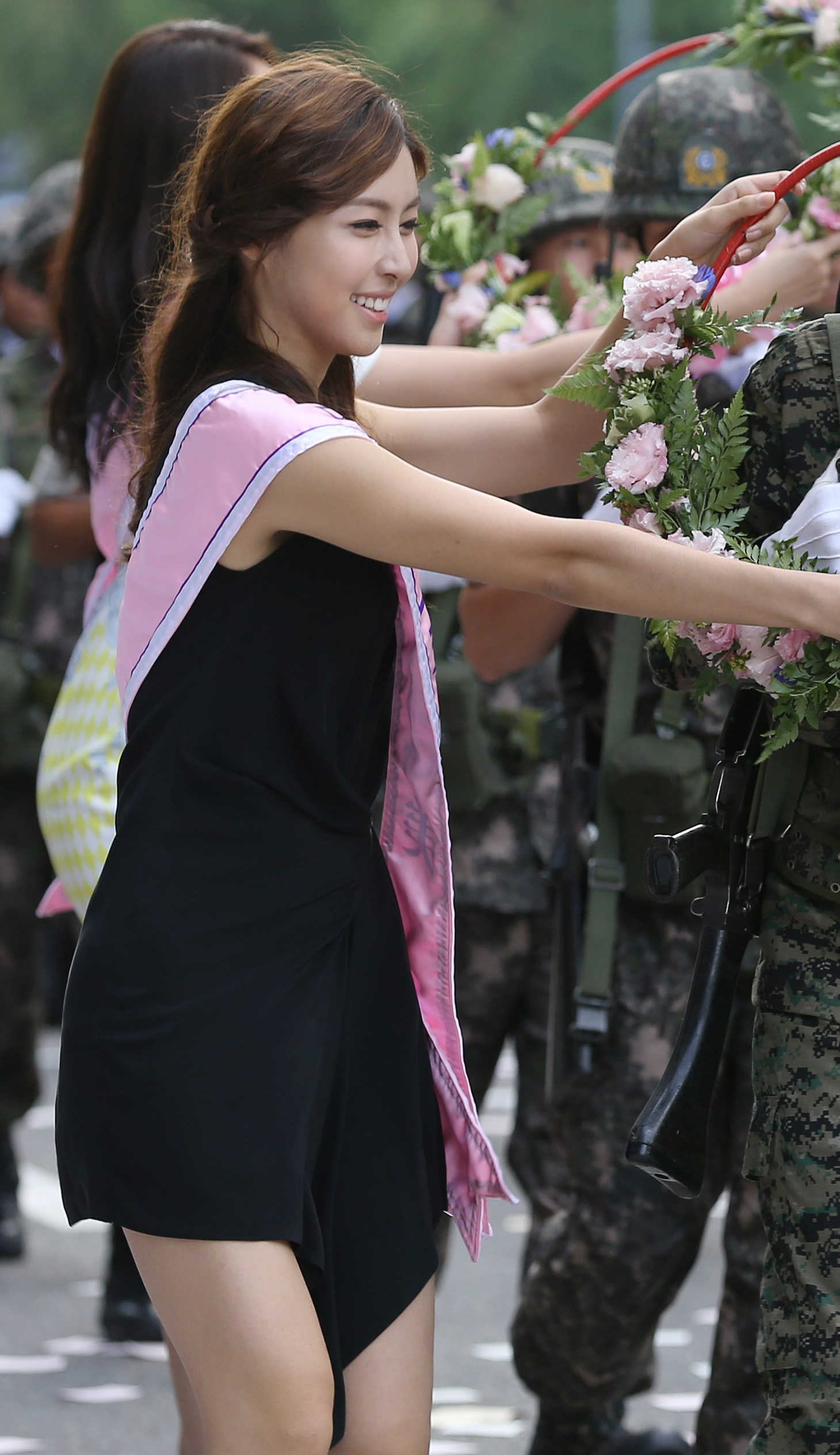
Miss Korea 2013 Mi Kim Min-joo

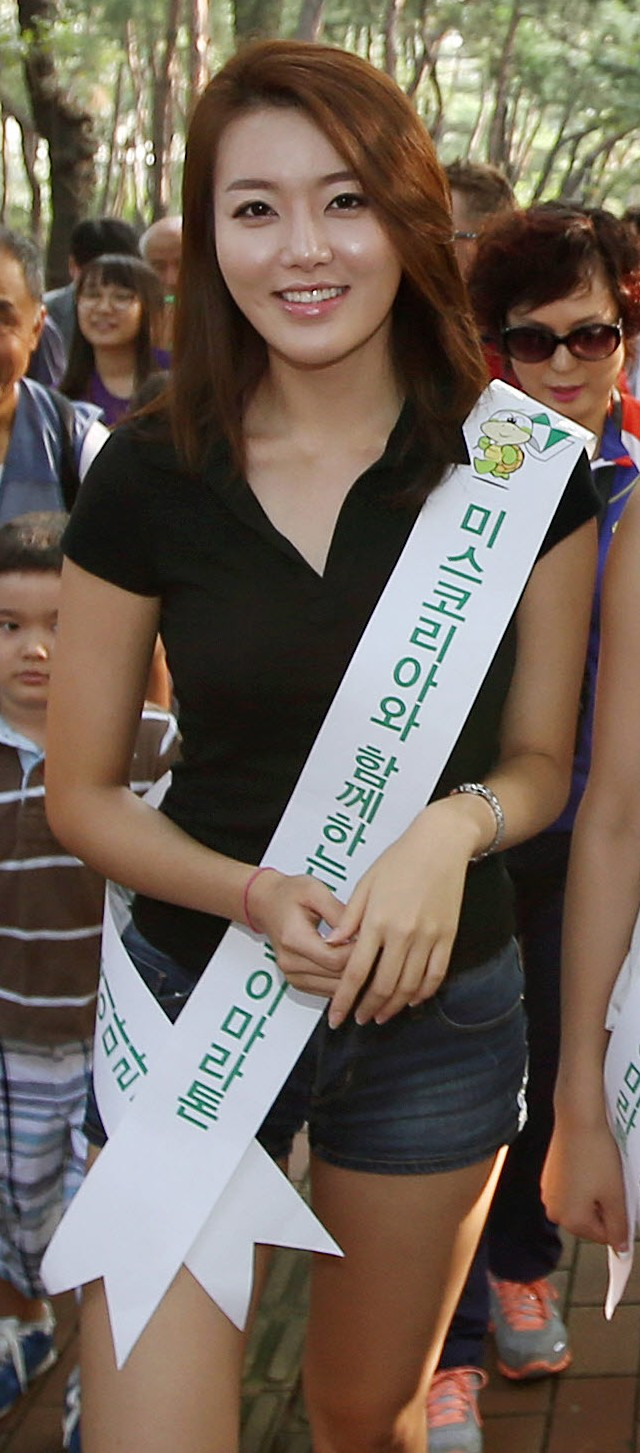
Miss Korea 2014 Mi Ryu So-ra

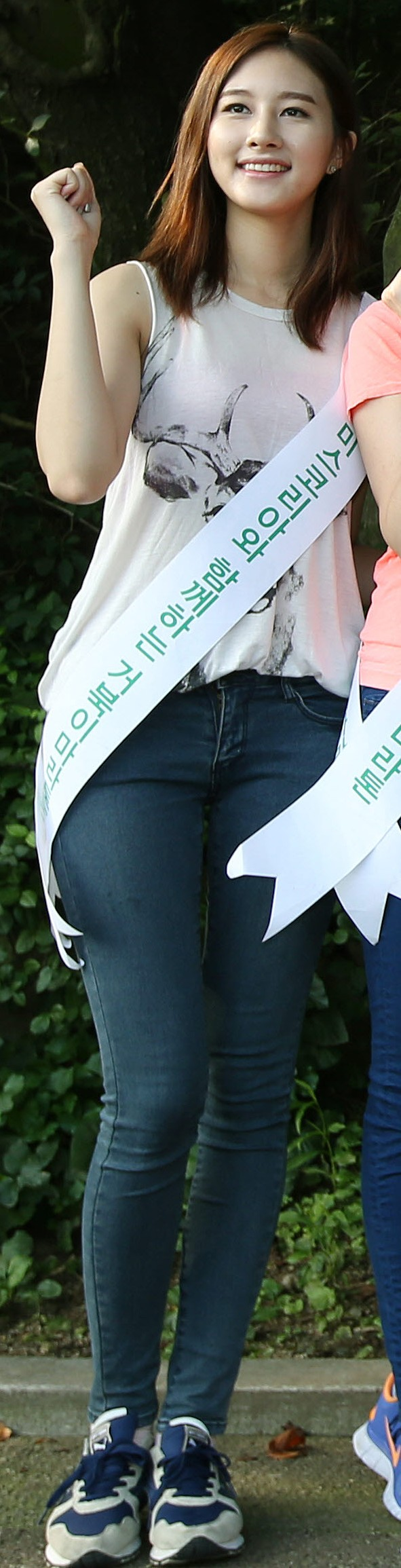
Miss Korea 2014 Mi Kim Myeong-seon

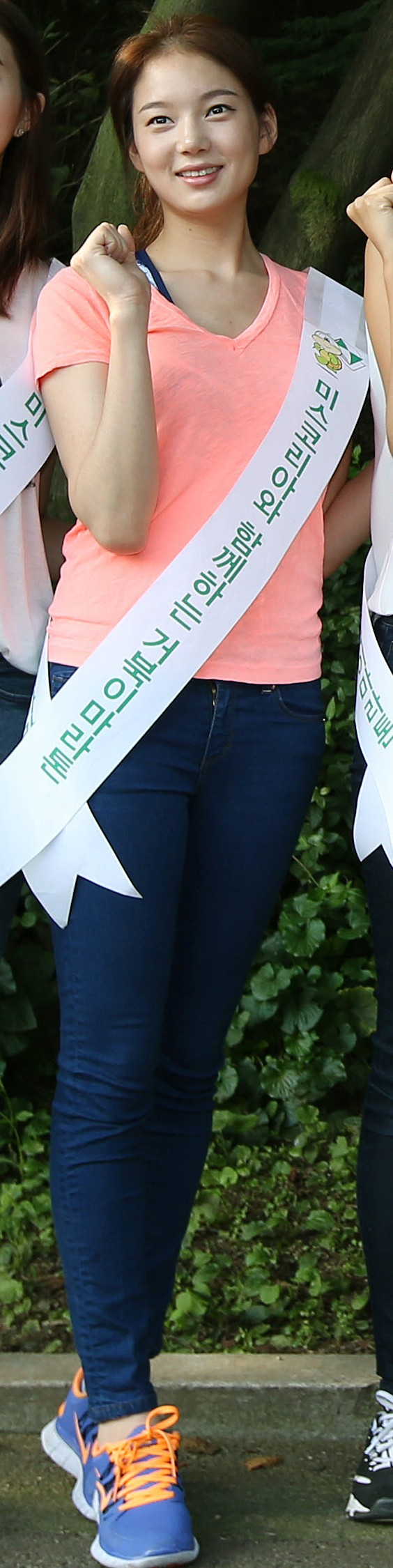
Miss Korea 2014 Mi Lee Sarah

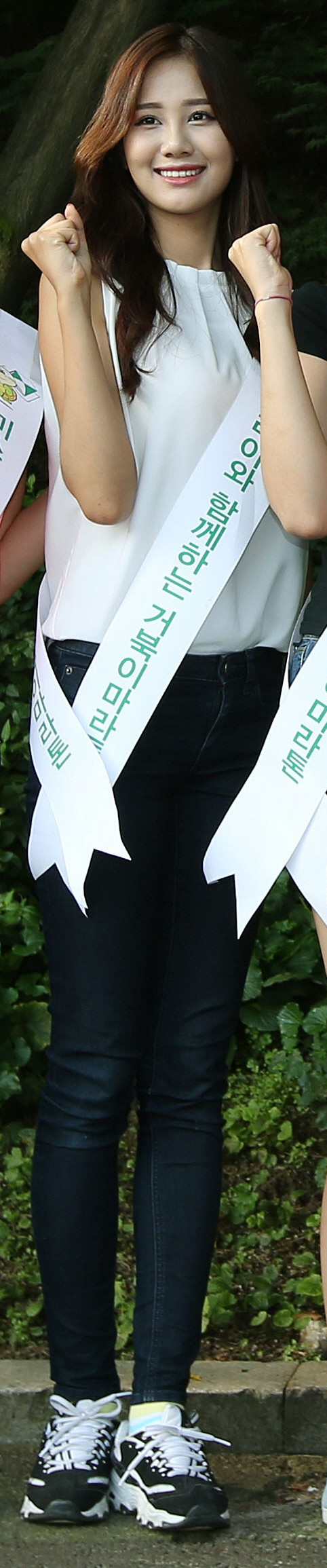
Miss Korea 2014 Mi Baek Ji-hyun

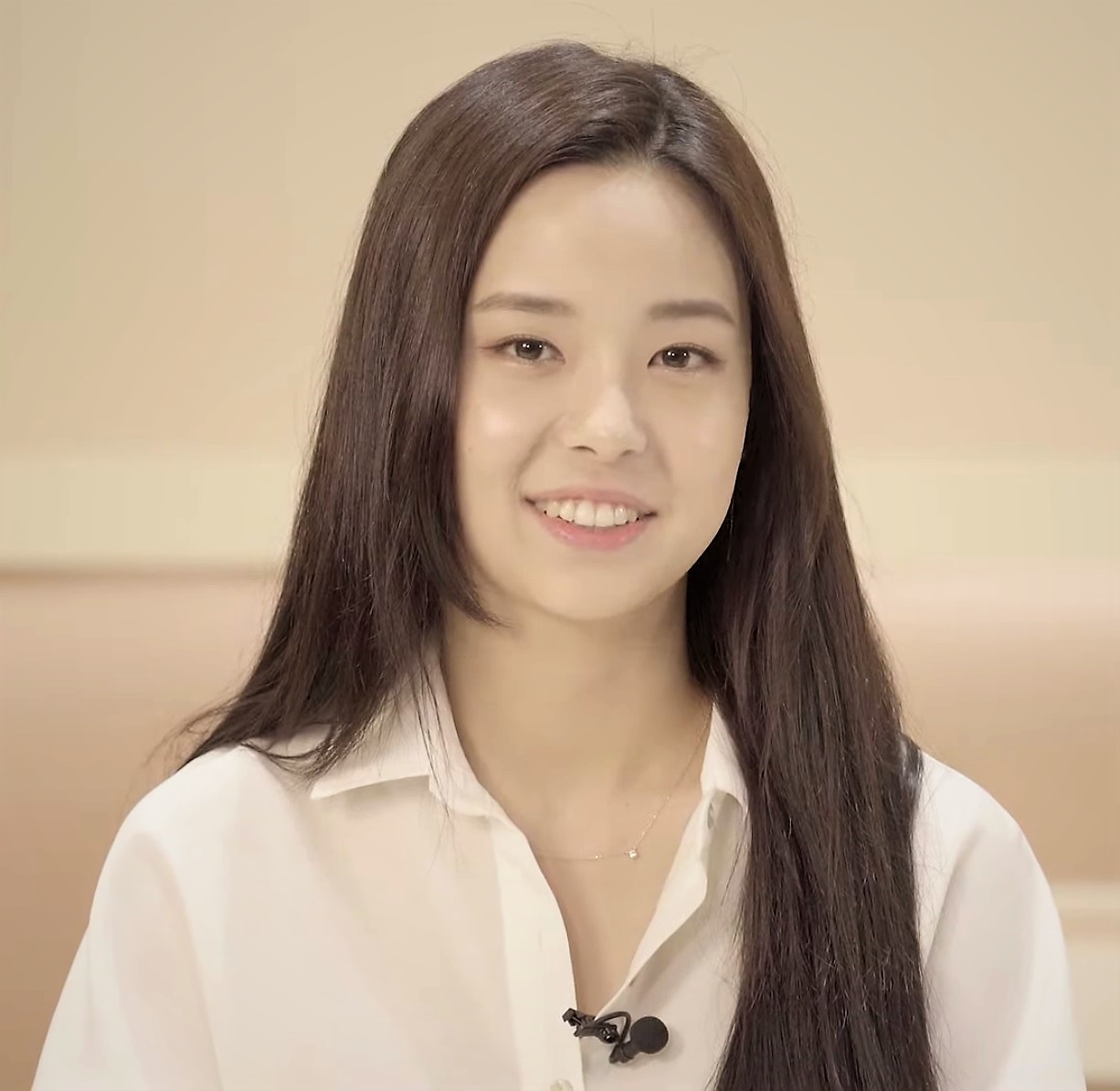
Miss Korea 2019 Kim Sae-yeon

== Former titles ==
Color key

- Declared as Winner
- Ended as runner-up
- Ended as top 5/8 qualification
- Ended as one of the finalists or semifinalists
- Ended as special awards

=== Miss Universe Korea 1954—2015 ===
Korea debuted at Miss Universe in 1954, three years before the first Miss Korea pageant. Since 2016, Korean representatives at Miss Universe have been chosen in a separate pageant, Miss Universe Korea, and the Miss Korea Organization no longer sends South Korea's representative to Miss Universe.

Miss Korea
Year	Residence	Representative	Korean Name	National Title	Placement at MU	Special Awards
1953	Seoul	Kang Gui-hee	강귀희	Joongang ilbo Miss Korea 1953	Did not compete	
1954	Seoul	Kye Sun-hee	계선희	Joongang ilbo Miss Korea 1954	Unplaced	
1955	Seoul	Kim Mee-chong	김미정	Joongang ilbo Miss Korea 1955	Unplaced	
1956	Did not compete in 1956					
1957	Seoul	Park Hyun-ok	박현옥	Miss Korea 1957	Unplaced	
1958	Seoul	Oh Geum-sun	오금순	Miss Korea 1958	Unplaced	
1959	Seoul	Oh Hyun-ju	오현주	Miss Korea 1959	Top 15 (6th Place)	5 Special Awards: Most popular girl; Speech Award; Sportsmanship Award; Honorable Mention Award; Best Dress Award (LA Designers Association)
1960	Seoul	Son Mi-hee-ja	손미희자	Miss Korea 1960	Top 15	
1961	Seoul	Seo Yang-hee	서양희	Miss Korea 1961	Top 15	
1962	Seoul	Seo Bum-ju	서범주	Miss Korea 1962	Top 15	1 Special Awards: Best National Costume (Top 5)
1963	Seoul	Kim Myoung-ja	김명자	Miss Korea 1963	4th Runner-up	
1964	Seoul	Shin Jung-hyun	신정현	Miss Korea 1964	Unplaced	
1965	Gyeongbuk	Kim Eun-ji	김은지	Miss Korea 1965	Unplaced	
1966	Gyeongbuk	Yoon Gwi-young	윤귀영	Miss Korea 1966	Unplaced	
1967	Seoul	Hong Joung-ae	홍정애	Miss Korea 1967	Unplaced	
1968	Seoul	Kim Yoon-jung	김윤정	Miss Korea 1968	Unplaced	
1969	Seoul	Lim Hyun-jung	임현정	Miss Korea 1969	Unplaced	
1970	Seoul	Yoo Young-ae	유영애	Miss Korea 1970	Unplaced	
1971	Busan	Noh Mi-ae	노미애	Miss Korea 1971	Unplaced	
1972	Seoul	Park Yeon-joo	박연주	Miss Korea 1972	Unplaced	
1973	Seoul	Kim Young-ju	김영주	Miss Korea 1973	Unplaced	
1974	Seoul	Kim Eun-jung	김은정	Miss Korea 1974	Unplaced	1 Special Awards: Best National Costume
1975	Gyeongbuk	Seo Ji-hye	서지혜	Miss Korea 1975	Unplaced	
1976	Seoul	Chung Kwang-hyun	정광현	1st Runner-up of 1976	Unplaced	
1976	Seoul	Chung Kyoung-sook	정경숙	Miss Korea 1976	Did not compete	
1977	Seoul	Kim Sung-hee	김성희	Miss Korea 1977	Unplaced	1 Special Awards: Best National Costume
1978	Seoul	Son Jung-eun	손정은	Miss Korea 1978	Unplaced	1 Special Awards: Best National Costume (1st Runner-up)
1979	Seoul	Seo Jae-hwa	서재화	Miss Korea 1979	Unplaced	
1980	Seoul	Kim Eun-jung	김은정	Miss Korea 1980	Top 12	
1981	Seoul	Lee Eun-jung	이은정	Miss Korea 1981	Unplaced	1 Special Awards: Best National Costume (2nd Runner-up)
1982	Seoul	Park Sun-hee	박선희	Miss Korea 1982	Unplaced	
1983	Seoul	Kim Jong-jung	김종중	3rd Runner-up of 1983	Unplaced	1 Special Awards: Best National Costume
1984	Seoul	Lim Mi-sook	임미숙	Miss Korea 1983	Unplaced	
1985	Seoul	Choi Young-ok	최영옥	Miss Korea 1984	Unplaced	
1986	Jeonbuk	Bae Young-ran	배영란	Miss Korea 1985	Unplaced	
1987	Seoul	Kim Ji-eun	김지은	Miss Korea 1986	Unplaced	
1988	Daegu	Jang Yoon-jeong	장윤정	Miss Korea 1987	1st Runner-up	
1989	Seoul	Kim Sung-ryung	김성령	Miss Korea 1988	Unplaced	
1990	Seoul	Oh Hyun-kyung	오현경	Miss Korea 1989	Unplaced	
1991	Seoul	Seo Jung-min	서정민	Miss Korea 1990	Unplaced	
1992	Seoul	Lee Young-hyun	이영현	Miss Korea 1991	Unplaced	
1993	Seoul	Yoo Ha-young	유하영	Miss Korea 1992	Unplaced	
1994	Seoul	Goong Sun-young	궁선영	Miss Korea 1993	Unplaced	1 Special Awards: Special Diplomas
1995	Seoul	Han Sung-ju	한성주	Miss Korea 1994	Unplaced	
1996	Seoul	Kim Yun-jung	김윤정	Miss Korea 1995	Unplaced	
1997	Seoul	Lee Eun-hee	이은희	Miss Korea 1996	Unplaced	
1998	Seoul	Kim Ji-yeon	김지연	Miss Korea 1997	Unplaced	
1999	Seoul	Choi Ji-hyun	최지현	Miss Korea 1998	Unplaced	
2000	Daejeon	Kim Yeon-ju	김연주	Miss Korea 1999	Unplaced	
2001	Seoul	Kim Sa-rang	김사랑	Miss Korea 2000	Unplaced	1 Special Awards: Best National Costume
2002	Seoul	Kim Min-kyoung	김민경	Miss Korea 2001	Unplaced	
2003	Gyeongbuk	Keum Na-na	금나나	Miss Korea 2002	Unplaced	
2004	Seoul	Choi Yun-young	최윤영	Miss Korea 2003	Unplaced	
2005	Seoul	Kim So-young	김소영	Miss Korea 2004	Unplaced	
2006	Seoul	Kim Joo-hee	김주희	Miss Korea 2005	Unplaced	
2007	Seoul	Lee Ha-nui	이하늬	Miss Korea 2006	3rd Runner-up	
2008	Seoul	Lee Ji-seon	이지선	Miss Korea 2007	Unplaced	
2009	Seoul	Na Ry	나리	Miss Korea 2008	Unplaced	
2010	Seoul	Kim Joo-ri	김주리	Miss Korea 2009	Unplaced	
2011	Seoul	Chong So-ra	정소라	Miss Korea 2010	Unplaced	
2012	Seoul	Lee Sung-hye	이성혜	Miss Korea 2011	Unplaced	
2013	Seoul	Kim Yu-mi	김유미	Miss Korea 2012	Unplaced	
2014	Daegu	Yoo Ye-bin	유예빈	Miss Korea 2013	Unplaced	
2015	Seoul	Kim Seo-yeon	김서연	Miss Korea 2014	Unplaced	
2016	Gyeonggi	Lee Min-ji	이민지	Miss Korea 2015	Unable to compete	
List of Miss Universe Participant from 2016–present

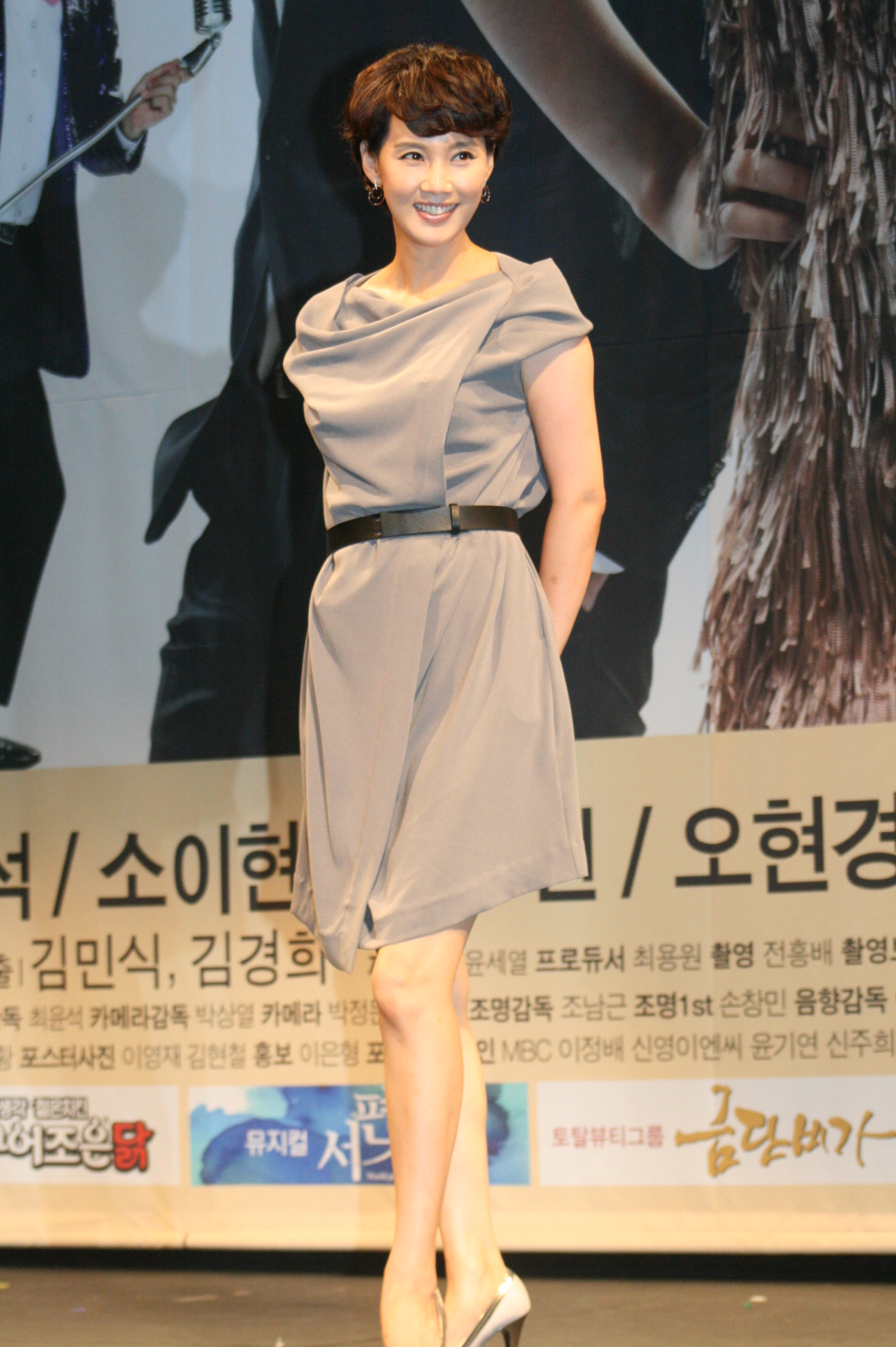
Miss Universe Korea 1990 Oh Hyun-kyung

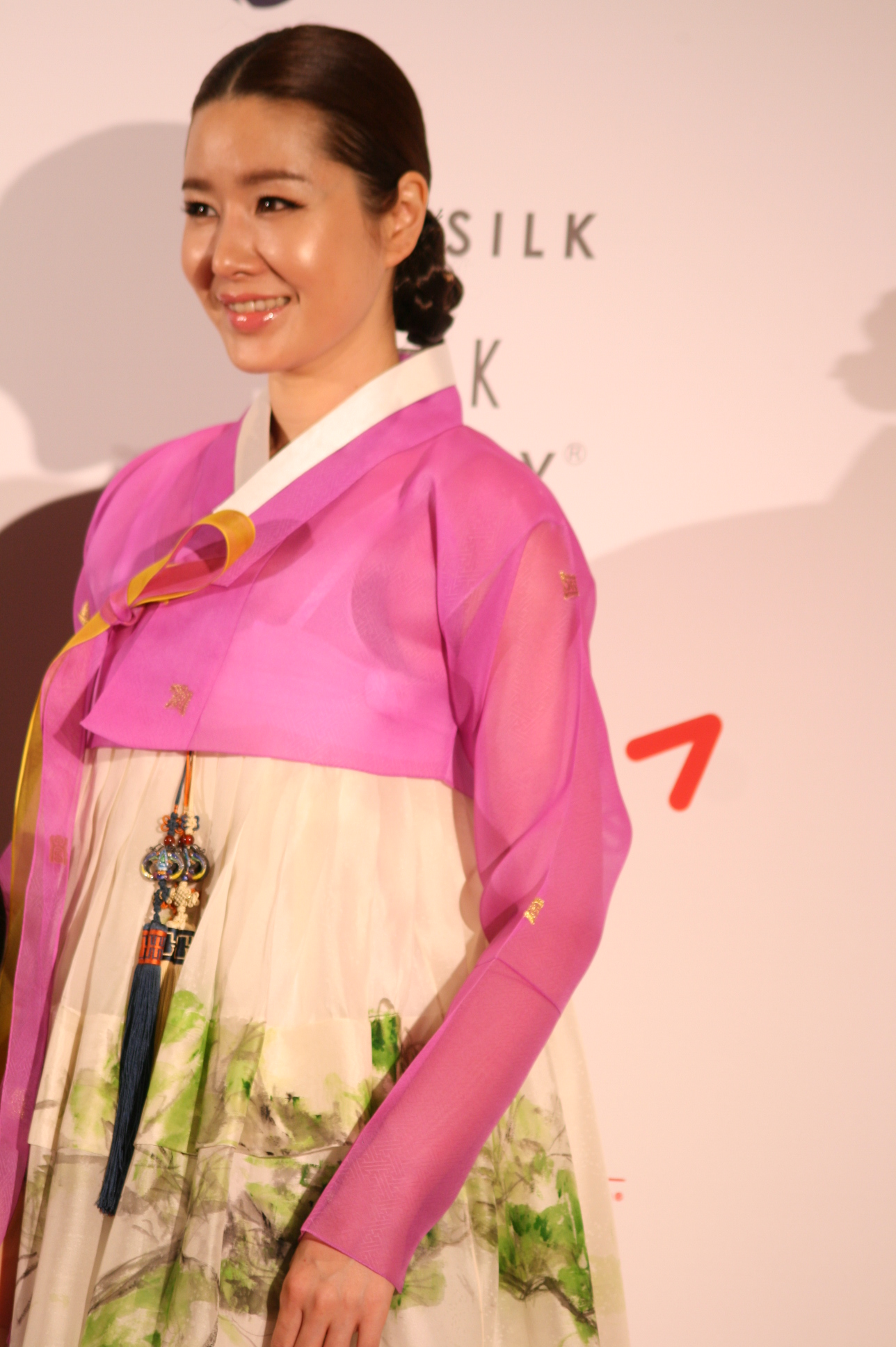
Miss Universe Korea 1998 Kim Ji-yeon

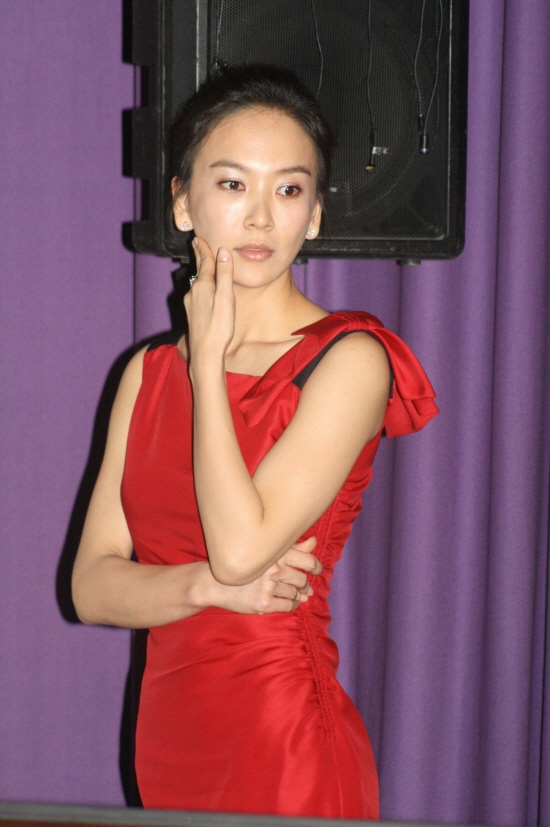
Miss Universe Korea 1999 Choi Ji-hyun

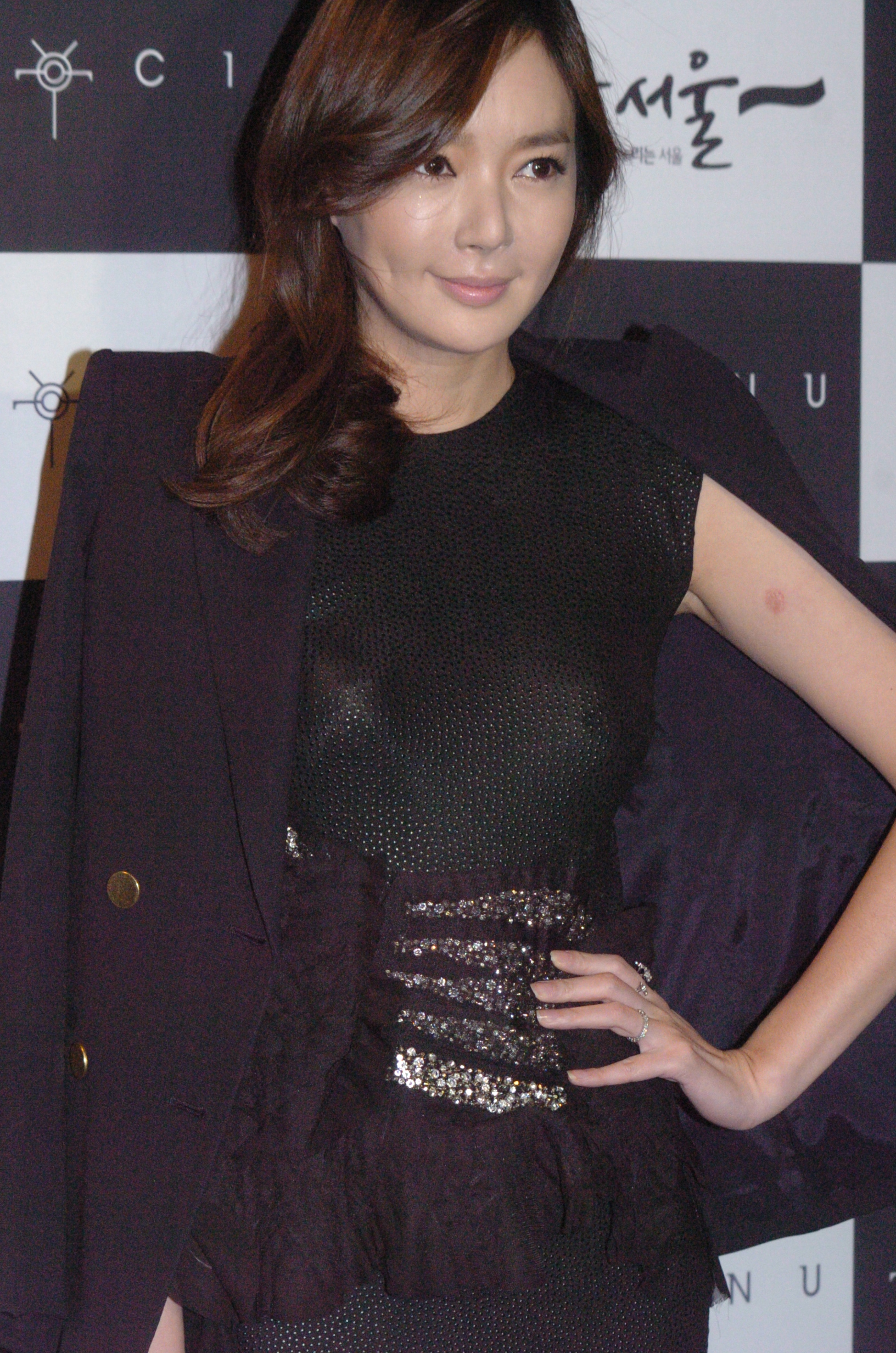
Miss Universe Korea 2000 Kim Yeon-joo

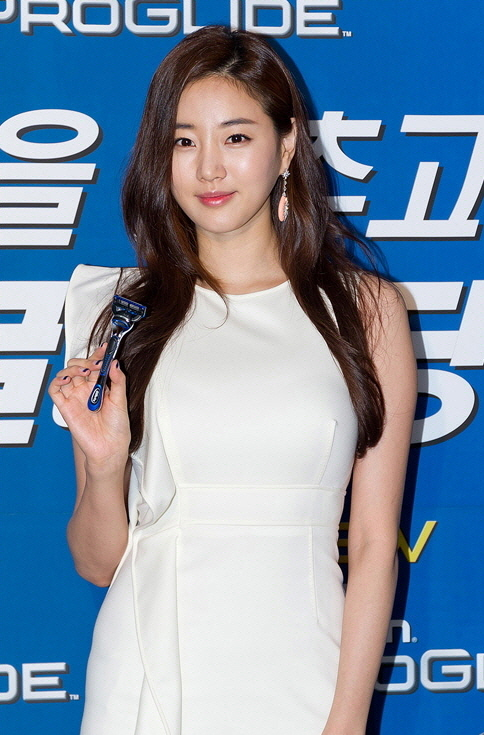
Miss Universe Korea 2001 Kim Sa-rang

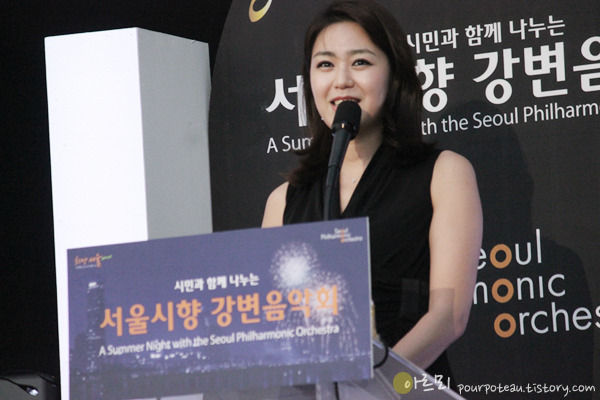
Miss Universe Korea 2006 Kim Joo-hee

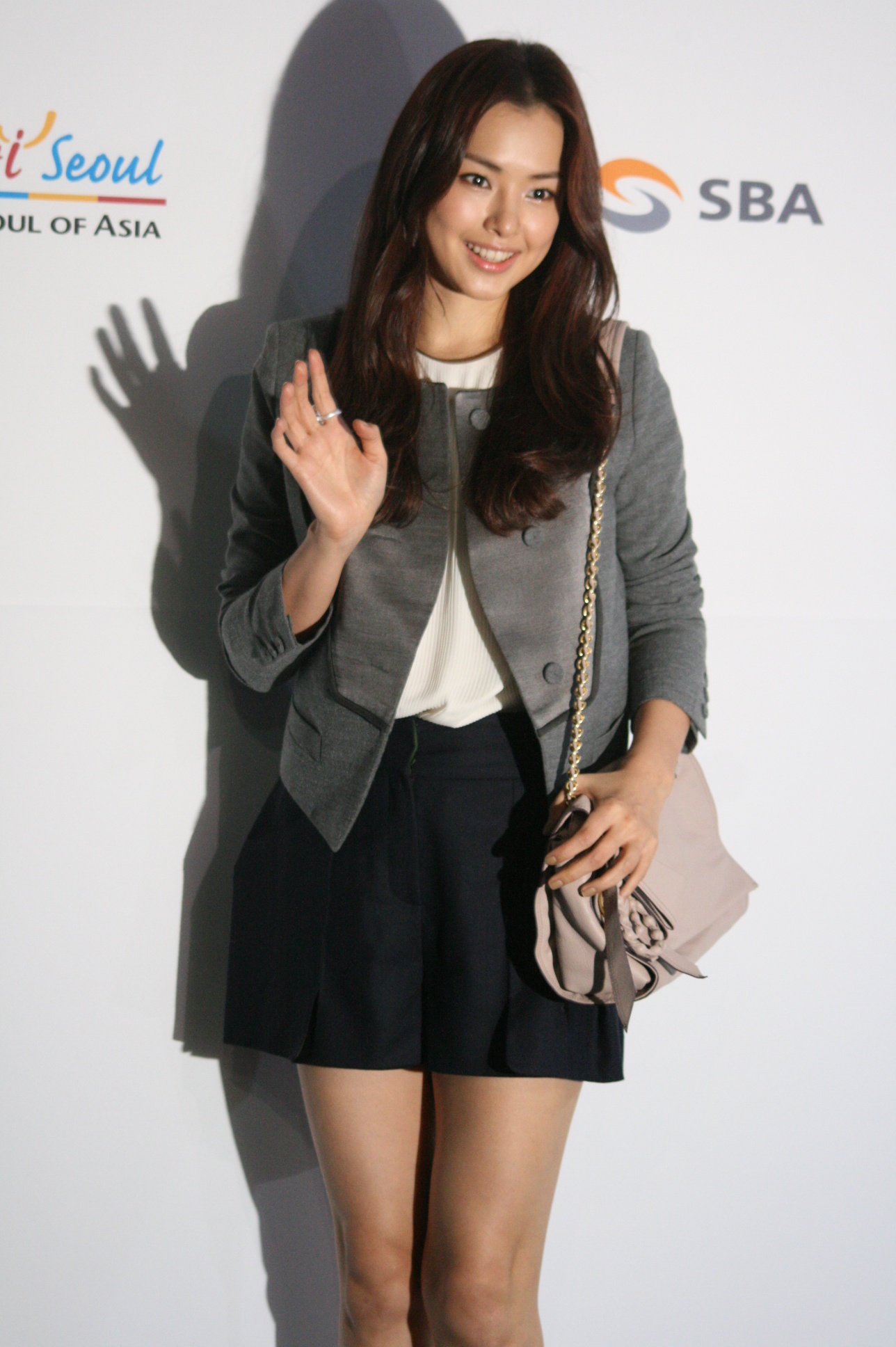
Miss Universe Korea 2007 Lee Ha-nui

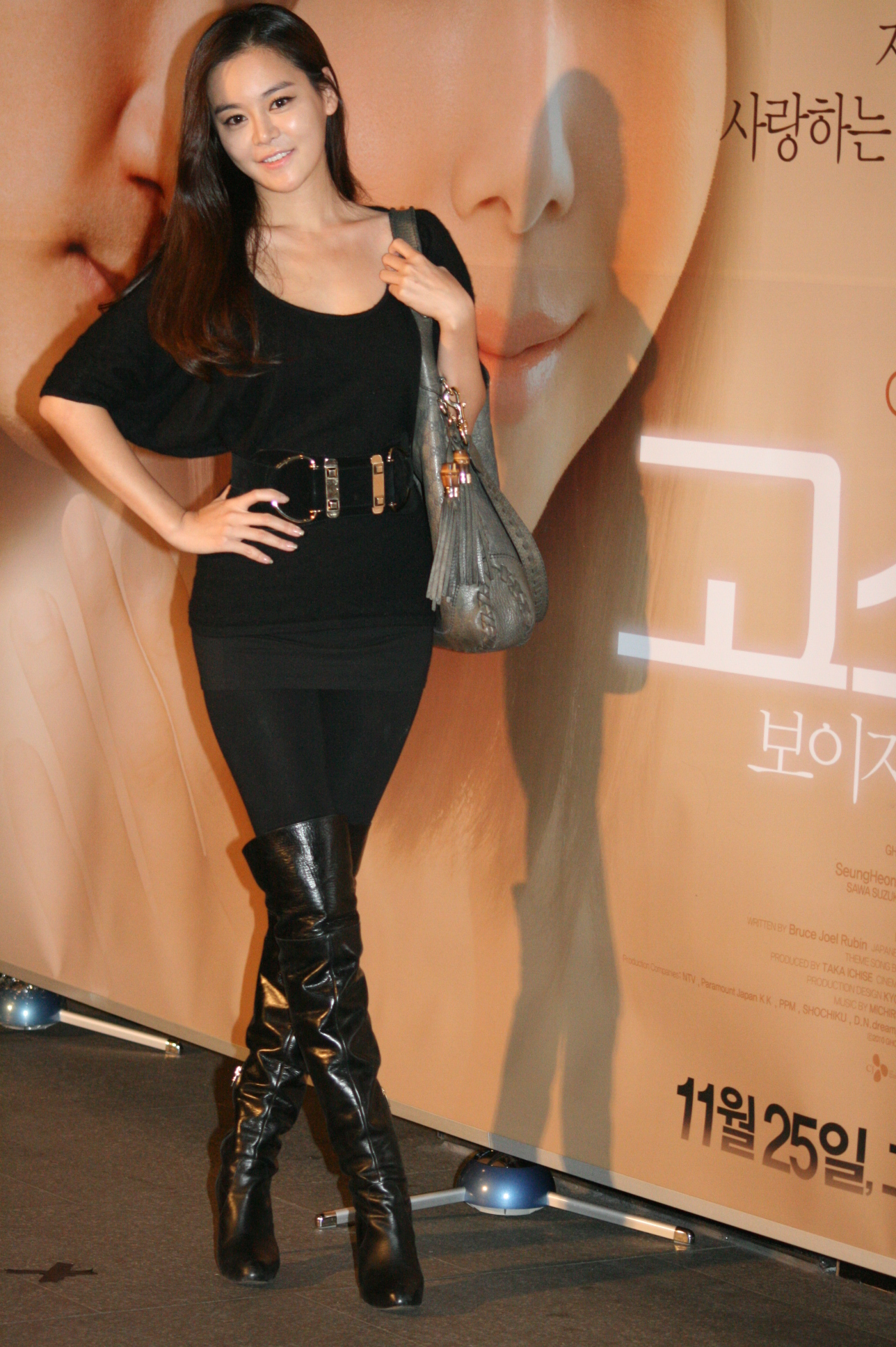
Miss Universe Korea 2008 Lee Ji-seon

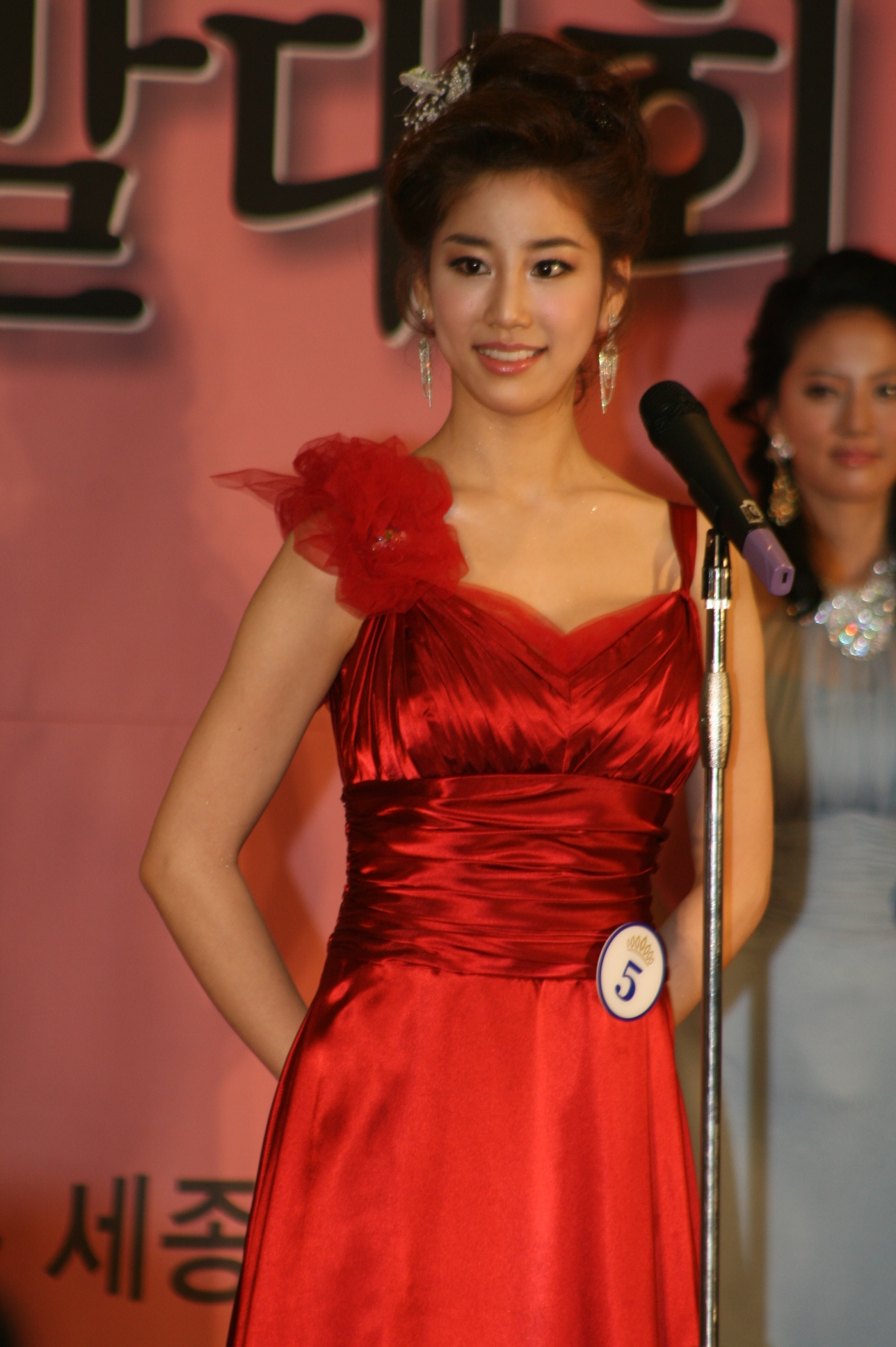
Miss Universe Korea 2010 Kim Joo-ri

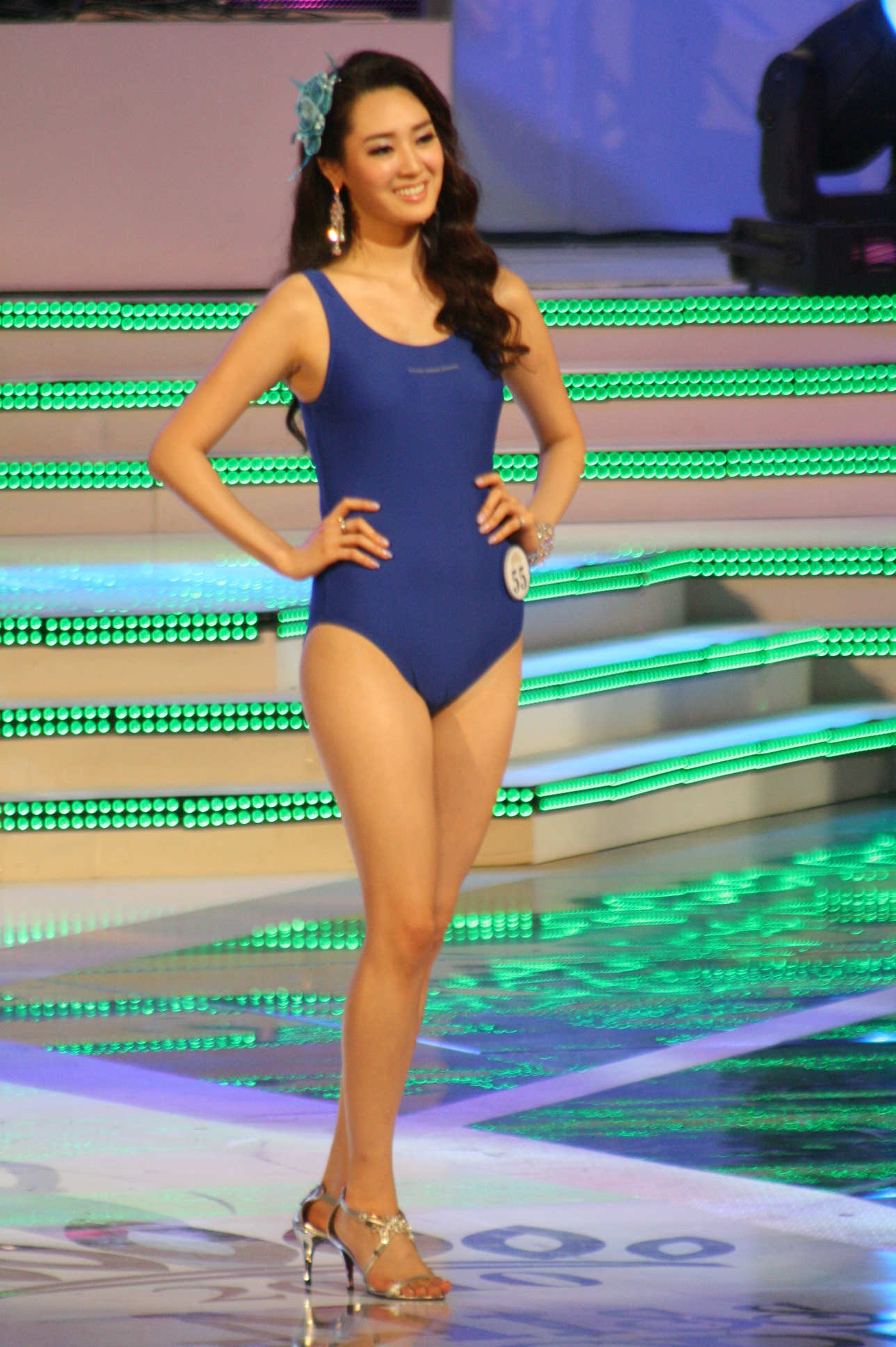
Miss Universe Korea 2011 Chong So-ra

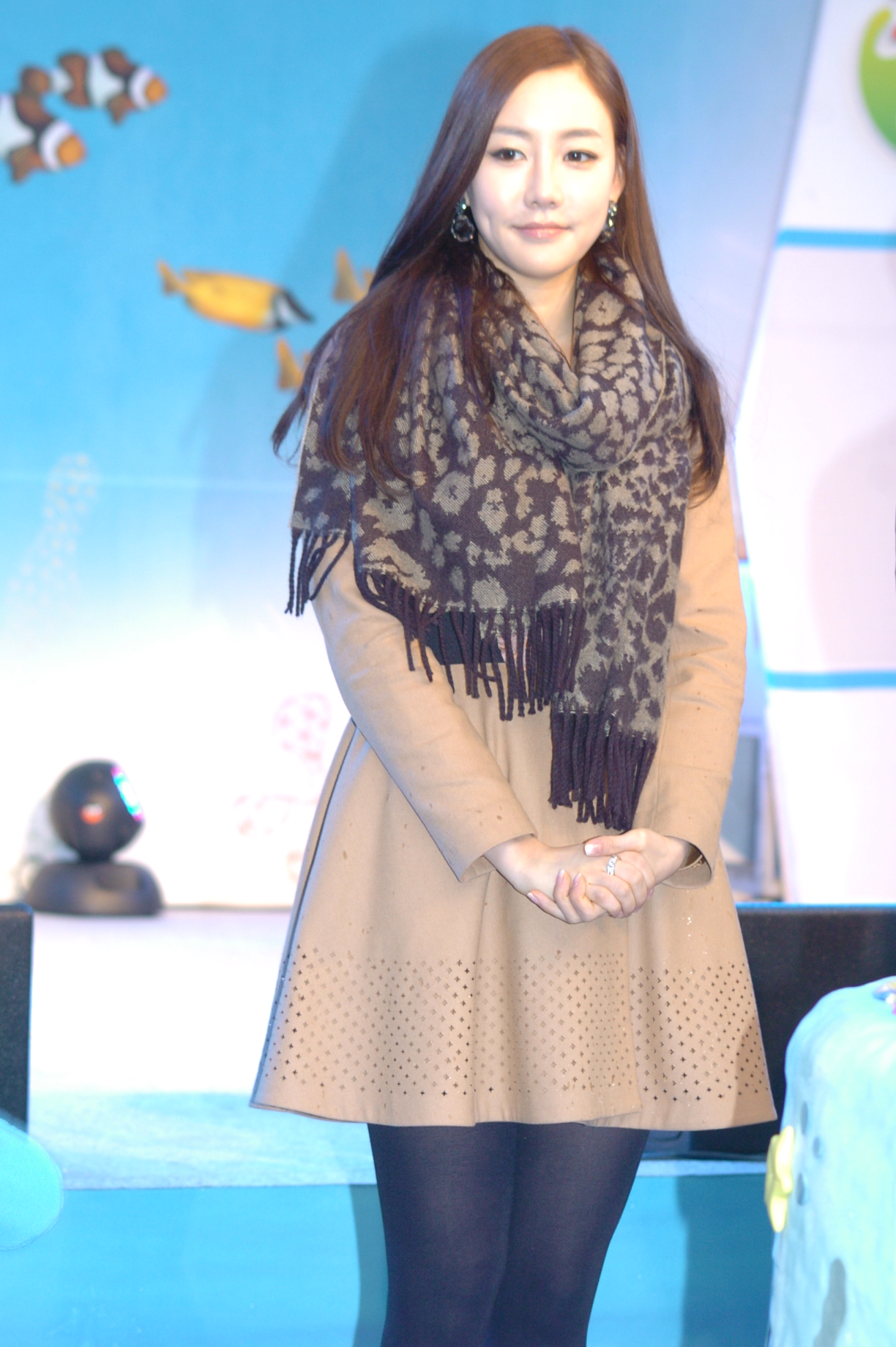
Miss Universe Korea 2012 Lee Sung-hye

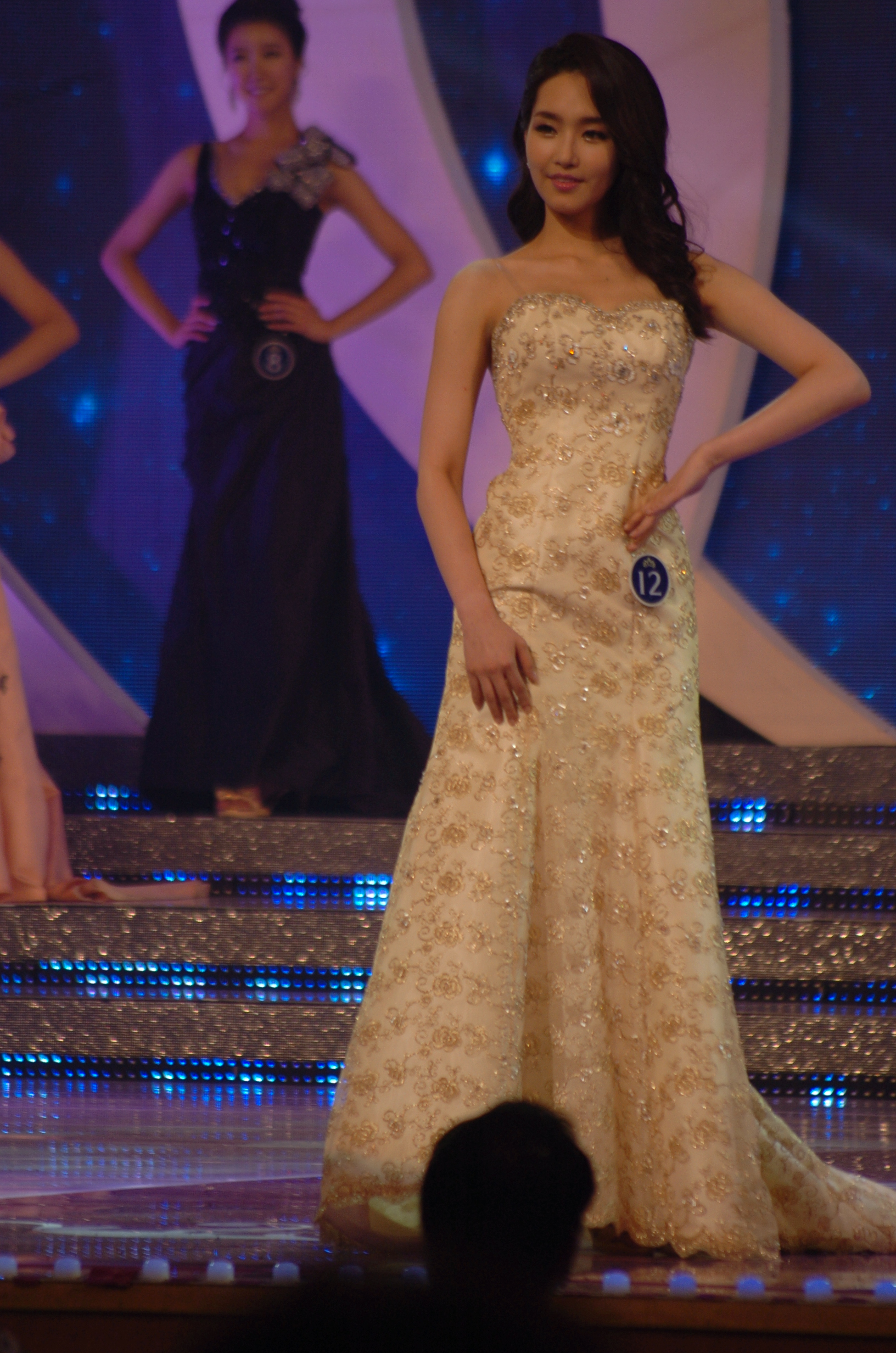
Miss Universe Korea 2013 Kim Yu-mi

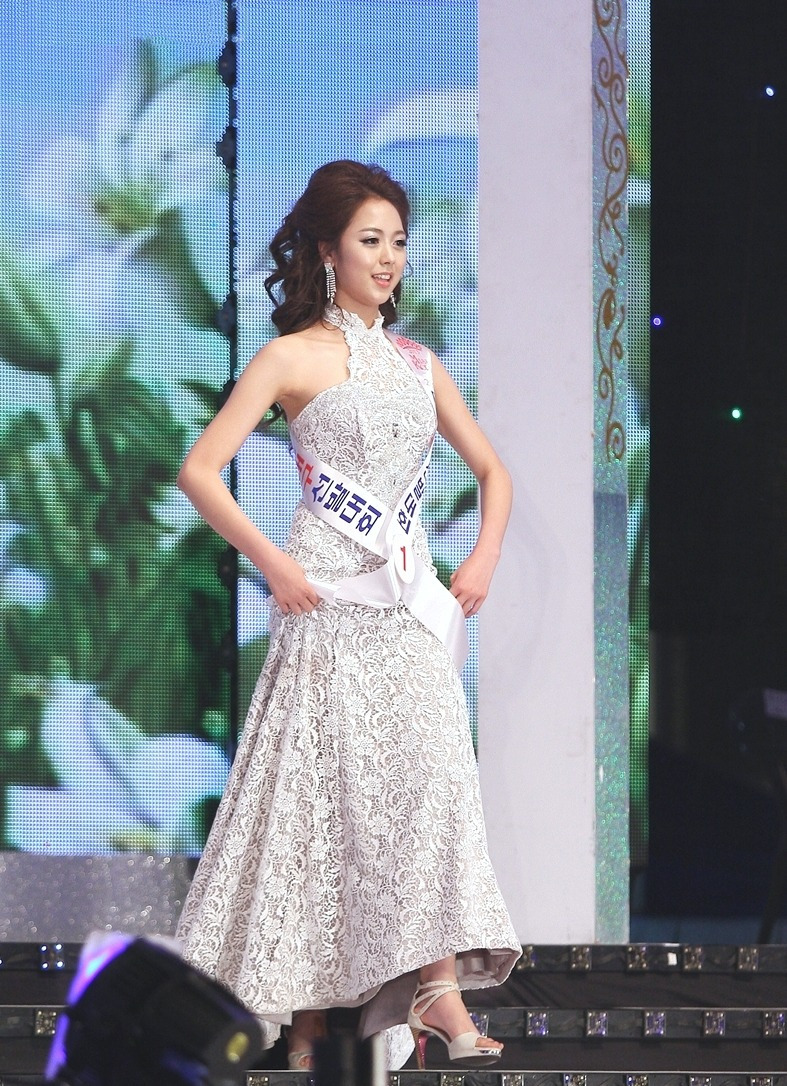
Miss Universe Korea 2014 Yoo Ye-bin

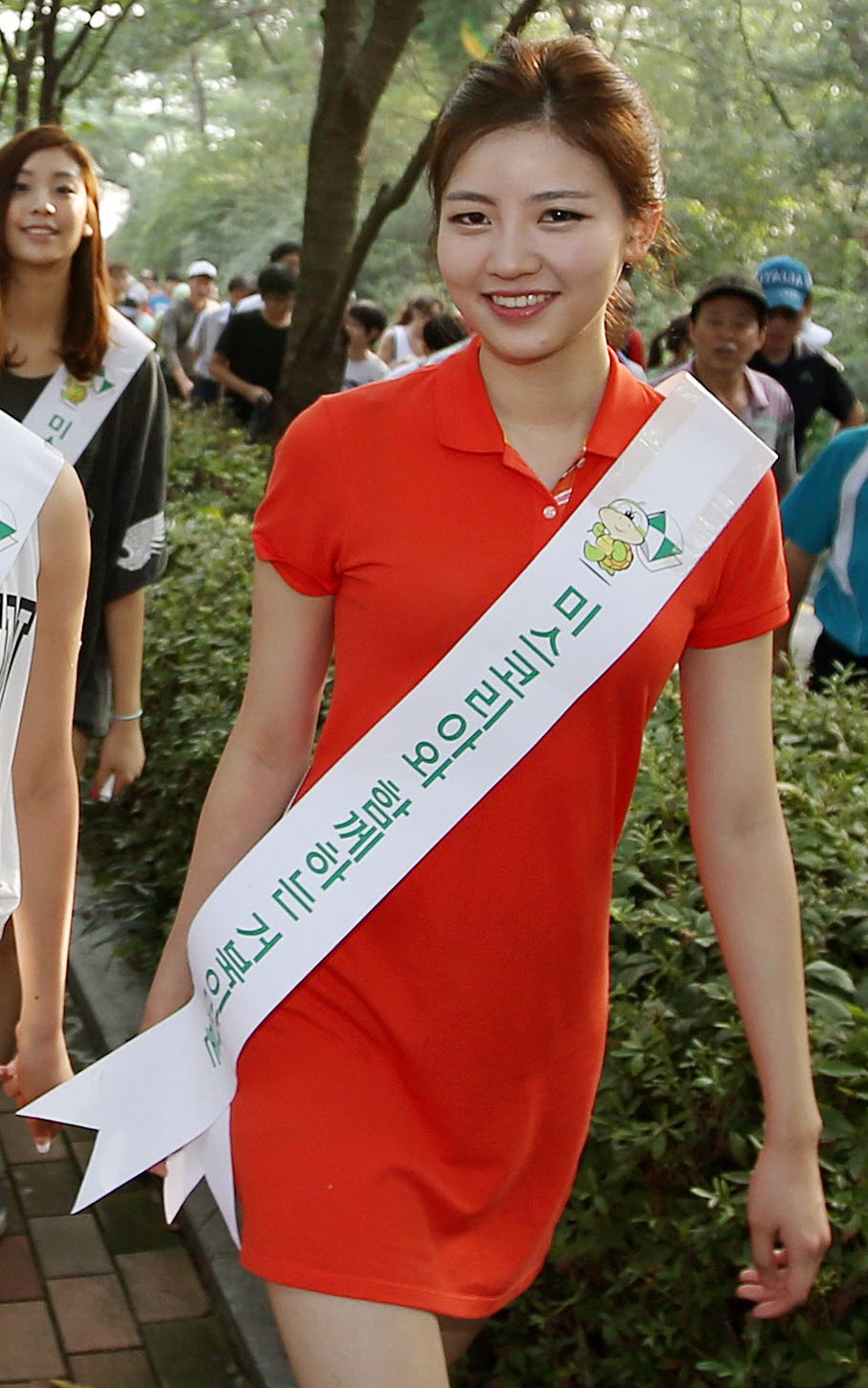
Miss Universe Korea 2015 Kim Seo-yeon

=== Miss World Korea 1959—2010 ===
Korea debuted at Miss World in 1959. The 1st Runner-up of Miss Korea represented the nation at Miss World. Since 2011, Korean representatives at the Miss World are chosen in a separate pageant Miss World Korea, that separate contest is to only focus on Miss World.

Miss Korea
Year	Residence	Representative	Korean Name	National Title	Placement at MW	Special Awards
1959	Seoul	Seo Jung-ae	서정애	1st Runner-up of 1959	Unplaced	
1960	Seoul	Lee Young-hee	이영희	2nd Runner-up of 1960	Top 10	
1961	Seoul	Hyun Chang-ae	현창애	2nd Runner-up of 1961	Unplaced	
1962	Seoul	Chung Tae-ja	정태자	2nd Runner-up of 1962	Unplaced	
1963	Seoul	Choi Keum-shil	최금실	2nd Runner-up of 1963	Top 14	
1964	Seoul	Yoon Mi-hee	윤미희	2nd Runner-up of 1964	Unplaced	
1965	Seoul	Lee Eun-ah	이은아	2nd Runner-up of 1965	Top 16	
1966	Jeonnam	Chung Eul-sun	정을선	2nd Runner-up of 1966	Unplaced	
1967	Seoul	Chung Young-hwa	정영화	2nd Runner-up of 1967	Unplaced	
1968	Seoul	Lee Ji-eun	이지은	2nd Runner-up of 1968	Unplaced	
1969	Seoul	Kim Seung-hee	김승희	2nd Runner-up of 1969	Unplaced	
1970	Seoul	Lee Jung-hee	이정희	2nd Runner-up of 1970	Unplaced	
1971	Gyeonggi	Lee Young-eun	이영은	4th Runner-up of 1971	Unplaced	
1972	Jeonbuk	Chung Keum-ok	정금옥	4th Runner-up of 1972	Did not compete	
1973	Seoul	An Soon-young	안순영	5th Runner-up of 1973	Unplaced	
1974	Seoul	Shim Kyoung-sook	심경숙	2nd Runner-up of 1974	Unplaced	
1975	Seoul	Lee Sung-hee	이성희	1st Runner-up of 1975	Unplaced	
1976	California	Shin Byoung-sook	신병숙	3rd Runner-up of 1976	Unplaced	
1977	Seoul	Kim Soon-ae	김순애	5th Runner-up of 1977	Unplaced	
1978	Gangwon	Je Eun-jin	제은진	5th Runner-up of 1978	Unplaced	
1979	California	Hong Yeo-jin	홍여진	1st Runner-up of 1979	Unplaced	
1980	Seoul	Chang Sun-ja	장선자	1st Runner-up of 1980	Unplaced	
1981	California	Lee Han-na	이한나	1st Runner-up of 1981	Unplaced	
1982	Seoul	Choi Sung-yoon	최성윤	1st Runner-up of 1982	Unplaced	
1983	Seoul	Seo Min-sook	서민숙	2nd Runner-up of 1983	Unplaced	
1984	Seoul	Lee Joo-hee	이주희	3rd Runner-up of 1984	Unplaced	
1985	Seoul	Park Eun-kyoung	박은경	5th Runner-up of 1984	Unplaced	
1986	New York	An Jung-mi	안정미	1st Runner-up of 1985	Unplaced	
1987	Seoul	Chung Myoung-sun	정명선	2nd Runner-up of 1986	Unplaced	
1988	Seoul	Choi Yeon-hee	최연희	1st Runner-up of 1987: Note: World Miss University Korea 1986	1st Runner-up	2 Special Awards: Beauty Queen of Asia; 2nd place - Local viewer phone popularity vote
1989	Seoul	Kim Hye-ri	김혜리	1st Runner-up of 1988	Unplaced	
1990	Seoul	Go Hyun-jung	고현정	1st Runner-up of 1989	Unplaced	
1991	Seoul	Kim Tae-hwa	김태화	1st Runner-up of 1990	Unplaced	
1992	Seoul	Lee Mi-young	이미영	2nd Runner-up of 1991	Unplaced	
1992	Seoul	Yum Jung-ah	염정아	1st Runner-up of 1991	Did not compete (Changed participation in MI)	
1993	Seoul	Lee Seung-yeon	이승연	2nd Runner-up of 1992	Top 10 (7th Place)	
1993	Seoul	Chang Eun-young	장은영	1st Runner-up of 1992	Did not compete (Changed participation in MI)	
1994	Seoul	Chae Yeon-hee	채연희	3rd Runner-up of 1993	Unplaced	
1995	New York	Choi Yoon-young	최윤영	1st Runner-up of 1995	Top 5 (5th place)	1 Special Awards: Beauty Queen of Asia & Oceania
1996	Seoul	Seol Soo-jin	설수진	1st Runner-up of 1996	Unplaced	
1997	Daejeon	Kim Jin-ah	김진아	1st Runner-up of 1997	Unplaced	
1998	Jeonbuk	Kim Kun-woo	김건우	1st Runner-up of 1998	Unplaced	
1999	Seoul	Han Na-na	한나나	1st Runner-up of 1999	Unplaced	
2000	Jeonbuk	Shin Jung-sun	신정선	1st Runner-up of 2000	Unplaced	
2001	Daegu	Seo Hyun-jin	서현진	1st Runner-up of 2001	Unplaced	1 Special Awards: Best Dress Design Award
2002	Seoul	Chang Yoo-kyoung	장유경	1st Runner-up of 2002	Withdrew	
2003	Jeonbuk	Park Ji-yea	박지예	1st Runner-up of 2003	Unplaced	1 Special Awards: Talent Show Top 21
2004	Gyeonggi	Han Kyoung-jin	한경진	1st Runner-up of 2004	Unplaced	1 Special Awards: Talent Show Top 25
2005	Seoul	Oh Eun-young	오은영	1st Runner-up of 2005	Top 6 (4th place)	3 Special Awards: Beauty Queen of Asia Pacific; Beauty With A Purpose; Talent Show Top 16 (Best Original Performance Second Place)
2006	Incheon	Park Sharon	박샤론	1st Runner-up of 2006	Unplaced	1 Special Awards: Miss World Sports Top 24
2007	Jeju Island	Cho Eun-ju	조은주	1st Runner-up of 2007: Note: World Miss University Korea 2009	Unplaced	2 Special Awards: Best Dress Design Award; Beach Beauty Top 21
2008	Seoul	Choi Bo-in	최보인	1st Runner-up of 2008	Unplaced	
2009	Seoul	Kim Joo-ri	김주리	Miss Korea 2009	Top 16	4 Special Awards: Beauty Queen of Asia & Oceania; Runner Up 1 - Talent Show; Best Dress Design Award Top 12; Beach Beauty Top 20
2010	Gyeongbuk	Kim Hye-young	김혜영	1st Runner-up of 2010	Unplaced	1 Special Awards: Talent Show Top 10
List of Miss World Participant from 2011–present

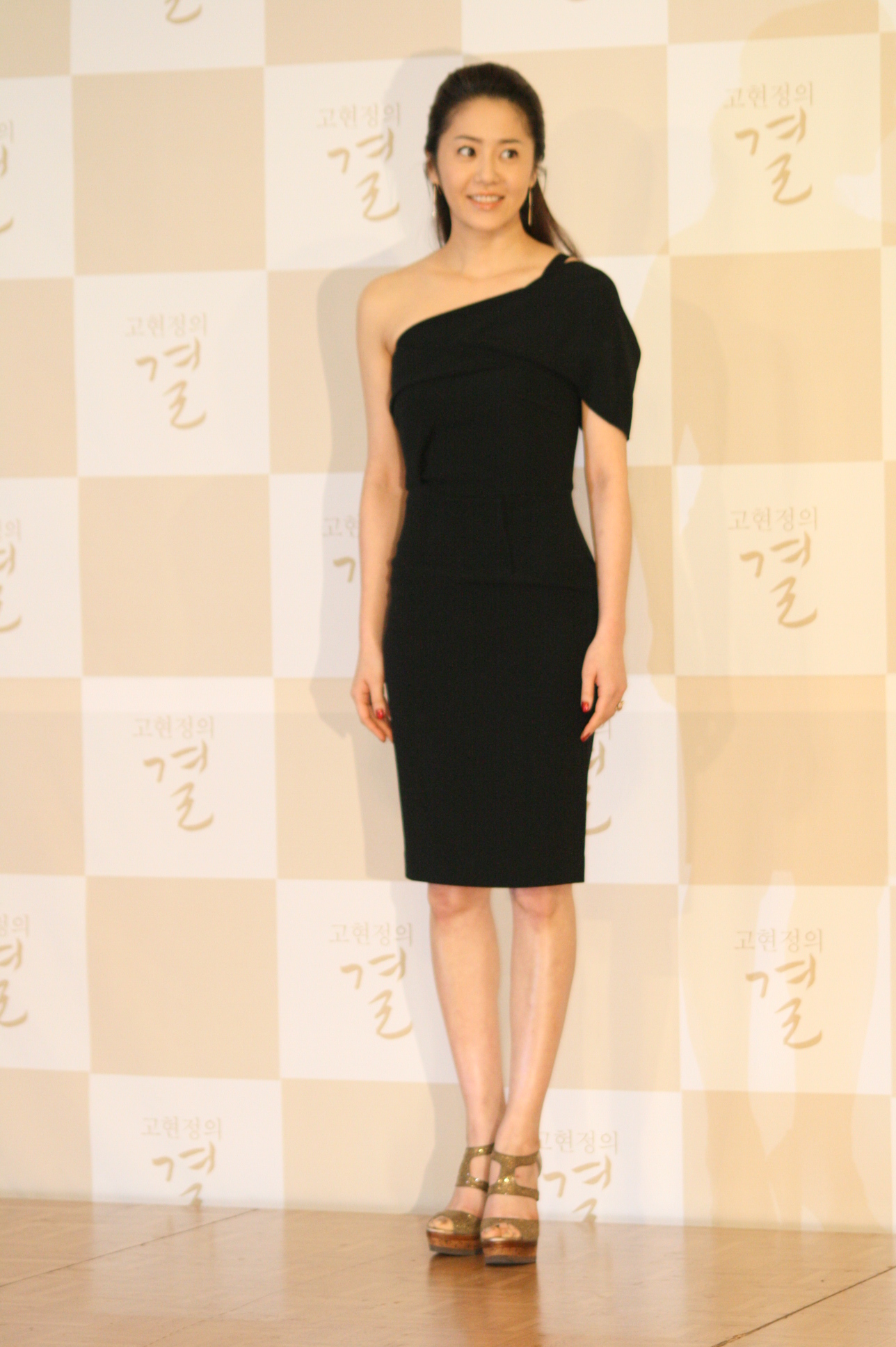
Miss World Korea 1990 Go Hyun-jung

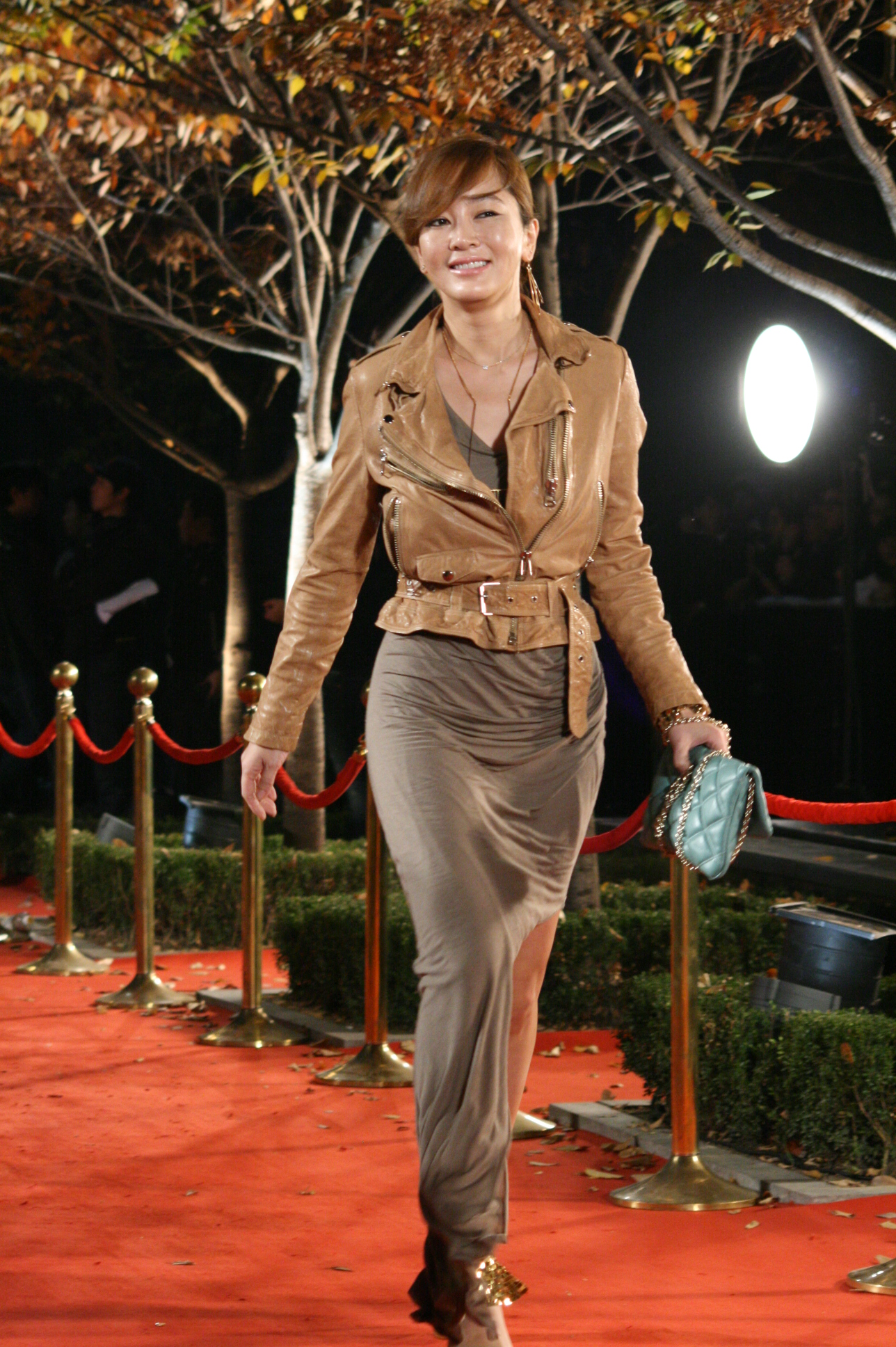
Miss World Korea 1993 Lee Seung-yeon

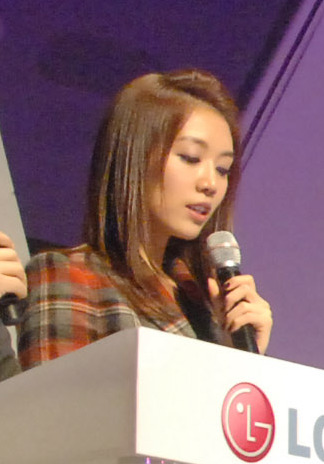
Miss World Korea 2001 Seo Hyun-jin

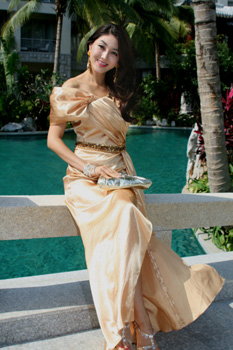
Miss World Korea 2007 Cho Eun-ju

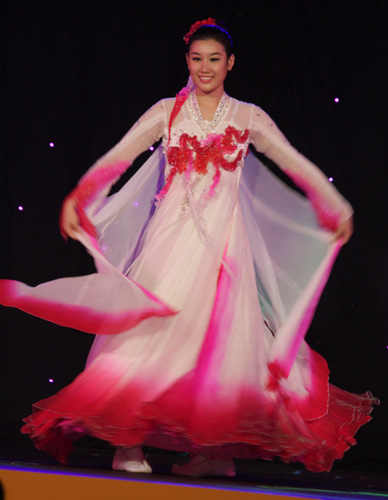
Miss World Korea 2008 Choi Bo-in

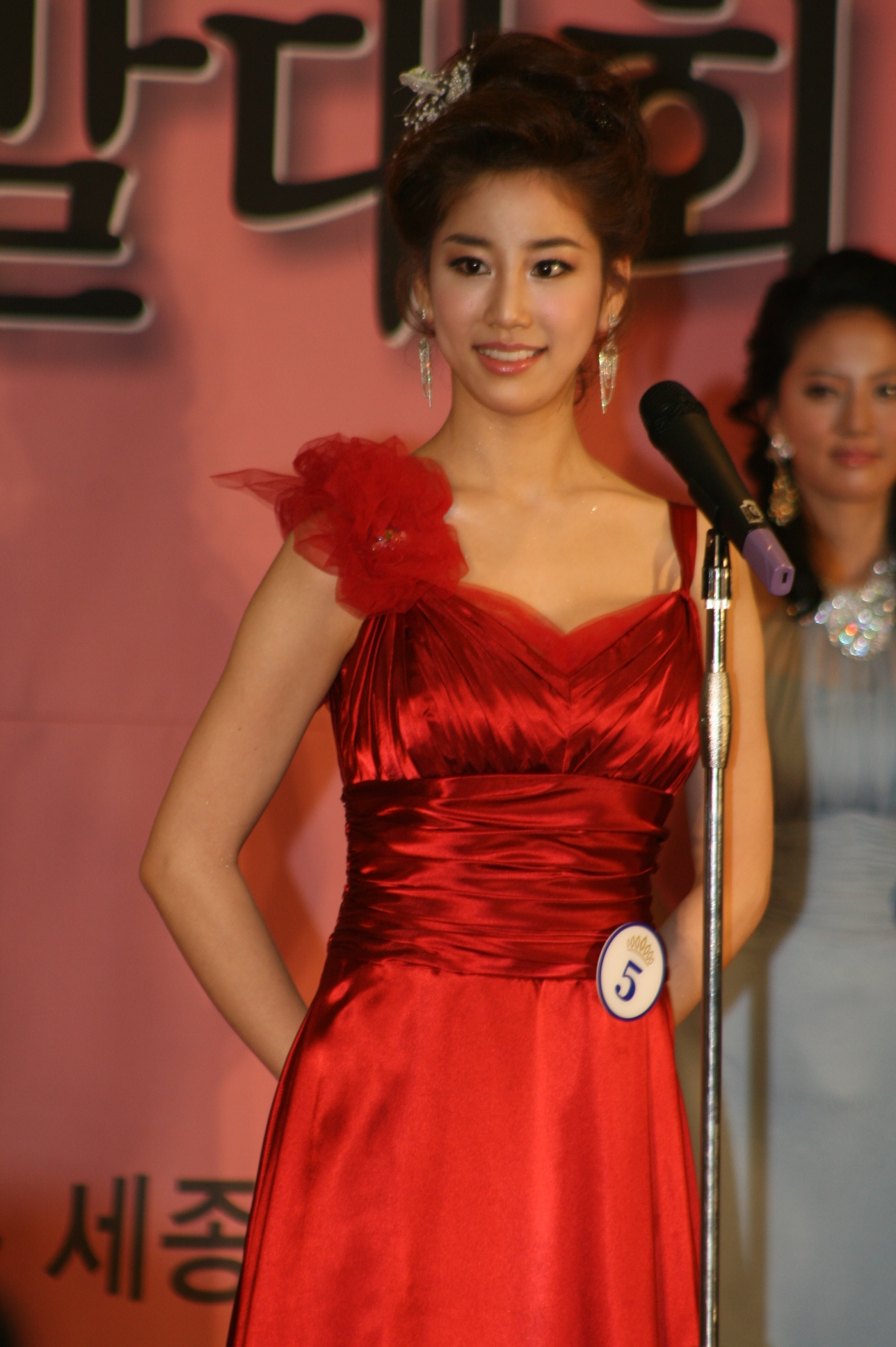
Miss World Korea 2009 Kim Joo-ri

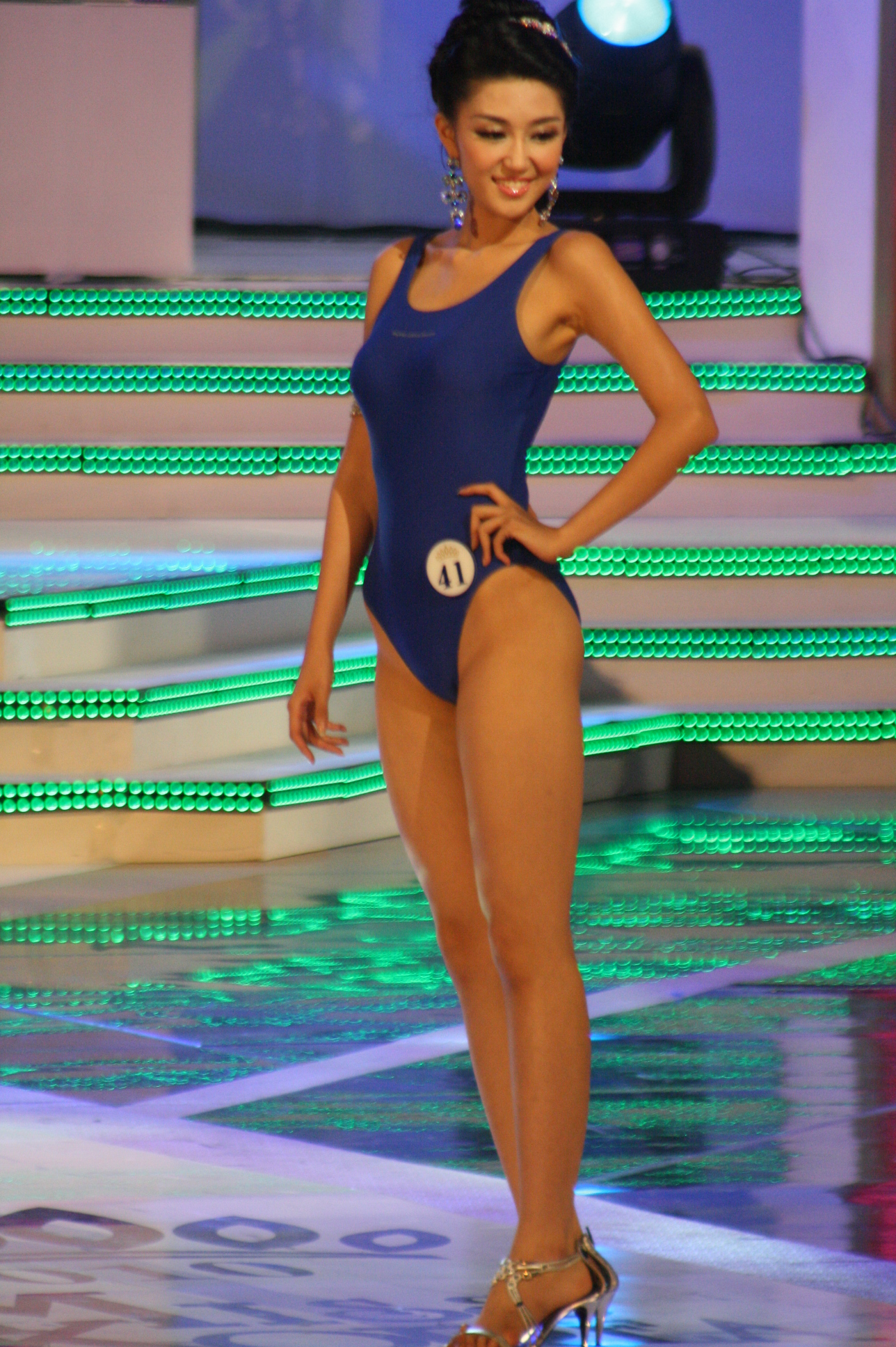
Miss World Korea 2010 Kim Hye-young

=== Miss International Korea 1960—2024 ===
Korea debuted at Miss International in 1960. The 1st Runner-up of Miss Korea represented the nation at Miss International. Since 2025, Korean representatives at the Miss International are chosen in a separate pageant Korea Beauty Pageant Organization (KBO).

Miss Korea
Year	Residence	Representative	Korean Name	National Title	Placement at MI	Special Awards
1960	Seoul	Kim Jung-ja	김정자	1st Runner-up of 1960	Unplaced	
1961	Seoul	Lee Ok-ja	이옥자	1st Runner-up of 1961	Unplaced	
1962	Seoul	Sohn Yang-ja	손양자	1st Runner-up of 1962	Unplaced	
1963	Seoul	Choi Yoo-mi	최유미	1st Runner-up of 1963	4th Runner-up	
1964	Seoul	Lee Hye-jin	이혜진	1st Runner-up of 1964	Top 15	
1965	Seoul	Kim Min-jin	김민진	1st Runner-up of 1965	Top 15	
1966	Pageant not held in 1966					
1967	Gyeongbuk	Jin Hyun-soo	진현수	1st Runner-up of 1966	Unplaced	
1968	Seoul	Kim Hee-ja	김희자	1st Runner-up of 1968	Top 15	
1969	Seoul	Kim Yoo-kyoung	김유경	1st Runner-up of 1969	Unplaced	
1970	Seoul	Kim In-sook	김인숙	1st Runner-up of 1970	Unplaced	
1971	Seoul	Choi Sook-ae	최숙애	1st Runner-up of 1971	Unplaced	
1972	Seoul	Suh Yun-hee	서윤희	1st Runner-up of 1972	Unplaced	
1973	Seoul	Kim Mae-ja	김매자	1st Runner-up of 1973	Unplaced	
1974	Seoul	Kang Young-sook	강영숙	4th Runner-up of 1974	Top 15	
1975	Seoul	Lee Hyang-mok	이향목	2nd Runner-up of 1975	Top 15	
1976	Seoul	Han Young-ae	한영애	1st Runner-up of 1976	Unplaced	
1977	California	Shin Byoung-ok	신병옥	2nd Runner-up of 1976	Unplaced	
1978	Seoul	Chae Jung-sook	채정숙	1st Runner-up of 1978	Unplaced	
1979	Gyeonggi	Kim Jin-sun	김진선	2nd Runner-up of 1979	Unplaced	
1980	Seoul	Chung Na-young	정나영	4th Runner-up of 1980	Unplaced	
1981	Gwangju	Park Hyun-joo	박현주	3rd Runner-up of 1981	Unplaced	
1982	Seoul	Chung Ae-hee	정애희	3rd Runner-up of 1982	Unplaced	
1983	Seoul	Chung Young-soon	정영순	5th Runner-up of 1983	Top 15	1 Special Awards: Best National Costume
1984	Seoul	Kim Kyoung-ree	김경리	1st Runner-up of 1984	Unplaced	
1985	Daegu	Chang Sih-wha	장시화	2nd Runner-up of 1984	Unplaced	
1986	Seoul	Kim Yoon-jung	김윤정	2nd Runner-up of 1985	Unplaced	
1987	Gyeongnam	Chung Wha-sun	정화선	1st Runner-up of 1986	Unplaced	
1988	Busan	Lee Yoon-hee	이윤희	3rd Runner-up of 1987	Top 15	
1989	Chungbuk	Kim Hee-jung	김희정	2nd Runner-up of 1988	Top 15	1 Special Awards: Best National Costume
1990	California	Shin Soh-young	신소영	3rd Runner-up of 1989	Unplaced	
1991	Incheon	Kwon Jung-joo	권정주	4th Runner-up of 1990	Top 15	
1992	Seoul	Yum Jung-ah	염정아	1st Runner-up of 1991	2nd Runner-up	
1992	Seoul	Lee Mi-young	이미영	2nd Runner-up of 1991	Did not compete (Changed participation in MW)	
1993	Seoul	Chang Eun-young	장은영	1st Runner-up of 1992	Top 15	
1993	Seoul	Lee Seung-yeon	이승연	2nd Runner-up of 1992	Did not compete (Changed participation in MW)	
1994	Gwangju	Sung Hyun-ah	성현아	2nd Runner-up of 1994	Top 15	1 Special Awards: Miss Photogenic
1995	Busan	Lee Yoo-ree	이유리	1st Runner-up of 1994	Top 15	
1996	Daejeon	Kim Jung-hwa	김정화	1st Runner-up of 1995	Top 15	2 Special Awards: Miss Photogenic; Audience Popularity Award
1997	Gyeongbuk	Kim Ryang-hee	김량희	2nd Runner-up of 1996	Top 15	
1998	Busan	Cho Hye-young	조혜영	1st Runner-up of 1997	Top 15	
1999	Daejeon	Lee Jae-won	이재원	2nd Runner-up of 1998	Unplaced	
2000	Daegu	Son Tae-young	손태영	2nd Runner-up of 2000	1st Runner-up	1 Special Awards: Miss Photogenic
2000	Gyeongbuk	Seol Soo-hyun	설수현	2nd Runner-up of 1999	Did not compete (Age Restriction)	
2001	Seoul	Baek Myoung-hee	백명희	2nd Runner-up of 2001	Top 15	1 Special Awards: Best National Costume
2002	Seoul	Gi Yun-ju	기윤주	2nd Runner-up of 2002	Top 12	1 Special Awards: Best National Costume
2003	Seoul	Shin Ji-Su	신지수	1st Runner-up of 2003	Top 12	
2004	Seoul	Kim In-ha	김인하	2nd Runner-up of 2004	Top 15	
2005	Chungbuk	Lee Kyoung-eun	이경은	1st Runner-up of 2005	Unplaced	
2006	Chungbuk	Jang Yun-seo	장윤서	1st Runner-up of 2006	2nd Runner-up	1 Special Awards: Miss Arouge
2007	Seoul	Park Ka-won	박가원	1st Runner-up of 2007	Top 15	
2008	Daegu	Kim Min-jeong	김민정	1st Runner-up of 2008	Unplaced	
2009	Daegu	Seo Eun-mi	서은미	1st Runner-up of 2009	1st Runner-up	1 Special Awards: Miss Photogenic
2010	Seoul	Ko Hyeon-young	고현영	2nd Runner-up of 2010	Top 15	
2011	Incheon	Kim Hye-sun	김혜선	1st Runner-up of 2011	Unplaced	
2012	Gwangju	Lee Jeong-bin	이정빈	1st Runner-up of 2012	Unplaced	
2013	Incheon	Han Ji-eun	한지은	1st Runner-up of 2013	Unplaced	
2014	Gyeonggi	Lee Seo-bin	이서빈	1st Runner-up of 2014	Unplaced	
2015	Daegu	Park Ah-reum	박아름	2nd Runner-up of 2015	Unplaced	1 Special Awards: Miss International Asia
2015	Gwangju	Kim Ye-rin	김예린	1st Runner-up of 2015	Did not compete	
2016	Daegu	Kim Min-jeong	김민정	2nd Runner-up of 2016	Unplaced	
2017	Seoul	Nam Seung-woo	남승우	2nd Runner-up of 2017	Unplaced	2 Special Awards: Miss International Asia; Panasonic Awards (10th Place)
2018	Seoul	Seo Ye-jin	서예진	1st Runner-up of 2018	Unplaced	
Did not compete in 2019 & Due to the impact of COVID-19 pandemic, no competition held between 2020 and 2021
2022	Gyeongbuk	Kim Su-jin	김수진	1st Runner-up of 2021	Unplaced	
2023	Seoul	Jung Bo-bin	정보빈	2nd Runner-up of 2021	Unplaced	
2024	Gangwon	Chung Gyu-ri	정규리	1st Runner-up of 2023	Unplaced	
List of Miss International Participant from 2025–present

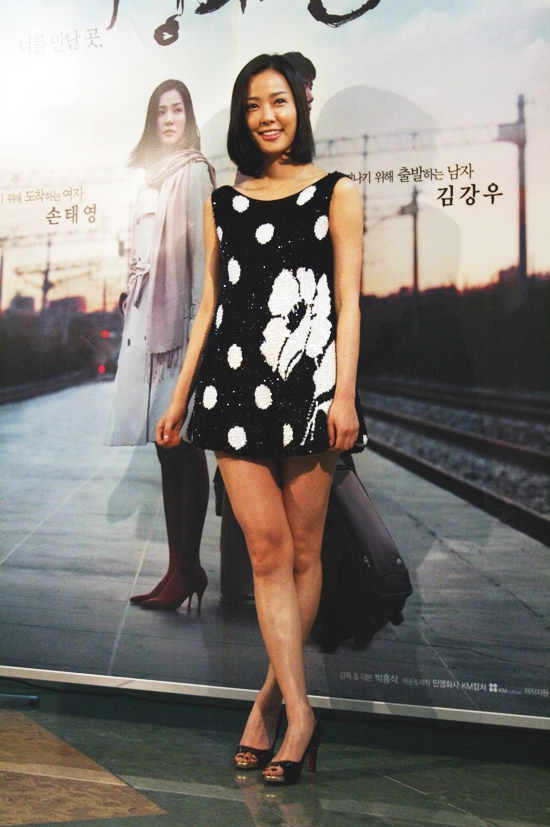
Miss International Korea 2000 Son Tae-young

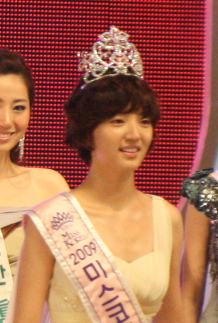
Miss International Korea 2009 Seo Eun-mi

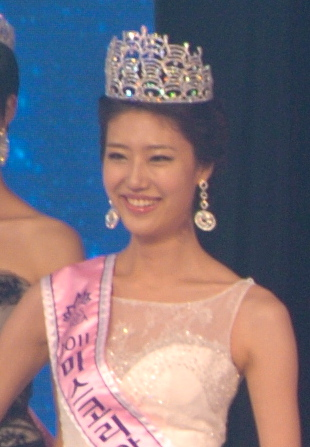
Miss International Korea 2011 Kim Hye-sun

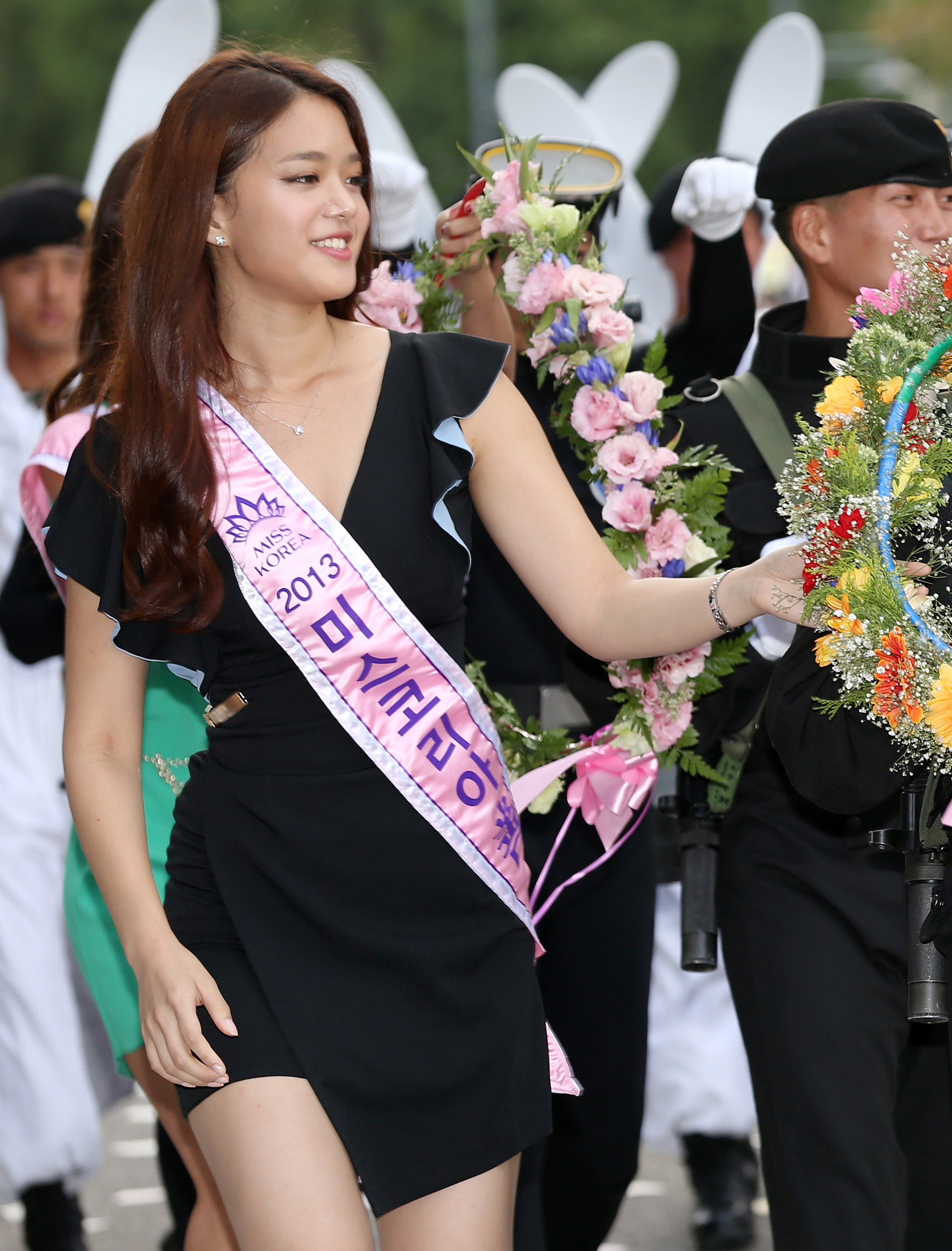
Miss International Korea 2013 Han Ji-eun

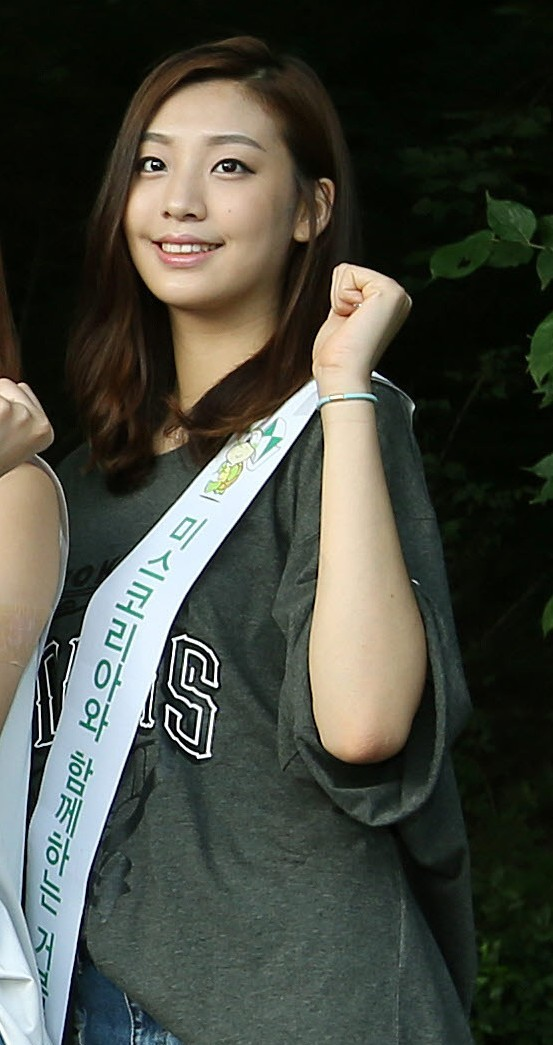
Miss International Korea 2014 Lee Seo-bin

=== Miss Earth Korea 2002—2024 ===
Korea debuted at Miss Earth in 2002. The 1st Runner-up of Miss Korea represented the nation at Miss Earth. Since 2025, Korean representative for Miss Earth will be selected through the Miss Earth Korea pageant.

Miss Korea
Year	Residence	Representative	Korean Name	National Title	Placement at ME	Special Awards
2002	Seoul	Lee Jin-ah	이진아	3rd Runner-up of 2002	Unplaced	2 Special Awards: Best in National Costume; Miss Discovery Spa
2003	Seoul	Oh Yoo-mi	오유미	2nd Runner-up of 2003	Unplaced	
2004	Seoul	Cho Hye-jin	조혜진	3rd Runner-up of 2004	Unplaced	
2005	Gyeonggi	Yoo Hye-mi	유혜미	2nd Runner-up of 2005	Top 16	2 Special Awards: Best in National Costume; Miss Pond's
2006	Seoul	Park Hee-jung	박희정	2nd Runner-up of 2006	Unplaced	
2007	Seoul	Yoo Ji-eun	유지은	2nd Runner-up of 2007	Unplaced	2 Special Awards: Miss Fontana; Miss Charm
2007	Seoul	Lee Jin	이진	2nd Runner-up of 2007	Did not compete	
2008	Gyeongbuk	Seo Seol-hee	서설희	2nd Runner-up of 2008	Top 16	1 Special Awards: Miss Pasigandahan
2009	Seoul	Park Ye-ju	박예주	2nd Runner-up of 2009	Top 16	2 Special Awards: Miss Eagle Express; Miss Asei
2010	Jeonbuk	Lee Gui-joo	이귀주	2nd Runner-up of 2010	Unplaced	1 Special Awards: Top 5 Miss Aodai
2011	Gyeongbuk	Kim E-seul	김이슬	1st Runner-up of 2011	Unplaced	1 Special Awards: Miss Fashion
2012	Seoul	Kim Sa-ra	김사라	1st Runner-up of 2012	Top 16	3 Special Awards: (bronze) Swimsuit (Group 2); (silver) TRESemmé Hair Challenge; (silver) Miss Friendship (Group 2)
2013	Brazil	Choi Song-yi	최송이	2nd Runner-up of 2013	Miss Fire (3rd Runner-Up)	1 Special Awards: (silver) I Love My Planet Schools Challenge (Group 2)
2013	Gwangju	Kim Hyo-hee	김효희	1st Runner-up of 2013	Did not compete	
2014	Gyeongbuk	Shin Su-min	신수민	1st Runner-up of 2014	Top 16	
2015	United States	Han Ho-jeong	한호정	2nd Runner-up of 2015	Unplaced	1 Special Awards: (bronze) National Costume (Asia & Oceania)
2016	Gwangju	Lee Chae-yeung	이채영	2nd Runner-up of 2016	Top 16	1 Special Awards: Top 10 - Miss Earth Hannah
2017	Philippines	Lee Hannah	이한나	1st Runner-up of 2017	Unplaced	1 Special Awards: (gold) Miss Friendship (Group 1)
2018	Daegu	Song Su-hyun	송수현	1st Runner-up of 2018	Unplaced	
2019	Busan	Woo Hee-jun	우희준	1st Runner-up of 2019	Unplaced	2 Special Awards: Miss Jolly Waves (Fire); (bronze) Talent (Fire)
Miss Earth 2020, Miss Earth 2021 (The COVID-19 pandemic caused virtual coronation) Did not compete
2022	Incheon	Mina Sue Choi	최미나수	1st Runner-up of 2021	Miss Earth 2022	5 Special Awards: (gold) Swimsuit Competition (Asia & Oceania); (gold) Beach Wear (Air); (gold) Best in Long Gown (Air); (bronze) Best in Resort Wear (Air); Miss Mexico Pampanga (Air)
2023	Daegu	Jang Da-yeon	장다연	2nd Runner-up of 2023	Unplaced	1 Special Awards: Top 5 Best Evening Gown
2024	Busan	Ryu Seo-bin	류서빈	1st Runner-up of 2020	Top 20	1 Special Awards: Best in Appearance (Asia & Oceania) (Vote)
List of Miss Earth Participant from 2025–present

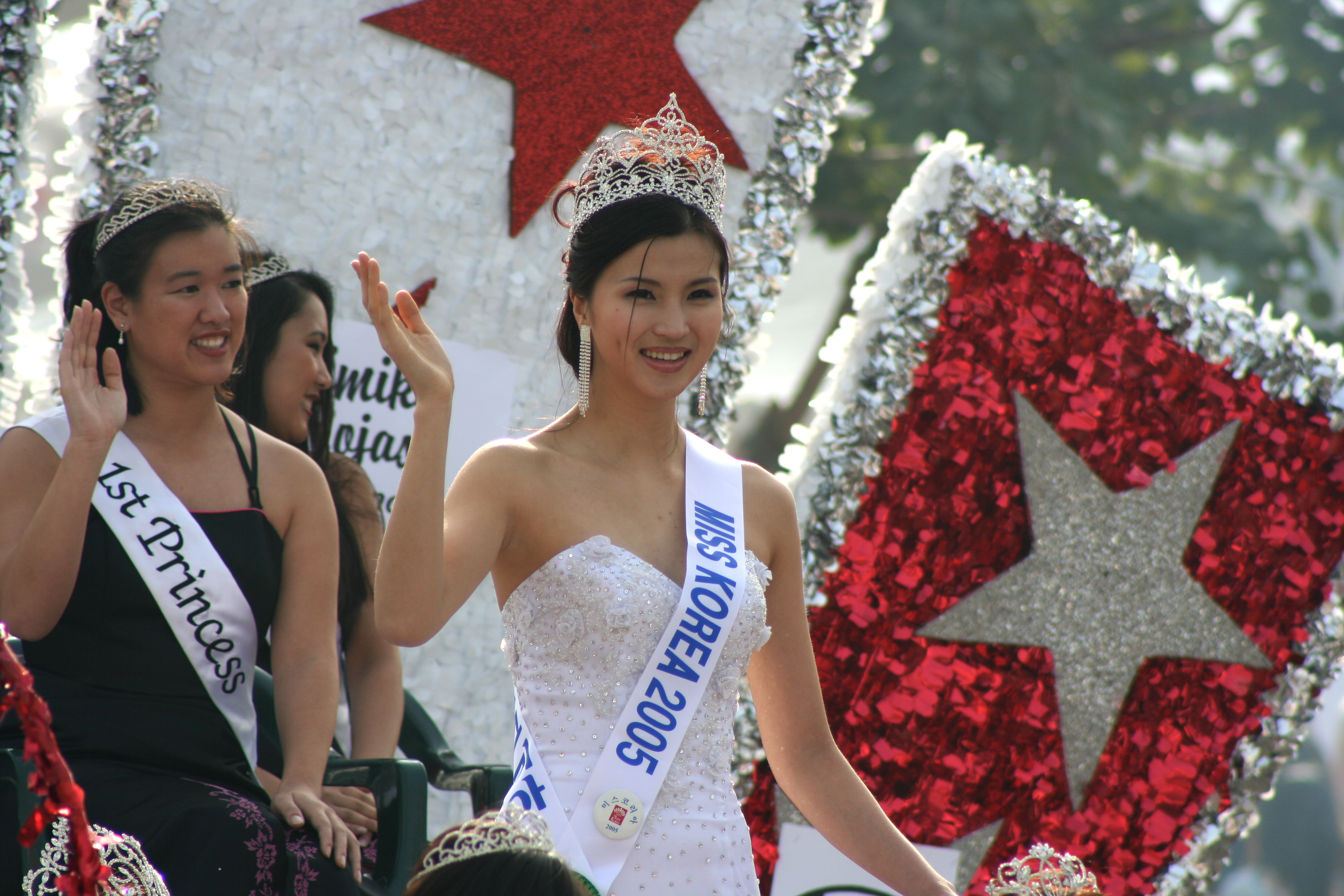
Miss Earth Korea 2005 Yoo Hye-mi

Miss Earth Korea 2008 Seo Seol-hee during the Miss Earth 2008 pageant

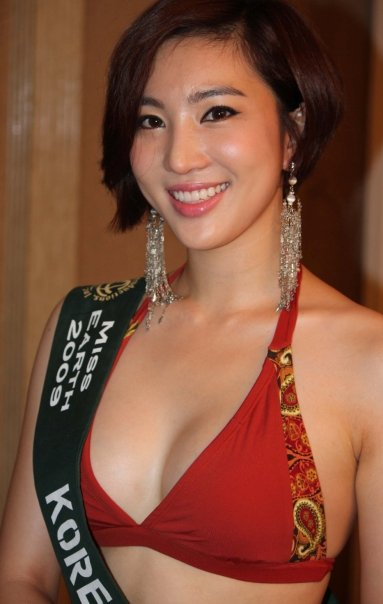
Miss Earth Korea 2009 Park Ye-ju during the Press presentation in the Miss Earth 2009 pageant

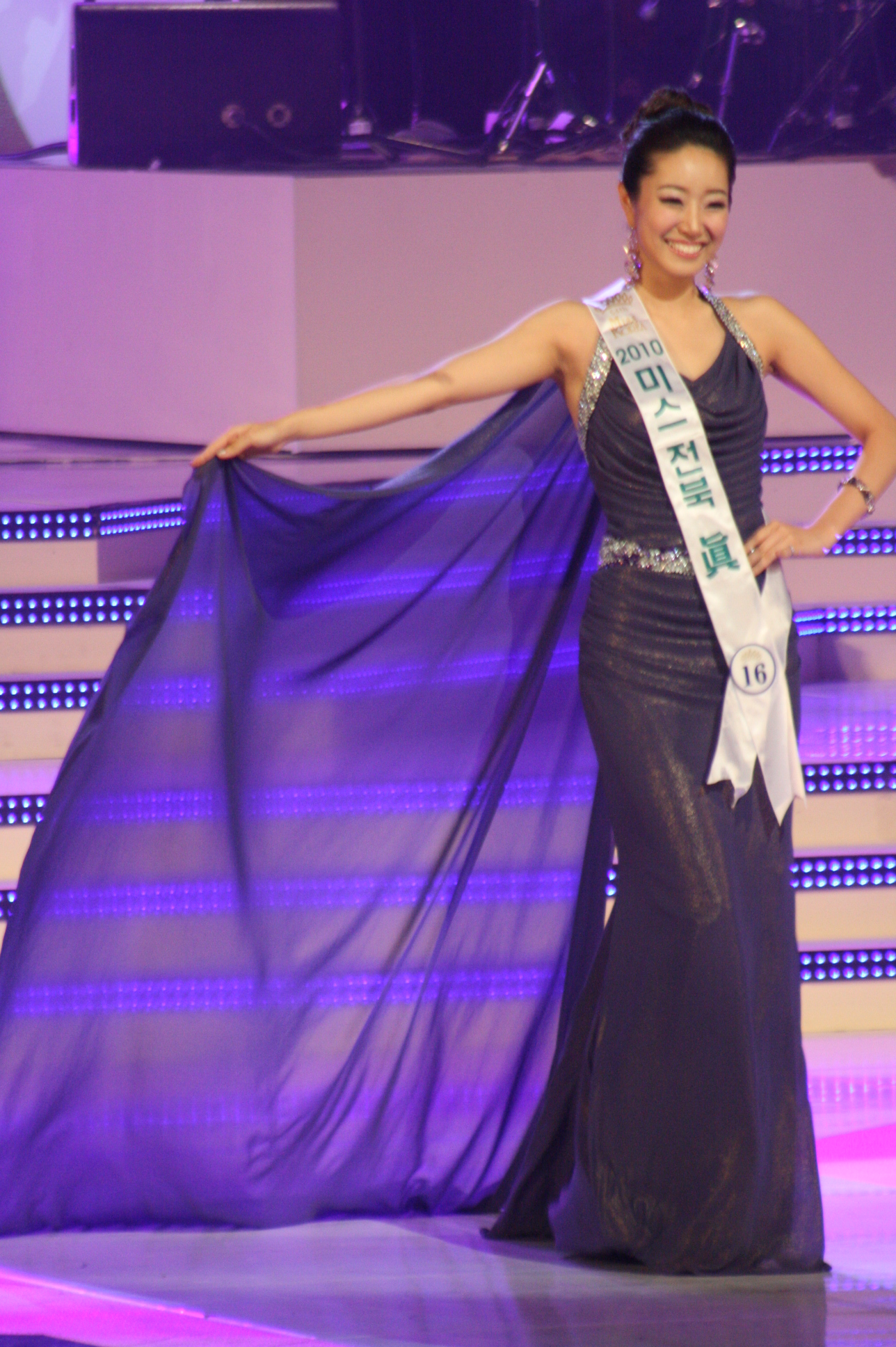
Miss Earth Korea 2010 Lee Gui-joo

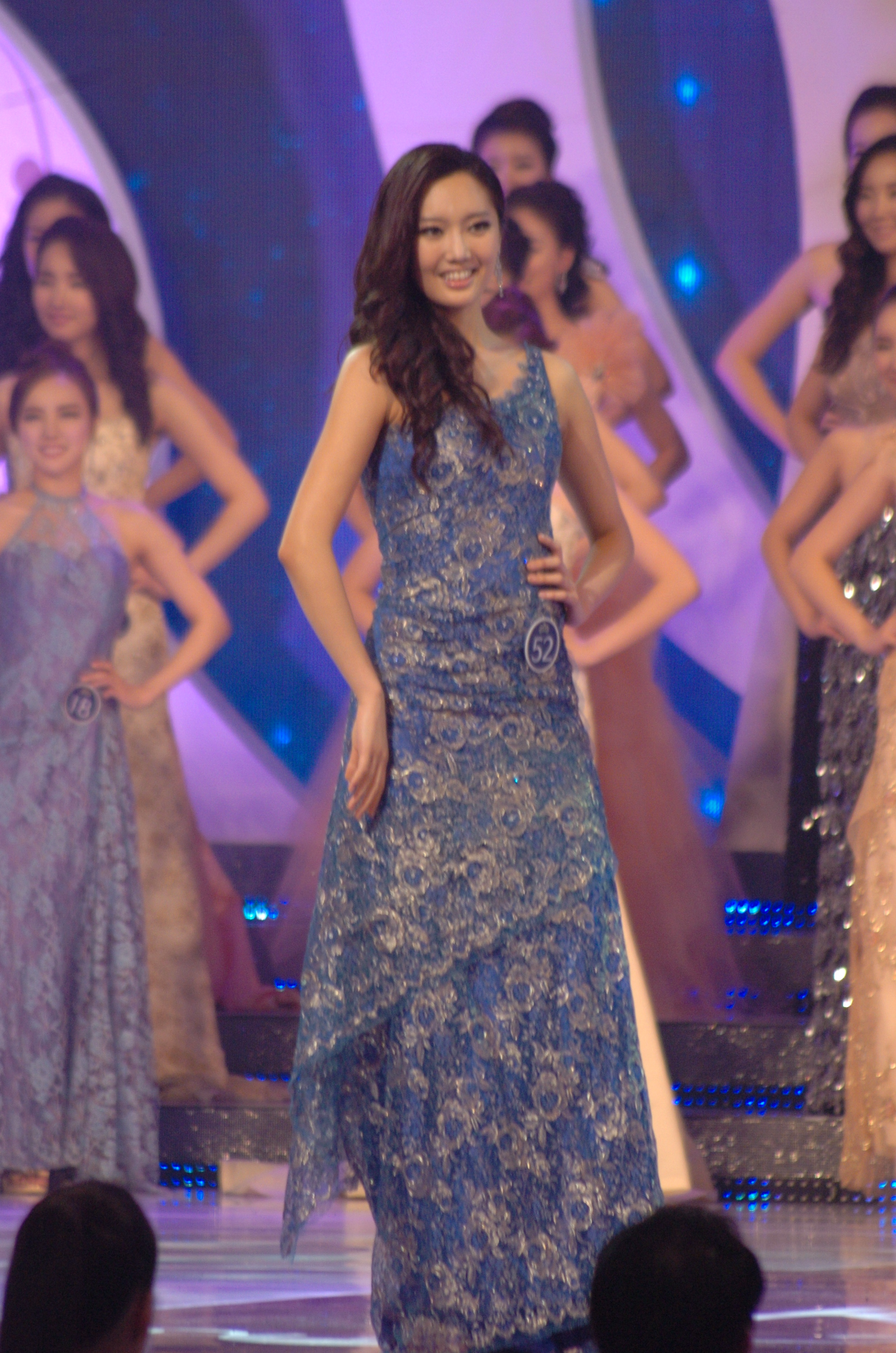
Miss Earth Korea 2012 Kim Sa-ra

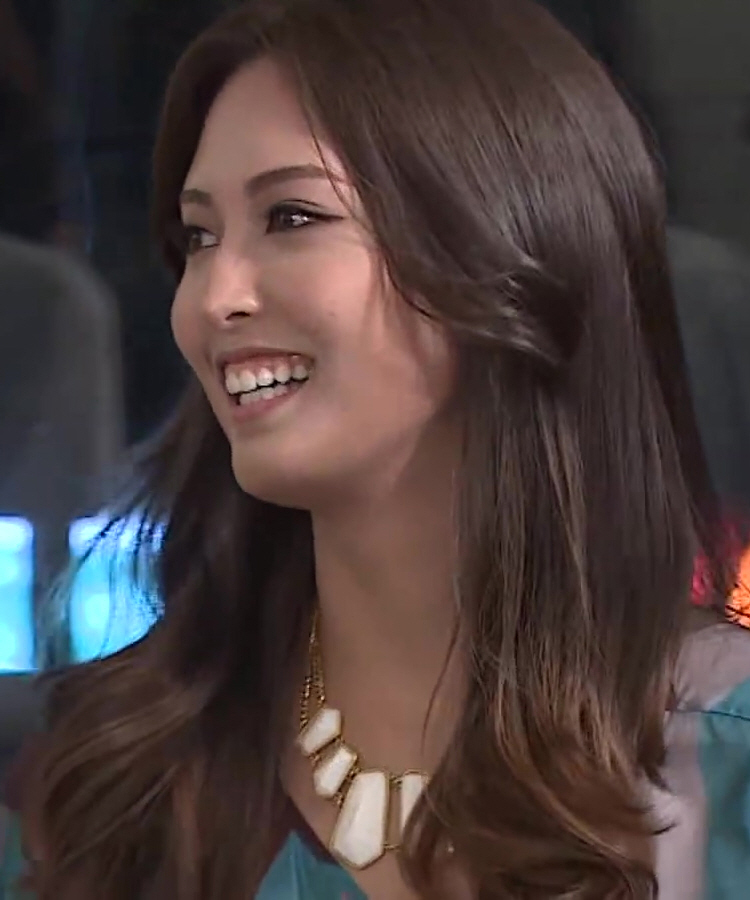
Miss Earth Korea 2013 Choi Song-yi

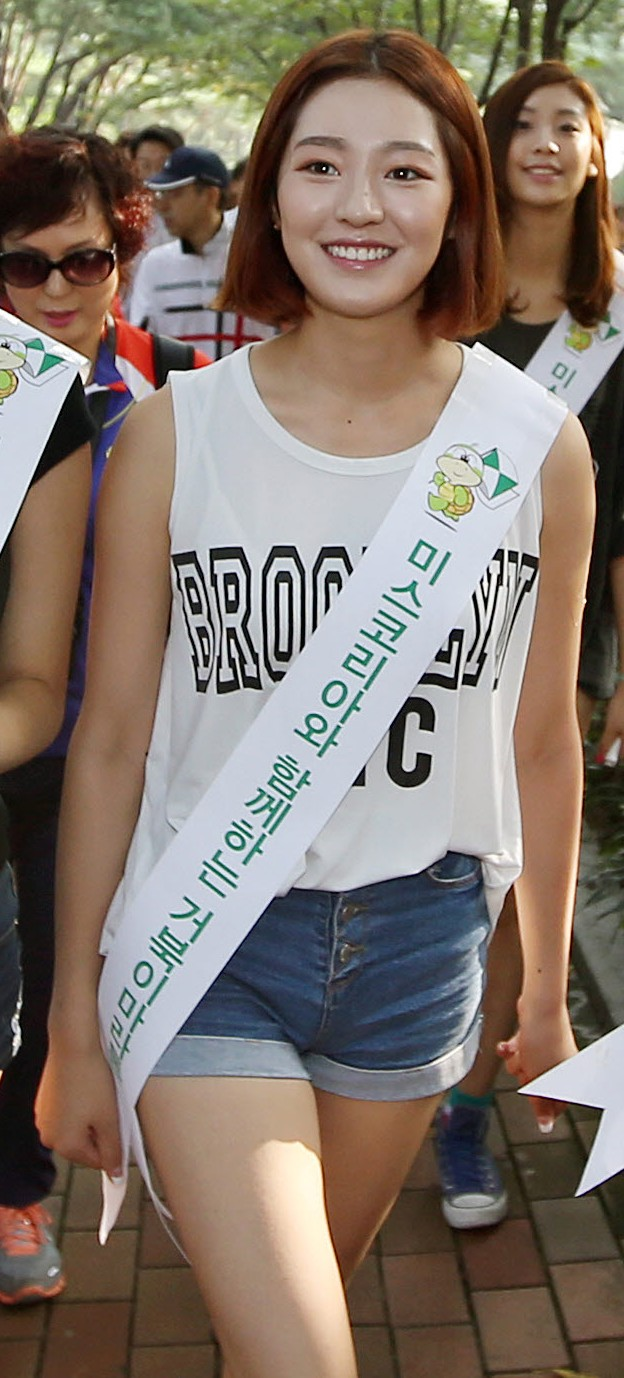
Miss Earth Korea 2014 Shin Su-min

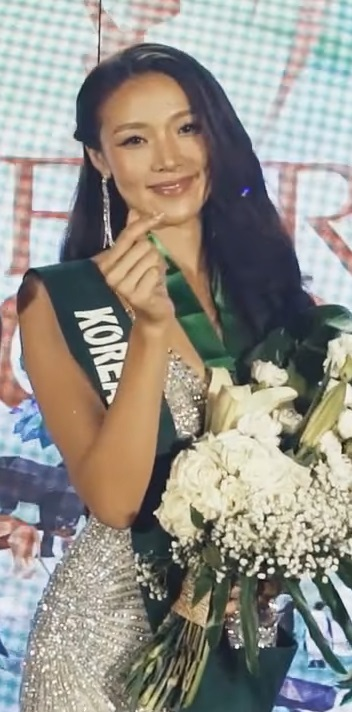
Miss Earth Korea 2022 Choi Mi-na-su when she got the gold medal for Preliminary Long Gown Competition in the Miss Earth 2022 pageant.

=== Miss Supranational Korea ===
Miss Korea
Year	Residence	Representative	Korean Name	National Title	Placement at MS	Special Awards
2010	Daejeon	You Soo-jung	유수정	2nd Runner-up of 2009	Top 20 (10th Place)	1 Special Awards: Asia & Oceania
List of Miss Supranational Participant from 2014–2021, List of Miss Supranational Participant from 2022–present

=== Miss Intercontinental Korea ===
Miss Korea
Year	Residence	Representative	Korean Name	National Title	Placement at MIC	Special Awards
1977	Jeju Island	Chung Mi-hee	정미희	6th Runner-up of 1977	Unplaced	
1978	Seoul	Park Kyoung-ae	박경애	1st Runner-up of 1978	Unplaced	
List of Miss Intercontinental Participant from 2006–2008
2009	Jeonbuk	Cha Ye-rin	차예린	1st Runner-up of 2009	Top 15	1 Special Awards: Asia & Oceania
2010	Seoul	Jang Yoon-jin	장윤진	1st Runner-up of 2010	Unplaced	
List of Miss Intercontinental Participant from 2011–present

=== Miss Asia Pacific International Korea ===
Miss Korea
Year	Residence	Representative	Korean Name	National Title	Placement at MAP	Special Awards
1968	Seoul	Chang Hye-sun	장혜선	5th Runner-up of 1968	Unplaced	
1969	Seoul	Seo Won-Kyoung	서원경	4th Runner-up of 1969	Miss Asia Quest	
1970	Did not compete in 1970					
1971	Seoul	Hong Shin-hee	홍신희	3rd Runner-up of 1971	2nd Runner-up	
1972	Busan	Shin Gah-jung	신가정	2nd Runner-up of 1972	Unplaced	
1973	Jeonbuk	Chung Keum-ok	정금옥	4th Runner-up of 1972	3rd Runner-up	2 Special Awards: Best National Costume; Miss Talent
1974	Did not compete in 1974					
1975	Seoul	Kim Tae-hee	김태희	3rd Runner-up of 1974	Unplaced	1 Special Awards: Best National Costume
1976	Seoul	Jin-Sook	진숙	5th Runner-up of 1975	Unplaced	1 Special Awards: Miss Photogenic
1977	Seoul	Chung Kyoung-sook	정경숙	Miss Korea 1976	Unplaced	2 Special Awards: Best National Costume; Miss Photogenic
1978	Seoul	Kim Young-sun	김영선	3rd Runner-up of 1977	Unplaced	
1979	Seoul	Park Sook-jae	박숙재	4th Runner-up of 1978	Unplaced	
1980	Chungbuk	Lee Joo-yeon	이주연	4th Runner-up of 1979	Unplaced	
1981	Seoul	Kang Min-jung	강민정	3rd Runner-up of 1980	3rd Runner-up	1 Special Awards: Best National Costume
1982	Gyeonggi	Kim Mi-sun	김미선	4th Runner-up of 1982	4th Runner-up	1 Special Awards: Miss Talent
1983	Did not compete in 1983					
1984	Seoul	Oh Sook-hee	오숙희	4th Runner-up of 1983	Unplaced	
1985	Jeonbuk	Lim Ji-yeon	임지연	4th Runner-up of 1984	1st Runner-up	1 Special Awards: Best Evening Gown
1986	Seoul	Seo Hyun-kyoung	서현경	5th Runner-up of 1985	Top 16	
1987	Daegu	Choi Eun-hee	최은희	4th Runner-up of 1985	3rd Runner-up	1 Special Awards: Miss Photogenic
1988	Seoul	Kim Mi-rim	김미림	2nd Runner-up of 1987	4th Runner-up	
1989	Daegu	Chae Wha-jung	채화정	3rd Runner-up of 1988	Unplaced	
1990	California	Shin Soh-young	신소영	3rd Runner-up of 1989	Pageant not held between 1990 and 1991	
1992	Did not compete in 1992					
1993	Daegu	Seo Yeon-jung	서연정	3rd Runner-up of 1992	Unplaced	1 Special Awards: Best National Costume
1994	Seoul	Chang Mi-ho	장미호	6th Runner-up of 1993	Top 12	1 Special Awards: Best National Costume
1995	Gyeongbuk	Yoon Mi-jung	윤미정	1st Runner-up of 1994	Miss Asia Pacific	
1996	Busan	Lee Ji-hee	이지희	2nd Runner-up of 1996	Top 10	1 Special Awards: Best Evening Gown
1997	Daegu	Yeo Hye-jeon	여혜전	2nd Runner-up of 1997	Unplaced	1 Special Awards: Miss Ponds Beautiful Skin
1998	Chungbuk	Yang So-hyun	양소현	2nd Runner-up of 1998	Unplaced	
1999	Seoul	Kim Hyo-joo	김효주	2nd Runner-up of 1999	Unplaced	
2000	Seoul	Chang Eun-jin	장은진	3rd Runner-up of 2000	Unplaced	1 Special Awards: Best National Costume
2001	Seoul	Kim Ji-hye	김지혜	4th Runner-up of 2001	Top 10	1 Special Awards: Miss Talent
2002	Daejeon	Kim So-yoon	김소윤	4th Runner-up of 2002	Miss Asia Pacific	3 Special Awards: Miss Ponds; Miss Congeniality; Miss Photogenic
2003	Busan	Ahn Choon-young	안춘영	2nd Runner-up of 2003	Unplaced	1 Special Awards: Best National Costume
2004	Pageant not held in 2004					
2005	Seoul	Choi Young-ah	최영아	4th Runner-up of 2004	Unplaced	
2006	Seoul	Kim Eun-ji	김은지	2nd Runner-up of 2005	Pageant not held	
2007	Seoul	Kim Yoo-mi	김유미	2nd Runner-up of 2006	Pageant not held	
List of Miss Asia Pacific International Participant from 2016–present

=== Miss Asia Korea ===
Miss Korea
Year	Residence	Representative	Korean Name	National Title	Placement at MA	Special Awards
1963	Seoul	Choi In-ja	최인자	5th Runner-up of 1962	Miss Asia	

=== Miss Tourism Queen of the Year International Korea ===
Miss Korea
Year	Residence	Representative	Korean Name	National Title	Placement at MTQY	Special Awards
2010	Seoul	Ha Hyun-jung	하현정	2nd Runner-up of 2010	Miss Tourism Queen of the Year International	1 Special Awards: Miss Charm
2011	Seoul	Gong Pyung-hee	공평희	2nd Runner-up of 2011	4th Runner-up	1 Special Awards: Special Award
2012	Incheon	Kim Young-joo	김영주	2nd Runner-up of 2012	1st Runner-up	1 Special Awards: Miss Tourism Ambassador

=== Miss Young International Korea ===
Miss Korea
Year	Residence	Representative	Korean Name	National Title	Placement at MY	Special Awards
1970	Seoul	Yoo Jae-soon	유재순	Hankook Ilbo pageant	Unplaced	
1971	Seoul	Cha Soon-young	차순영	2nd Runner-up of 1971	Unplaced	
1972	Jeonbuk	Chung Keum-ok	정금옥	4th Runner-up of 1972	Unplaced	
1973	Gyeongbuk	Kim Jun-kyung	김준경	2nd Runner-up of 1973	Unplaced	
1974	Seoul	Kim Kyung-ok	김경옥	1st Runner-up of 1974	Unplaced	
1975	Seoul	Lee Yeon-ok	이연옥	1st Runner-up of 1975	Unplaced	
1976	Seoul	Lee Hye-kyung	이혜경	1st Runner-up of 1976	Unplaced	1 Special Awards: Miss Photogenic
1977	Seoul	Lee Jung-hwa	이정화	1st Runner-up of 1977	Top 12	
1978	California	Kim Eun-hee	김은희	2nd Runner-up of 1978	Unplaced	
1979	Seoul	Kim Mi-ho	김미호	3rd Runner-up of 1979	Unplaced	
1980	Seoul	Kim Hye-ran	김혜란	2nd Runner-up of 1980	Unplaced	
1981	Jeonbuk	Kim So-hyung	김소형	1st Runner-up of 1981	Unplaced	1 Special Awards: Best National Costume
1982	Pageant not held in 1982					
1983	Daegu	Kim Sun-mi	김선미	1st Runner-up of 1983	2nd Runner-up	
1984	The international pageant was officially scrapped in 1984.					

=== Queen of the Pacific Korea ===
Miss Korea
Year	Residence	Representative	Korean Name	National Title	Placement at QP	Special Awards
1970	Seoul	Lim Jung-eun	임정은	3rd Runner-up of 1969	Unplaced	
1971	Seoul	Kim Kyoung-soon	김경순	4th Runner-up of 1970	Unplaced	
1972	Japan	Cho Ae-ja	조애자	5th Runner-up of 1971	Unplaced	
1973	Seoul	Oh Young-eun	오영은	5th Runner-up of 1972	2nd Runner-up	
1974	Seoul	Lee Tae-hyun	이태현	4th Runner-up of 1973	Unplaced	
1975	Seoul	Lee Hee-young	이희영	4th Runner-up of 1974	Unplaced	
1976	Japan	Noh Duck-ja	노덕자	2nd Runner-up of 1975	1st Runner-up	1 Special Awards: Miss Crowning Glory
1977	Gyeonggi	Cha Jang-ok	차장옥	2nd Runner-up of 1976	Unplaced	
1978	Pageant not held in 1978					

=== Miss Wonderland Korea ===
Miss Korea
Year	Residence	Representative	Korean Name	National Title	Placement at MW	Special Awards
1987	Seoul	Oh Soo-kyoung	오수경	4th Runner-up of 1986	Top 15	1 Special Awards: Best National Costume
1988	Seoul	Lee Hye-jung	이혜정	5th Runner-up of 1986	Unplaced	1 Special Awards: Best National Costume
1989	Gangwon	Choo Young-mi	추영미	5th Runner-up of 1988	Top 10	1 Special Awards: Miss Photogenic

=== Miss International Pacific Pearl Korea ===
Miss Korea
Year	Residence	Representative	Korean Name	National Title	Placement at MIP	Special Awards
1987	Seoul	Chang Hye-young	장혜영	5th Runner-up of 1987	Unplaced	1 Special Awards: Best National Costume

=== Miss Flower Queen Korea ===
Miss Korea
Year	Residence	Representative	Korean Name	National Title	Placement at MFQ	Special Awards
1990	Gyeongbuk	Cho Ae-sun	조애선	5th Runner-up of 1989	Unplaced	

=== Miss All Nations Korea ===
Miss Korea
Year	Residence	Representative	Korean Name	National Title	Placement at MAN	Special Awards
1990	Gyeonggi	Kim Mi-jin	김미진	6th Runner-up of 1989	Unplaced	

=== Miss International Blueberry Korea ===
Miss Korea
Year	Residence	Representative	Korean Name	National Title	Placement at MIB	Special Awards
2012	Gyeongbuk	Kim Tae-Hyeon	김태현	2nd Runner-up of 2012	TOP 10	1 Special Awards: Loving Heart Award

=== Miss International Beauty Korea ===
Miss Korea
Year	Residence	Representative	Korean Name	National Title	Placement at MIB	Special Awards
2009	Gwangju	Lee Yoon-ah	이윤아	2nd Runner-up of 2008	Top 15	2 Special Awards: Internet Popularity; Miss Charm

== Titleholders ==
Year	Mister World Korea	Runners-Up		Special Awards	Location	Final Entrants
Year	Mister World Korea	First	Second	Special Awards	Location	Final Entrants
2009	Yoo Ji-kwang	Park Hyun-woo	Choi Jae-woong	Kim Hyun-jong, Shim Gyu-gong	Incheon	20

=== Mister World Korea ===
In 2009, Hankook Ilbo sent first Mister World contestant who is represent Korea.

Hankook Ilbo
Year	Residence	Representative	Korean Name	National Title	Placement at MW	Special Awards
2010	Seoul	Yoo Ji-kwang .	유지광	Mister World Korea 2009	Top 15 (7th Place)	2 Special Awards: Talent & Creativity; Top 20 - Top Model
List of Mister World Participant from 2014–present

=== Manhunt International Korea ===
Hankook Ilbo
Year	Residence	Representative	Korean Name	National Title	Placement at MH	Special Awards
2010	Seoul	Park Hyun Woo	박현우	Mister World Korea 2009 (1st r-up)	Unplaced	2 Special Awards: Mr. Friendship; Dress Popularity Award
List of Manhunt International Participant

== Notes ==
=== Miss Korea Sisters ===
- Sohn Mi-hee-ja (Winner of 1960) (Miss Universe 1960 - Top 15)
  Sohn Yang-ja (1st Runner-up of 1962) (Miss International 1962)
- Shin Byoung-sook (2nd Runner-up of 1976) (Miss World 1976)
  Shin Byoung-ok (2nd Runner-up of 1977) (Miss International 1977)
- Choi Young-ok (Winner of 1984) (Miss Universe 1985)
  Choi Yeon-hee (1st Runner-up of 1987) (Miss World 1988 - 1st r-up)
- Jang Hye-young (5th Runner-up of 1987)
  (Miss International Pacific Pearl 1987 - Best National Costume)
  Jang Eun-young (1st Runner-up of 1992)
  (Miss International 1993 - Top 15)
- Kim Hee-jung (2nd Runner-up of 1988)
  (Miss International 1989 - Top 15)
  Kim Min-jung (2nd Runner-up of 1995)
  Kim Yeon-su (6th Runner-up of 2002)
- Seol Soo-jin (1st Runner-up of 1996) (Miss World 1996)
  Seol Soo-hyun (2nd Runner-up of 1999)
- Son Hye-im (6th Runner-up of 1999)
  Son Tae-young (2nd Runner-up of 2000)
  (Miss International 2000 - 1st Runner-up)
- Yu Si-eun (1st Runner-up of 2022)
  Yu Eun-seo (2nd Runner-up of 2025)

=== Etc. ===
- Yoo Ha-young (Winner of 1992) (Miss Universe 1993) (Cousin)
  Han Kyoung-jin (1st Runner-up of 2004) (Miss World 2004)
- Jang Yoon-jeong (Winner of 1987) (Miss Universe 1988 - 1st r-up)
  Jang Jee-hun (World Miss University 1997 - Winner) (Sister)
- Kwon Jung-joo (4th Runner-up of 1990) (Mother)
  (Miss International 1991 - Top 15)
  Jisu Kim (Miss Universe 2021) (Daughter)

== See also ==
- Miss Queen Korea
- Miss Grand Korea
- Mister World Korea
- Mister International Korea
- Mister Korea
- Miss Earth Korea
- Miss International Korea
- Miss Universe Korea Representative
- Miss and Mister Korea beauty pageants
- Miss and Mister World Korea
- Miss and Mister Supranational Korea
- List of beauty pageants

Preceded by Miss Korea (Hankook Ilbo); 1954–2015	Miss Universe franchise holder of Korea	Succeeded by Miss Universe Korea (PJP); 2016–present

Preceded by Miss Korea (Hankook Ilbo); 1959–2010	Miss World franchise holder of Korea	Succeeded by Miss World Korea (PJP); 2011–present

Preceded by Miss Korea (Hankook Ilbo); 1960–2024	Miss International franchise holder of Korea	Succeeded by Miss International Korea (KBO); 2025–present

Preceded by Miss Korea (Hankook Ilbo); 2002–2024	Miss Earth franchise holder of Korea	Succeeded by Miss Earth Korea (SY Personal Brand & Academy); 2025–present

Preceded by Miss Korea (Hankook Ilbo); 2010	Miss Supranational franchise holder of Korea	Succeeded by Miss Supranational Korea (PJP); 2014–2021
