= Miss Supranational 2018 =

10th Miss Supranational competition, beauty pageant edition

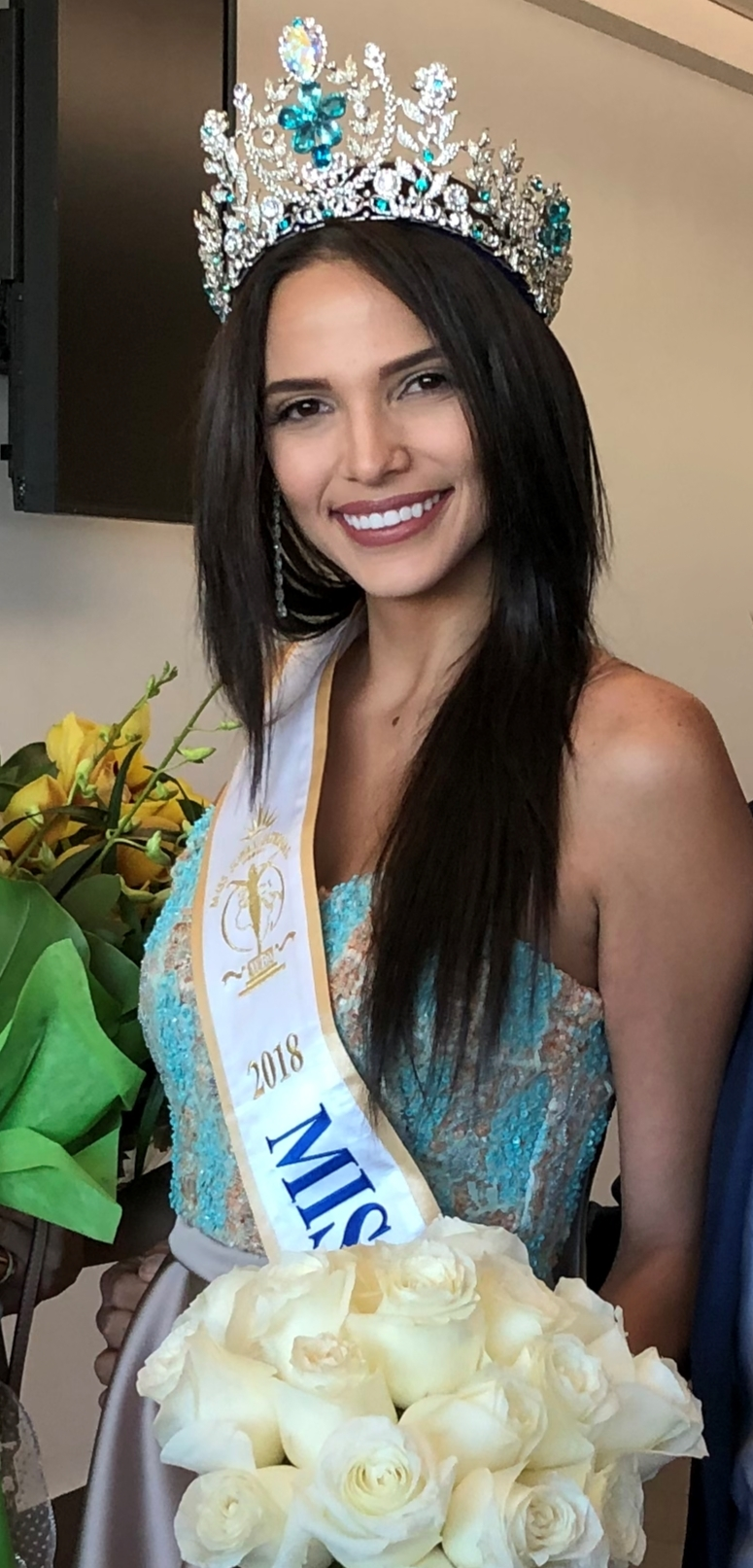
- Valeria Vázquez, Miss Supranational 2018
- Date: December 7, 2018
- Presenters: Maciej Dowbor; Iwan Podriez
- Theme: Glamour, Fashion and Natural Beauty
- Venue: Hala MOSiR Arena, Krynica-Zdrój, Poland
- Broadcaster: Polsat; Fox Life
- Entrants: 72
- Placements: 25
- Debuts: Laos; Pakistan
- Withdrawals: Angola; Cape Verde; Chile; Ethiopia; Germany; Gibraltar; Kazakhstan; Norway; Peru; São Tomé and Príncipe; Scotland; South Sudan; Wales; Zimbabwe
- Returns: Argentina; Denmark; England; Equatorial Guinea; Greece; Guatemala; Haiti; Hungary; Italy; Lebanon; Malaysia; Mauritius; Moldova; Montenegro; Nepal; New Zealand; Nigeria; Slovenia; Sweden; Togo; Ukraine
- Winner: Valeria Vázquez; Puerto Rico
- Congeniality: Priyanka Annuncia (Singapore)
- Photogenic: Nariman Battikha (Venezuela)

Miss Supranational 2018 was the tenth Miss Supranational pageant, held at the MOSIR Arena in Krynica-Zdrój, Poland, on December 7, 2018.

Jenny Kim of South Korea crowned Valeria Vázquez of Puerto Rico as her successor at the end of the event.

== Background ==
On August 17, 2018 the organization of Miss Supranational is delighted to announce that the 10th Anniversary edition of the finals of Miss Supranational 2018 would be held on Friday 7 December at MOSIR Arena in the beautiful mountain resort of Krynica-Zdrój in Poland.

== Results ==
=== Placements ===
| Placement | Contestant |
|---|---|
| Miss Supranational 2018 | Puerto Rico – Valeria Vázquez |
| 1st Runner-Up | United States – Katrina Dimaranan |
| 2nd Runner-Up | Poland – Magdalena Bieńkowska |
| 3rd Runner-Up | Indonesia – Wilda Octaviana Situngkir |
| 4th Runner-Up | Mexico – Diana Romero Ortega |
| Top 10 | Brazil – Bárbara Reis; Philippines – Jehza Mae Huelar; Romania – Andreea Coman; Venezuela – Nariman Battikha; Vietnam – Nguyễn Minh Tú |
| Top 25 | Australia – Maddison-Clare Sloane; Belarus – Margarita Martynova; Colombia – Miriam Carranza; Denmark – Celina Riel; Equatorial Guinea – María Maleva; India – Aditi Hundia; Malaysia – Sanjna Suri; Mauritius – Anoushka Ah Keng; Myanmar – Shwe Eain Si; Netherlands – Kelly van den Dungen; Nigeria – Daniella Orumwense; Pakistan – Anzhelika Tahir; Russia – Guzaliya Izmailova; Slovakia – Katarína Oeovanová; Ukraine – Snizhana Tanchuk |

=== Continental Queens of Beauty ===
| Continent | Contestant |
|---|---|
| Africa | Mauritius – Anoushka Ah Keng |
| Americas | Brazil – Bárbara Reis |
| Asia | Vietnam – Nguyễn Minh Tú |
| Caribbean | Suriname – Shamira Nadine Jap |
| Europe | Romania – Andreea Coman |
| Oceania | Australia – Maddison-Clare Sloane |

== Judges ==
On the occasion 10th anniversary of the competition, all winners were originally Judges. However, for personal reasons, Monika Lewczuk - Miss Supranational 2011 and Stephania Vásquez Stegman - Miss Supranational 2015 can't attend.

- Gerhard Parzutka von Lipinski – President of the Miss Supranational Organization
- Oksana Moria – Miss Supranational 2009
- Karina Pinilla Corro – Miss Supranational 2010
- Katarzyna Krzeszowska – 4th Runner-up Miss Supranational 2014
- Ekaterina Buraya – Miss Supranational 2012
- Mutya Johanna Datul – Miss Supranational 2013
- Asha Bhat – Miss Supranational 2014
- Srinidhi Ramesh Shetty – Miss Supranational 2016
- Jenny Kim – Miss Supranational 2017

== Special awards ==
| Results | Contestant |
|---|---|
| Best National Costume | Guatemala – Stephanie Ogaldez; Haiti – Mideline Phelizor; Indonesia – Wilda Octaviana; Laos – Santhany Saimanyvan; Mexico – Diana Romero Ortega; Panama – Keythlin Saavedra; Russia – Guzaliya Izmailova; South Korea – Lee Eun-bi; Vietnam – Nguyễn Minh Tú |
| Best in Evening Gown | Vietnam – Nguyễn Minh Tú |
| Best Body | United States – Katrina Dimaranan |
| Miss Congeniality | Singapore – Priyanka Annuncia |
| Miss Photogenic | Venezuela – Nariman Battikha |
| Miss Talent | South Korea – Lee Eun-bi |
| Miss Elegance | Belgium – Dhenia Covens |
| Supra Model of the Year | Brazil – Bárbara Reis |

=== Top Model ===
| Results | Contestant |
|---|---|
| Supra Next Top Model | Brazil – Bárbara Reis |
| Top Model Asia | Indonesia – Wilda Octaviana |
| Top Model Oceania | Australia – Maddison-Clare Sloane |
| Top Model Africa | Equatorial Guinea – María Lucrecia Nve Maleva |
| Top Model Europe | Belarus – Margarita Martynova |
| Top Model Americas | Brazil – Bárbara Reis |
| Top Model Caribbean | Haiti – Mideline Phelizor |

== Contestants ==
72 contestants competed for the title.

| Country/Territory | Contestant | Age | Hometown | Continental Group |
|---|---|---|---|---|
| Albania | Alba Bajram | 18 | Elbasan | Europe |
| Argentina | Lali Dieguez | 19 | Buenos Aires | Americas |
| Australia | Maddison-Clare Sloane | 25 | Sydney | Oceania |
| Belarus | Margarita Martynova | 22 | Minsk | Europe |
| Belgium | Dhenia Covens | 25 | Antwerp | Europe |
| Bolivia | Ilseen Olmos | 27 | La Paz | Americas |
| Brazil | Bárbara Reis | 20 | Sinop | Americas |
| Canada | Alyssa Boston | 23 | Tecumseh | Americas |
| China | Gao Ziqian | 19 | Beijing | Asia |
| Colombia | Miriam Carranza | 23 | Barranquilla | Americas |
| Costa Rica | Marianella Chase | 27 | San José | Americas |
| Croatia | Tihana Babij Guliing | 18 | Zagrzeb | Europe |
| Czech Republic | Jana Šišková | 23 | Zubří | Europe |
| Denmark | Celina Riel | 18 | Copenhagen | Europe |
| Dominican Republic | Yomaira de Luna | 22 | Toledo | Caribbean |
| Ecuador | Carla del Prado | 24 | Guayaquil | Americas |
| El Salvador | Katia Mekhi Lobos | 28 | San Salvador | Americas |
| England | Romy Simpkins | 24 | London | Europe |
| Equatorial Guinea | María Lucrecia Nve Maleva | 19 | Malabo | Africa |
| Finland | Eveliina Tikka | 23 | Helsinki | Europe |
| France | Sonia Aït Mansour | 25 | Paris | Europe |
| Greece | Maria Psilou | 21 | Aigio | Europe |
| Guadeloupe | Daveline Nanette | 27 | Basse-Terre | Caribbean |
| Guatemala | Stephanie Ogaldez | 21 | Guatemala City | Americas |
| Haiti | Mideline Phelizor | 23 | Port-au-Prince | Caribbean |
| Hungary | Patrícia Galambos | 21 | Budapest | Europe |
| India | Aditi Hundia | 21 | Jaipur | Asia |
| Indonesia | Wilda Octaviana Situngkir | 22 | Pontianak | Asia |
| Italy | Rosa Fariello | 23 | Apulia | Europe |
| Jamaica | Tonille Simone Watkis | 27 | Kingston | Caribbean |
| Japan | Yurika Nakamoto | 23 | Okinawa | Asia |
| Kenya | Ivy Marani | 24 | Bungoma | Africa |
| Laos | Santhany Saimanyvan | 25 | Vientiane | Asia |
| Lebanon | Natalie Macdisi | 24 | Tripoli | Asia |
| Malaysia | Sanjna Suri | 27 | Batu Caves | Asia |
| Malta | Natalia Galea | 20 | Birkirkara | Europe |
| Mauritius | Anoushka Ah Keng | 24 | Rodrigues | Africa |
| Mexico | Diana Romero Ortega | 26 | Mazatlán | Americas |
| Moldova | Nicoleta Căun | 22 | Chișinău | Europe |
| Montenegro | Sandra Rešetar | 22 | Podgorica | Europe |
| Myanmar | Shwe Eain Si | 20 | Naypyitaw | Asia |
| Namibia | Ndilyowike Haipinge | 26 | Windhoek | Africa |
| Nepal | Mahima Singh | 23 | Kathmandu | Asia |
| Netherlands | Kelly van den Dungen | 25 | Amsterdam | Europe |
| New Zealand | Johannah Charlotte Prasad | 25 | Wellington | Oceania |
| Nigeria | Daniella Orumwense | 25 | Edo | Africa |
| Pakistan | Anzhelika Tahir | 24 | Karachi | Asia |
| Panama | Keythlin Saavedra | 18 | Panama City | Americas |
| Paraguay | Ana Paula Cespedes | 20 | Asunción | Americas |
| Philippines | Jehza Mae Huelar | 23 | Davao City | Asia |
| Poland | Magdalena Bieńkowska | 25 | Warsaw | Europe |
| Portugal | Cláudia Maia | 21 | Lamas | Europe |
| Puerto Rico | Valeria Vázquez | 24 | San Juan | Caribbean |
| Romania | Andreea Coman | 25 | Bucharest | Europe |
| Russia | Guzaliya Izmailova | 22 | Saint Petersburg | Europe |
| Rwanda | Tina Uwase Ngaceng | 24 | Kigali | Africa |
| Singapore | Priyanka Annuncia | 21 | Singapore | Asia |
| Slovakia | Katarína Oeovanová | 21 | Hriňová | Europe |
| Slovenia | Mersedes Viler Zdzarsky | 27 | Ljubljana | Europe |
| South Africa | Belindé Schreuder | 22 | Johannesburg | Africa |
| South Korea | Lee Eun-bi | 26 | Gyeonggi | Asia |
| Spain | Teresa Calleja Palazuelo | 21 | Madrid | Europe |
| Suriname | Shamira Nadine Jap | 22 | Paramaribo | Caribbean |
| Sweden | Jenny Wulff | 22 | Stockholm | Europe |
| Switzerland | Amelia Giannarelli | 20 | Collombey-Muraz | Europe |
| Thailand | Pinnarat Mawinthon | 27 | Nan | Asia |
| Togo | Yasmin Iman Salou | 25 | Lomé | Africa |
| Turkey | Roda Irmak Kalkan | 18 | Istanbul | Europe |
| Ukraine | Snizhana Tanchuk | 27 | Lviv | Europe |
| United States | Katrina Dimaranan | 25 | Union City | Americas |
| Venezuela | Nariman Battikha | 24 | Maturín | Americas |
| Vietnam | Nguyễn Minh Tú | 27 | Ho Chi Minh City | Asia |

== Notes ==
=== Debuts ===
- Laos
- Pakistan

=== Returns ===
Last competed in 2012:

- Montenegro

Last competed in 2013:

- Guatemala
- Moldova
- Togo

Last competed in 2014:

- Greece
- Lebanon
- Slovakia

Last competed in 2015:

- Equatorial Guinea
- New Zealand

Last competed in 2016:

- Argentina
- Denmark
- England
- Italy
- Haiti
- Hungary
- Malaysia
- Mauritius
- Nepal
- Nigeria
- Sweden
- Ukraine

=== Withdrawals ===
- Angola
- Cape Verde
- Chile
- Germany
- Gibraltar
- Kazakhstan
- Norway
- Peru
- São Tomé and Príncipe
- Scotland
- South Sudan
- Wales
- Zimbabwe
