= Miss Supranational 2017 =

9th Miss Supranational competition, beauty pageant edition

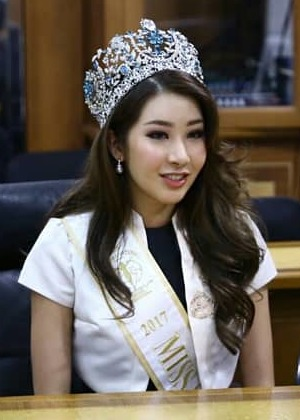
- Miss Supranational 2017, Jenny Kim at the Ministry of Tourism and Creative Economy of The Republic of Indonesia and Puteri Indonesia Pariwisata Press Conference.
- Date: December 1, 2017
- Presenters: Davina Reeves; Iwan Podriez
- Theme: Glamour, Fashion and Natural Beauty
- Venue: Hala MOSiR Arena, Krynica-Zdrój, Poland
- Broadcaster: Polsat
- Entrants: 65
- Placements: 25
- Debuts: South Sudan
- Withdrawals: Argentina; Denmark; Egypt; England; Guyana; Haiti; Hungary; Kosovo; Macau; Malaysia; Mauritius; Mongolia; Nepal; Nigeria; Sri Lanka; Sweden; Trinidad and Tobago; Ukraine
- Returns: Cape Verde; Dominican Republic; Finland; Italy; Kazakhstan; Kenya; Namibia; Norway; São Tomé and Príncipe; Serbia; Zimbabwe
- Winner: Jenny Kim; South Korea
- Congeniality: Chanel Thomas (Philippines)
- Best National Costume: Karol Batista (Panama)
- Photogenic: Katherine López (Ecuador)

Miss Supranational 2017 was the ninth Miss Supranational pageant, held at the MOSIR Arena in Krynica-Zdrój, Poland, on December 1, 2017.

Srinidhi Shetty of India crowned Jenny Kim of South Korea as her successor at the end of the event.

== Background ==
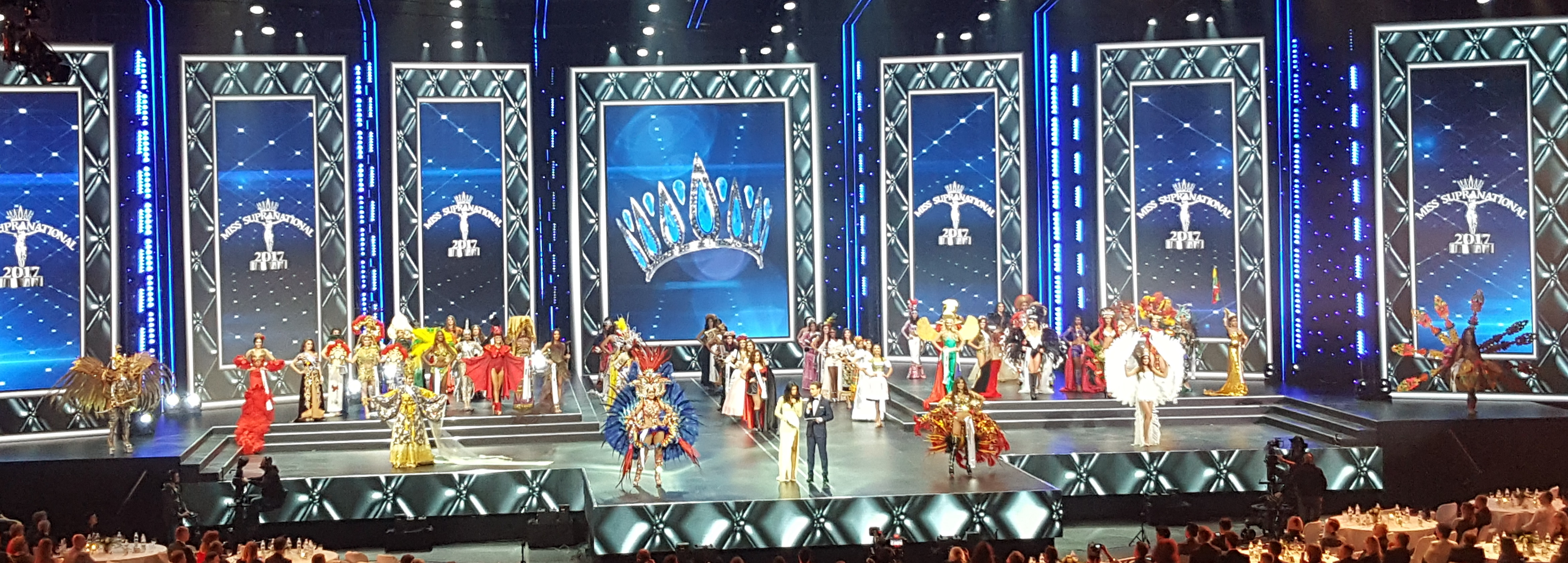
Miss Supranational 2017 stage.

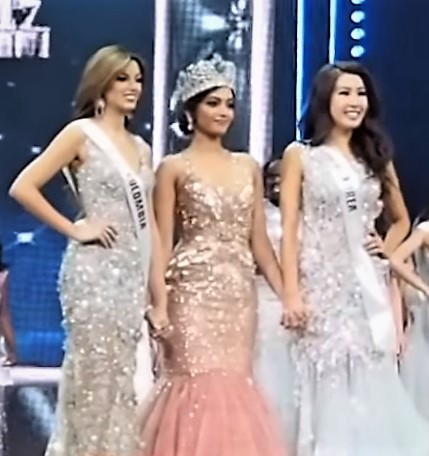
The finals of Miss Supranational 2017. Left to right: Tica Martinez of Colombia, first runner-up; Srinidhi Shetty, reigning Miss Supranational 2016; Jenny Kim of South Korea, Miss Supranational 2017.

On July 27, 2017, the organization of Miss Supranational announced that the pageant will be held in two countries, Poland and Slovakia. The finals of Miss Supranational 2017 would be held on Friday 1 December at MOSIR Arena in the mountain resort of Krynica-Zdrój in Poland again.

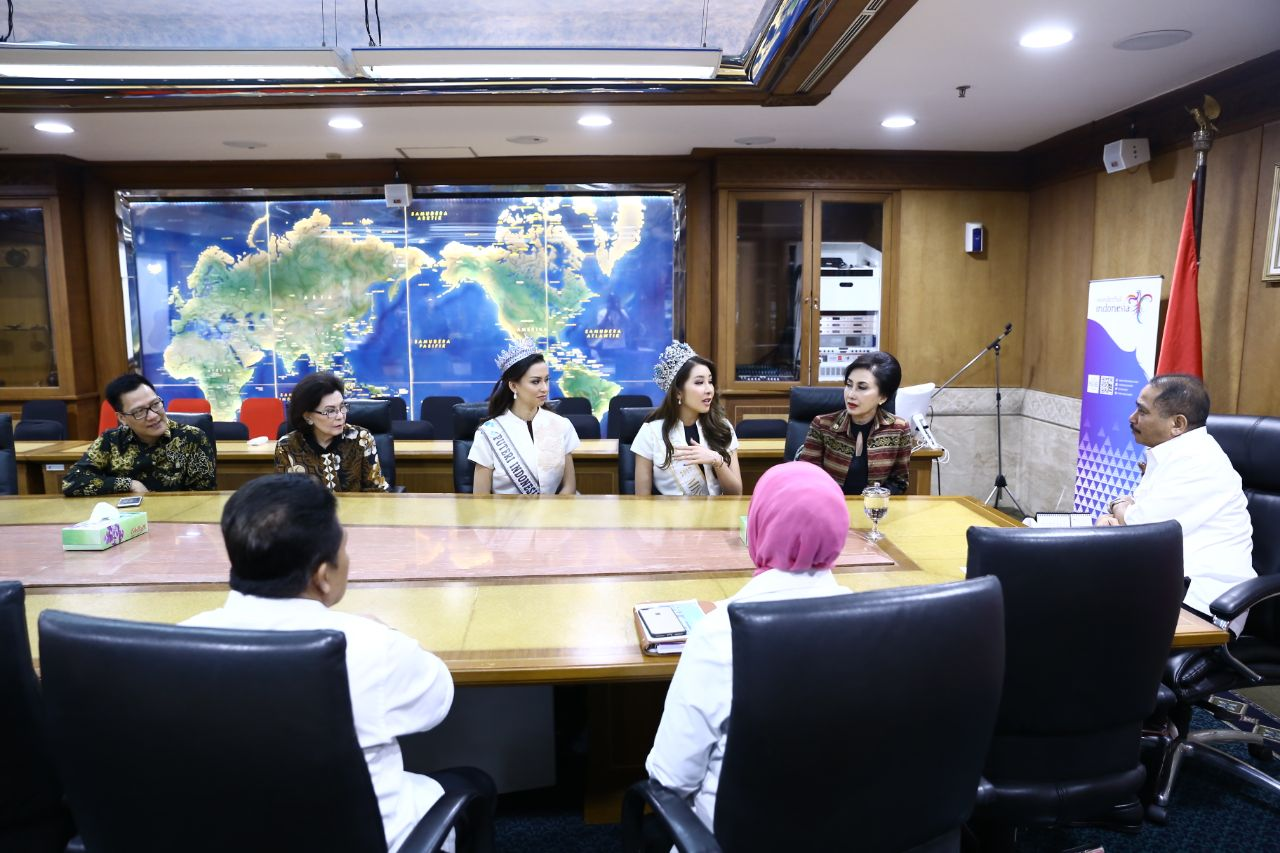
Jenny Kim together with Puteri Indonesia Pariwisata 2017 (Miss Supranational Indonesia 2017) - Karina Nadila Niab at the Ministry of Tourism and Creative Economy of The Republic of Indonesia and Puteri Indonesia Organization Press Conference.

== Results ==
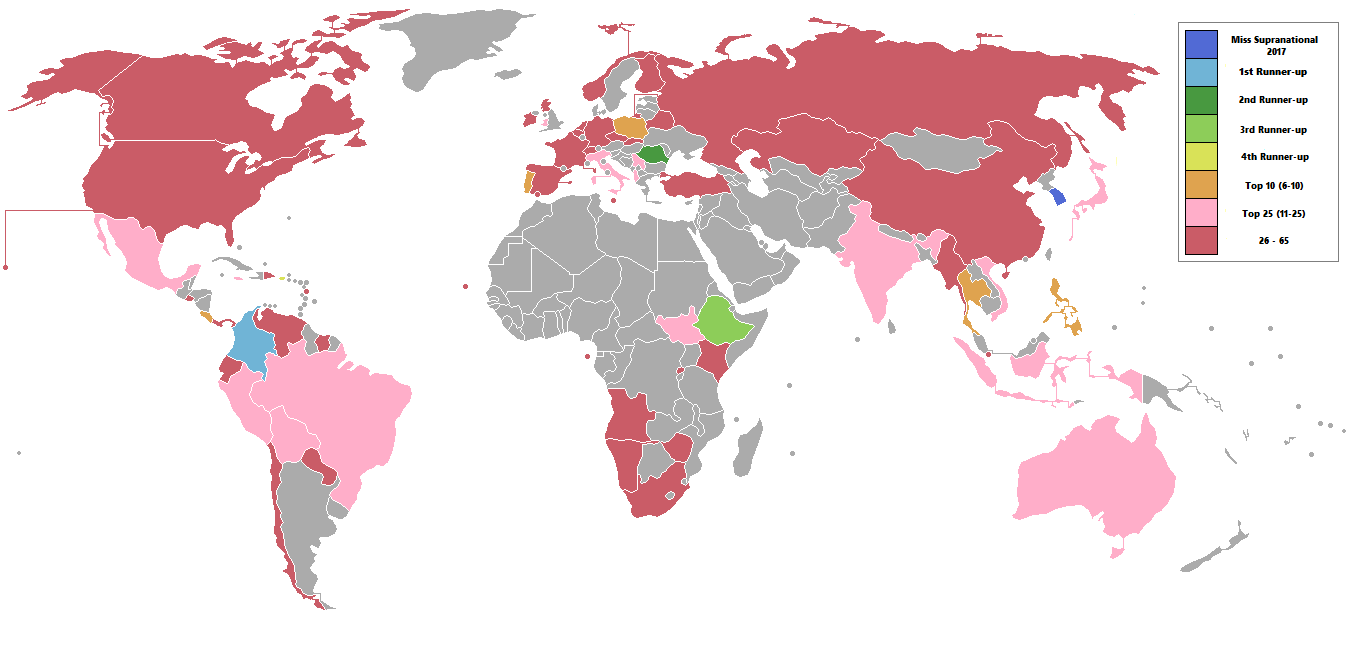
Countries and territories which sent delegates and results for Miss Supranational 2017

=== Placements ===
Placement	Contestant
Miss Supranational 2017	South Korea – Jenny Kim
1st Runner-Up	Colombia – Tica Martínez
2nd Runner-Up	Romania – Bianca Tirsin
3rd Runner-Up	Ethiopia – Bitaniya Josef
4th Runner-Up	Puerto Rico – Larissa Santiago
Top 10	Costa Rica – Nicole Menayo; Philippines – Chanel Olive Thomas; Poland – Paulina Maziarz; Portugal – Priscila Alves; Thailand – Jiraprapa Boonnuang
Top 25	Albania – Alessia Çoku; Australia – Alecia McCallum; Bolivia – Romina Rocamonje; Brazil – Thayná Lima; India – Peden Ongmu Namgyal; Indonesia – Karina Nadila Niab §; Italy – Barbara Storoni; Jamaica – Nicole Stoddart; Japan – Yuki Koshikawa; Mexico – Samantha Leyva; Peru – Lesly Reyna; Serbia – Bojana Bojanić; South Sudan – Anyier Deng Yuol; Vietnam – Nguyễn Đình Khánh Phương ∆; Wales – Rachel Tate

§ – Vodi Fan Vote Winner which automatically advanced to the Top 25
∆ – Facebook Winner which automatically advanced to Top 25

=== Continental Queens of Beauty ===
Continent	Contestant
Africa	South Sudan – Anyier Deng Yuol
Americas	Costa Rica – Nicole Menayo
Asia and Oceania	Thailand – Jiraprapa Boonnuang
Europe	Poland – Paulina Maziarz

== Special awards ==
Results	Contestant
Best National Costume	Panama - Karol Dayana Batista
Best in Evening Gown	Venezuela - Geraldine Duque
Best in Swimsuit	Indonesia - Karina Nadila Niab
Best Body	Namibia - Meriam Kaxuxwena
Miss Congeniality	Philippines - Chanel Olive Thomas
Miss Photogenic	Ecuador - Katherine López España
Miss Talent	Portugal - Priscila Alves
Miss Elegance	Spain - Beatriz Balseiro Cendán
Top Model	Albania - Alessia Çoku
Vodi Fan Vote	Indonesia - Karina Nadila Niab
Miss Semilac	Poland - Paulina Maziarz

== Contestants ==
65 contestants competed for the title.

Country/Territory	Contestant	Age	Hometown	Continental Group
Albania	Alessia Çoku	18	Tirana	Europe
Angola	Janice Quessongo	27	Luanda	Africa
Australia	Alecia McCallum	21	Cessnock	Oceania
Belarus	Olga Gribovskaya	23	Minsk	Europe
Belgium	Kim Detollenaere	25	Louvain-la-Neuve	Europe
Bolivia	Romina Rocamonje	25	Guayaramerín	Americas
Brazil	Thayná Lima	21	Brasília	Americas
Canada	Karema Batotele	21	Ottawa	Americas
Cape Verde	Prissy Gomes	24	Praia	Africa
Chile	Constanza Schmith	20	Quillota	Americas
China	Danna Liao	19	Beijing	Asia
Colombia	Tica Martínez	20	Sabanalarga	Americas
Costa Rica	Nicole Menayo	23	Heredia	Americas
Croatia	Eni Šukunda	27	Zagrzeb	Europe
Czech Republic	Tereza Vlčková	24	Zlín	Europe
Dominican Republic	Lia Rossis	19	Peravia	Caribbean
Ecuador	Katty López España	24	Pedernales	Americas
El Salvador	Pia Trigueros	24	San Salvador	Americas
Ethiopia	Bitaniya Josef	24	Addis Ababa	Africa
Finland	Erika Helin	23	Helsinki	Europe
France	Deborah Jacquin-Gottfried	25	Wittelsheim	Europe
Germany	Mona Schafnitzl	22	Berlin	Europe
Gibraltar	Sian Dean	20	Gibraltar	Europe
Guadeloupe	Lorina Victoria Moderne	22	Basse-Terre	Caribbean
India	Peden Ongmu Namgyal	22	Gangtok	Asia
Indonesia	Karina Nadila Niab	24	Padang	Asia
Italy	Barbara Storoni	26	Conegliano	Europe
Jamaica	Nicole Stoddart	28	Montego Bay	Caribbean
Japan	Yuki Koshikawa	20	Chiba	Asia
Kazakhstan	Bota Kanza	28	Astana	Asia
Kenya	Ivy Mido	21	Nairobi	Africa
Malta	Anthea Zammit	23	Żebbuġ	Europe
Mexico	Samantha Leyva	25	Guerrero	Americas
Myanmar	Shwe Hmuu Han	19	Naypyidaw	Asia
Namibia	Meriam Kaxuxwena	25	Engela	Africa
Netherlands	Shanna Boeff	19	Leiderdorp	Europe
Norway	Yasmin Osee Aakre	28	Oslo	Europe
Panama	Karol Dayana Batista	25	Los Santos	Americas
Paraguay	Azul Santacruz	18	Eusebio Ayala	Americas
Peru	Lesly Reyna	23	Lima	Americas
Philippines	Chanel Olive Thomas	27	San Antonio	Asia
Poland	Paulina Maziarz	21	Mostki	Europe
Portugal	Priscila Alves	22	Setúbal	Europe
Puerto Rico	Larissa Santiago	26	San Juan	Caribbean
Romania	Bianca Tirsin	19	Arad	Europe
Russia	Anastasia Shcheglova	21	Moscow	Europe
Rwanda	Habiba Ingabire	20	Kigali	Africa
São Tomé and Príncipe	Tatiana Delgado	19	São Tomé	Africa
Scotland	Chloe Kempson	25	Edinburgh	Europe
Serbia	Bojana Bojanić	23	Belgrade	Europe
Singapore	Lynn Teo	25	Singapore	Asia
Slovakia	Michaela Cmarková	22	Kanianka	Europe
South Africa	Bianca Olivier	25	Pretoria	Africa
South Korea	Jenny Kim	23	Seoul	Asia
South Sudan	Anyier Deng Yuol	23	Juba	Africa
Spain	Beatriz Balseiro Cendán	19	Vilalba	Europe
Suriname	Farahnaaz Margarett	19	Paramaribo	Caribbean
Switzerland	Mariela Nova	22	Vevey	Europe
Thailand	Jiraprapa Boonnuang	22	Yasothon	Asia
Turkey	Yasemin Çoklar	19	Istanbul	Europe
United States	Marlene Mendoza	27	Paterson	Americas
Venezuela	Geraldine Duque	25	San Cristóbal	Americas
Vietnam	Nguyễn Đình Khánh Phương	22	Hanoi	Asia
Wales	Rachel Tate	28	St Asaph	Europe
Zimbabwe	Letwin Tatenda	25	Harare	Africa
