= Choi Soon-hwa =

South Korean model (born 1943)

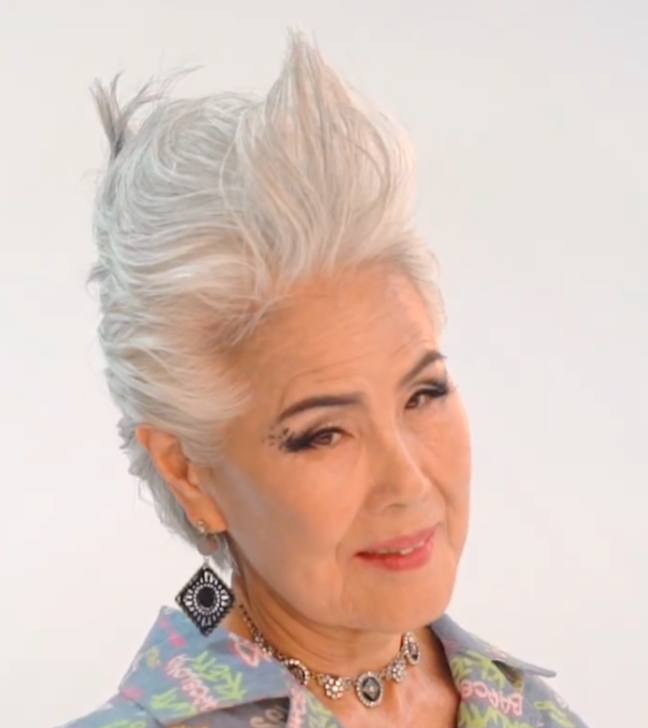
- Choi in 2019
- Born: October 11, 1943 (age 82); Masan, then part of Korea, Empire of Japan
- Occupations: Model, care worker
- Children: 2

Korean name
- Hangul: 최순화
- RR: Choe Sunhwa
- MR: Ch'oe Sunhwa

Choi Soon-hwa (Korean: 최순화; born October 11, 1943) is a South Korean model and former pastor, nurse, and care worker. She is the oldest professional model in South Korea, becoming a model at 72. She garnered international attention upon competing in Miss Universe Korea.

== Biography ==
Choi was born on October 11, 1943, in Masan, which was then under Japanese colonial rule. Her grandmother owned a food stall next to a local cinema and she would sneak her inside to see the costumes and sets. She married and her husband abandoned her, leaving her to raise their two children on her own. Choi worked as a nurse and as a Christian pastor before retiring at 68.

After retirement, she lost a large amount of money which she lent to a confidence trickster. As a result she returned to work as a care nurse, freelancing seven days a week.

An evangelist whom she was caring for told her that she should be a model, and Soon-hwa ultimately decided to follow that path. She auditioned for her first role at 72, and rapidly became well-known, dubbed a "legend" for her modeling. After initially taking just one day a week off work as a nurse to model, she left nursing permanently to work full-time as a model. She also studied at a modeling school. She practiced her runway walk in hospital corridors while patients slept. She became the oldest professional model in South Korea. She was also the oldest model ever at Seoul Fashion Week, appearing in 2019 at 76. Her grey hair, which she initially considered dyeing, has been called her "signature look".

She competed in Miss Universe Korea in 2024, becoming the oldest contestant to ever compete, as previously that year the contest removed rules requiring models to be under 28. She was a finalist in the competition. While she did not win, she was awarded "Best Dressed". She has stated her intention was to "stun the world".

She has appeared in campaigns for Harper's Bazaar and Elle, among others. She has advised people to "chase their dreams, big or small". She has been listed as an inspiration by both other models and fans.
