= Miss Queen Korea =

Beauty pageant

Miss Queen Korea Organization 미스 퀸 코리아
- Formation: 2018; 8 years ago
- Type: Beauty pageant
- Headquarters: Seoul
- Location: South Korea
- Members: Miss Universe; Miss World; Miss Supranational
- Official language: Korean
- Parent organization: PJP
- Website: http://missqueenkorea.com http://www.missuniversekorea.co.kr http://www.missworldkorea.com

Miss Queen Korea (Korean: 미스 퀸 코리아) is a national beauty pageant responsible for selecting South Korea's representative to the Miss Universe and Miss World pageant.

== History ==
In 1957 the first Miss Korea competition took place in 1957 and was sponsored by the Korean newspaper Hankook Ilbo. In 1959, Hankook Ilbo sent first Miss World contestant who represents Korea. The winner of Miss Korea traditionally competed at the Miss Universe between 1957 and 2015, 1st runner-up of Miss Korea competed Miss World between 1959 and 2010. In 2011 the new pageant comes from Park Jeong-ah pageant and holds a pageant, Miss World Korea competition, later Park launched Miss Universe Korea pageant in 2016, Miss Supranational franchise in 2017. The first edition of "Miss Queen Korea", three titles go to Grand slam pageants: Miss Universe, Miss World, Miss Supranational. Began 2022 the Miss Queen Korea took over the Miss Universe and Miss World only.

== International crowns ==
- One – Miss Supranational winner:
  - Jenny Kim (2017)

== Placements at international pageants ==
=== Current licenses ===
- Miss Universe. The highest result is Jenny Kim as Miss Congeniality of Miss Universe 2016.
- 3 placements at Miss World. The highest result is Do Kyung-min as Top 7 of Miss World 2011.

=== Past licenses ===
- 1 placements at Miss Supranational. The highest result is Jenny Kim as Miss Supranational 2017.

== Titles ==
Number of wins from Miss Queen Korea (past licenses)
Pageant	Wins
Female international beauty pageants:
Miss Supranational	1
Queen of International Tourism	0

Number of wins from Miss Queen Korea (current licenses)
Pageant	Wins
Female international beauty pageants:
Miss Universe	0
Miss World	0
Male international beauty pageants:
Mister World	0

Note that the year designates the time Miss Queen Korea has acquired that particular pageant franchise.

Current

- Miss Universe (2016–present)
- Miss World (2011–present)
- Mister World (2014–present)

Past

- Miss Supranational (2014, 2017–2021)
- Queen of International Tourism (2024)

== Titleholders ==
Year	Miss Universe Korea Winner	Runners Up & Sponsor Award	Special Awards, Final Participant
2016	Cho Se-whee	(1st) Yoo Da-hyeon (2nd) Jiyu Park, Songyeon Kwon (3rd) Dahee Park, Kim Daun, Lee Ji-eun	Sein Park, Yang Gyu-won, Park Go-eun
2021	Jisu Kim	(1st) Kim Hanna (2nd) Seok Yu-jin, Song Yu-jin (3rd) Noseong Kim, Byun Hyo-jeong	Kim No-seong
2023	Kim So-yun	(1st) Kim Seo-young, Yoo Jeong-yeon (2nd) Choi Eun-gang, Park So-li, Park Se-yeon (Sponsor Award) Nari Kim, Yang Seon-ah, Choi Yun-hee	Jeong Yun-jeong, Kang So-myeong, Jinah Lee, Song Yeonji, Yeji Kim, Eunji Lee, Jeong Myeong-moon, Kim Hee-kyung
2024	Han Ariel	(1st) Park Se-hee, Lee Yu-jeong (2nd) Lee Eun-bi, Shin Eun-young, Lee Hye-bin	Choi Soon-hwa, Lee Na-kyung, Choi Ji-an, Park Joo-hee, Lee Ji-won, Kim Yu-rim, Hong Jeong-yoon, Jeong So-ra, Chaehee Jang
2025	(Jin) Lee Soo-yeon	(1st Seon) Bae Ji-yoon, Lee Chae-rin (2nd Mi) Choi Hye-eun, Seok Min-ah, Yoon Baek-yeon	Lee Si-heon, Kim Ji-yoon, Yoon Chae-won, Park Nam-hee, Choi Hye-yoon, Na Hyun-jung, Lee Chae-rin
2025	Season 2 (Ms.) (Jin) Lee Seo-hyun	(1st Seon) Lee Soo-jin, Seo Yoon-hee (2nd Mi) Jeon Seo-eun, Choi Hye-yoon, Park Jeong-hyeon, Kim Ji-woon	Choi Soo-ji, Hwang So-yoon, Lee Soo-jung, Ahn Gyeong-ju, Choi Mi-hyeon, Kim Seon-ju, Ko In-hyeong
2025	Season 2 (Classic) (Jin) Lee Ji-young	(1st Seon) Jeong Ji-hyeon, Park So-da-mi (2nd Mi) Lee Ji-ah, Park Soo-kyung	Kang Min-joo, Lee Seo-won, Hyun Yoon-ji, Park So-da-mi
2026	(Jin) Yurim Kim	(1st Seon) Woo Hye-min, Lee Hwa-in (2nd Mi) Seon Eun-ji, Ju A-rin, Choi Seo-hee, Park Nam-hee	Kim Ga-young, Seok Da-yun, Choi Eun-bin, Kim Myung-kyung, Elsa, Shin Yu-jeong, Kim Dong-young, Lee Jin-i, Young Seol-hwa, Kim Ji-yu, Lee Do-yun, Park In-seo, Jihee Cha
2026	Season 2 (Ms.)	TBA	TBA
2026	Season 2 (Classic)	TBA	TBA

Year	Miss World Korea Winner	Runners Up & Sponsor Award	Special Awards, Final Participant
2011	Do Kyung-min	(1st) Kim Sung-min (2nd) Park Min-ji (3rd) Aeyoung Yoon (4th) Hyewon Kim (5th) Park Hye-yoon (6th) Yoo Ji-hee	Not awarded
2014	Song Hwa-young	(1st) Kim Min-ji (2nd) Chyung Eun-ju, Mina Jeong (3rd) Tak Hee-jeong, Hong U-ri, Sumin Kim	Yumin Jeong, Park Hong-hee, Hyona Park, Ra ji-young, Soyeon Park
2015	Wang Hyun	(1st) Jenny Kim (2nd) Baek Ye-rim, Lee Do-won (3rd) Elena Lee, Go Min-jeong, Ahn Jeong-yoon	Jo Eun-ha-neul, Park Chan-ah, Hong Da-in, Go A-ra, Jo Hyeon-jeong, Won Ok, Choi Ah-hyun
2016	Kim Ha-eun	(1st) Jeon Se-hwi (2nd) Chaehyung Lee, Sun Gyeong-i (3rd) Lee Won-kyung, Jooyoung Choi, Boyoung Choi	Hyein Kang, Kim Ji-won
2021	Tara Hong	(1st) Jinhee Park (2nd) Baek Ga-hyeon, Noh Eun (3rd) Jeon Ga-eun, Kim Song-i	Kim No-seong
2023	Lijin Kim	(1st) Min Jung, Bae Song-bin (2nd) Jeon Eul-hye, Sa Ha-hyeon, Hwang Ha-je	Oh Yoo-jeong, Lee Chae-bin
2026	(Jin) Cha Minseo	(1st Seon) Choi Seo-woo, Hwang Yoon-ji (2nd Mi) Choi Ga-yeon, Lee Joo-hyang, Kim Ji-woo (2nd Global Mi) Mari	Hwang Yoon-ji, Lalita, Lee Si-heon, Shim Soo-hyun, Christina, Laura, Yoon Seung-hee, Kim Ri-won, Shin Ha-rim, Kim Na-kyung, Kim Joo-ah

Year	Miss Queen Korea Winner	Runners Up & Sponsor Award	Special Awards, Final Participant
2018	Miss Universe Korea; Baek Ji-hyun; Miss World Korea; Cho Ah; Miss Supranational Korea; Lee Eun-bi	(1st) Elena Lee (2nd) Seonyoung Kook, Kwon Whee (3rd) Harim Goo, Taeyoung Kim, Lee Yeon-joo	Chaerin Jang, Bin Ji-young, Lee Na-hyeon
2019	Miss Universe Korea; Lee Yeon-joo	(1st) Park Ha-ri (2nd) Seunghyun Kim (3rd) Ha Seo-bin	Yejin Lim, Lee Hwa-young, Seunghyun Kim, Park Ha-ri, Hwajin Lee, Kwon Whee
2019	Miss World Korea; Lim Ji-yeon	(1st) Jijeong Park (2nd) Hwajin Lee (3rd) Noh Gyu-oh	Yejin Lim, Lee Hwa-young, Seunghyun Kim, Park Ha-ri, Hwajin Lee, Kwon Whee
2019	Miss Supranational Korea; Kwon Whee	(1st) Hyesoo Jeon (2nd) Hwang Chae-won (3rd) Sujeong Yoo	Yejin Lim, Lee Hwa-young, Seunghyun Kim, Park Ha-ri, Hwajin Lee, Kwon Whee
2020	Due to the COVID-19 pandemic, the National Competition will not be held in 2020.		

Year	Mister World Korea Winner	Runners Up	Special Awards
2014	Seo Young-suk	(1st) Kim Seong-eon (2nd) Im Hyun-woo, Kim Dae-young (3rd) Lee Hwang-hyun, Lee Ji-han, Park Geun-jong	Lee Young-jun, Kim Jae-hyeop
2015	Im Seung-jun	(1st) Koo Seung-hwan (2nd) Jung Koo-young (3rd) Lee Min-gu	Kim Hee-hwan, Yoo Tae-gye

== Titleholders under Miss Queen Korea org. ==
=== Miss Universe Korea 2016—Present ===
- : Declared as Winner
- : Ended as runner-up
- : Ended as top 5/8 qualification
- : Ended as one of the finalists or semifinalists
- : Ended as special awards

Since 2016 the Miss Queen Korea took over the license of Miss Universe Organization. The winner of Miss Miss Universe Korea represents his country at Miss Universe On occasion, when the winner does not qualify (due to age) for either contest, a runner-up is sent.

Miss Queen Korea Universe
Year	Province	Representative	Korean Name	National Title	Placement at MU	Special Awards	Notes
2026	Seoul	Yurim Kim	김유림	Miss Universe Korea 2026	TBA	TBA	Note: Won 1st place in the Fitness Division (Women's) at the 2018 Fin International MAXQ Musclemania Fitness Korea Championship
2025	Gyeongbuk	Lee Soo-yeon	이수연	Miss Universe Korea 2025	Unplaced		Note: Second Runner-up of Miss Korea in 2017.
2024	Seoul	Han Ariel	아리엘 한	Miss Universe Korea 2024	Unplaced		Note: First Runner-up of Miss Seoul Gyeonggi Incheon 2024
2023	Gyeongnam	Kim So-yun	김소윤	Miss Universe Korea 2023	Unplaced		Note: First Runner-up of Miss Gyeongnam 2022 & Special Award of Miss Korea 2022
2022	Seoul	Kim Hanna	김한나	Miss Universe Korea 2021 (1st Runner-up)	Unplaced		Appointed: There was no national competition, a runner-up of last year took over the Miss Universe 2022 competition.; Miss Seoul 2021 Finalists
2021	Seoul	Kim Jisu	김지수	Miss Universe Korea 2021	Unplaced		
2020	Incheon	Park Ha-ri	박하리	Miss Queen Korea — Universe 2019 (1st Runner-up)	Unplaced		Appointed: Due to the impact of COVID-19 pandemic, the First Runner-up of 2019 crowned as the Miss Queen Korea 2020.
2019	Incheon	Lee Yeon-joo	이연주	Miss Queen Korea — Universe 2019	Unplaced		
2018	Daegu	Baek Ji-hyun	백지현	Miss Queen Korea — Universe 2018	Unplaced		Note: Second Runner-up of Miss Korea in 2014.
2017	Gyeonggi	Cho Se-whee	조세휘	Miss Universe Korea 2016	Unplaced		Note: Cho was competing at the Miss Korea 2014, representing Gyeonggi; she was also first runner-up of Miss Gyeonggi in 2014.
2016	Seoul	Kim Jenny	김제니	Miss World Korea 2015 (1st Runner-up)	Unplaced	Miss Congeniality	Appointed: From Miss World Korea by national director Park Jeong-ah; later, she won Miss Supranational 2017 in Poland on December 2, 2017.
List of Miss Universe Participant from 1954 – 2015

=== Miss World Korea 2011—Present ===
- : Declared as Winner
- : Ended as runner-up
- : Ended as top 5/8 qualification
- : Ended as one of the finalists or semifinalists
- : Ended as special awards

The winner of Miss World Korea represents his country at Miss World. the titleholder will be replaced when annual pageant postponed or suspended. Before 2011 the 1st runner-up of Miss Korea traditionally represented South Korea at Miss World pageant.

Miss Queen Korea World
Year	Province	Representative	Korean Name	National Title	Placement at MW	Special Awards	Notes
2027	TBA						
2026	Seoul	Cha Minseo	차민서	Miss World Korea 2026	Unplaced	Top 20 - Head to Head Challenge (Top 5 of Asia & Oceania)	
2025	Seoul	Min Jung	정민	Miss World Korea 2023 (1st Runner-up)	Did not compete due to injury		
2024	Miss World 2023 was rescheduled to 9 March 2024, no pageant in 2024						
2023	Incheon	Lijin Kim	김리진	Miss World Korea 2023	Unplaced	Miss World Sport (Top 32)	Note: Miss Gyeonggi Incheon 2023 Photogenic Award
2023	Seoul	Byun Hyo-jeong	변효정	Miss Universe Korea 2021 (3rd Runner-up)	Competition venue change and Postponed		Selected: (Audition) — Miss World Korea 2022; Miss Gyeongbuk 2021 Finalists & Miss Seoul 2021 Finalists
2022	Seoul	Park Jin-hee	박진희	Miss World Korea 2021 (1st Runner-up)	Miss World 2021 was rescheduled to 16 March 2022 due to the COVID-19 pandemic, no edition started in 2022		
2021	Seoul	Tara Hong	홍태라	Miss World Korea 2021	Unplaced	Best Designer Dress Award; Miss World Talent (Top 27); Miss World Sport (Top 32)	Note: The coronation was originally scheduled to be held on 16 December 2021
2020	Seoul	Park Ji-jeong	박지정	Miss Queen Korea — World 2019 (1st Runner-up)	Due to the impact of COVID-19 pandemic, no competition held		
2019	Seoul	Lim Ji-yeon	임지연	Miss Queen Korea — World 2019	Unplaced		
2018	Seoul	Cho Ah	조아	Miss Queen Korea — World 2018	Unplaced	Miss World Top Model (3rd Runner-up)	Note: Korea Hanbok Model Pageant Contest 2018 Best Smile Award
2017	Seoul	Kim Ha-eun	김하은	Miss World Korea 2016	Top 10	Miss World Asia; Miss World Top Model (Top 30)	
2016	Seoul	Wang Hyun	왕현	Miss World Korea 2015	Top 11		Note: Miss Korea USA 2014 & Miss Korea 2014 Top 15
2015	Seoul	Chyung Eun-ju	정은주	Miss World Korea 2014 (2nd Runner-up)	Unplaced		Note: Miss Korea Brazil 2013 & Miss Daejeon Sejong Chungnam 2014 Finalists
2014	Gyeonggi	Song Hwa-young	송화영	Miss World Korea 2014	Unplaced		
2013	Busan	Park Min-ji	박민지	Miss World Korea 2011 (2nd Runner-up)	Unplaced		
2012	Seoul	Kim Sung-min	김성민	Miss World Korea 2011 (1st Runner-up)	Unplaced		
2011	Daegu	Do Kyung-min	도경민	Miss World Korea 2011	Top 7 (5th place)	Miss World Top Model (Top 10); Miss World Beach Beauty (Top 20)	Note: Miss Gyeongbuk 2011 Finalists
List of Miss World Participant from 1959 – 2010

=== Mister World Korea 2014—Present ===
- : Declared as Winner
- : Ended as runner-up
- : Ended as top 5/6 qualification
- : Ended as one of the finalists or semifinalists
- : Ended as special awards

The winner of Mister World Korea represents his country at Mister World. Miss and Mister World Korea Organization sent to Mister World in 2014.

Mister World Korea
Year	Province	Representative	Korean Name	National Title	Placement	Special Awards	Notes
2027	TBA						
2024	Did not compete						
Due to the impact of COVID-19 pandemic, no competition held
2019	Incheon	Na Gi-wook	나기욱	Mister World Korea 2019 — Appointed	Unplaced		Appointed: Mister International Korea 2018 Top 13 & Best Model Award
2019	Seoul	Im Seung-jun	임승준	Mister World Korea 2015	Did not compete		
2016	Seoul	Seo Young-suk	서영석	Mister World Korea 2014	Unplaced		
2014	Seoul	Lim Jae-yeon	임재연	Mister World Korea 2013 — Appointed	Unplaced		
List of Mister World Participant from 2010

== Past titleholders under Miss Queen Korea org. ==
=== Miss Supranational Korea 2014—2021 ===
- : Declared as Winner
- : Ended as runner-up
- : Ended as top 5/8 qualification
- : Ended as one of the finalists or semifinalists
- : Ended as special awards

The winner of Miss Supranational Korea represents his country at Miss Supranational. Until 2021 the organization sent Korean representatives at Miss Supranational pageant. Began 2022 the license handed to Mister International Korea which also selected Korean representation at Mister Supranational pageant under Miss Supranational Management.

Miss Queen Korea Supranational
Year	Province	Representative	Korean Name	National Title	Placement at MS	Special Awards	Notes
2022	List of Miss Supranational Participant from 2022–present						
2021	Seoul	Hyesoo Jeon	전혜수	Miss Queen Korea — Supranational 2019 (1st Runner-up)	Unplaced		
2020	Due to the impact of COVID-19 pandemic, no competition held						
2019	Seoul	Kwon Whee	권휘	Miss Queen Korea — Supranational 2019	Unplaced		Note: World Miss University Korea 2016
2018	Incheon	Lee Eun-bi	이은비	Miss Queen Korea — Supranational 2018	Unplaced	Best Talent; Best National Costume	Note: Miss Incheon 2017 3rd Place and Friendship Award
2017	Seoul	Jenny Kim	김제니	Miss World Korea 2015 (1st Runner-up)	Miss Supranational 2017		
2016	List of Miss Supranational Participant from 2016						
2014	Daegu	Kim Min-ji	김민지	Miss World Korea 2014 (1st Runner-up)	Unplaced		
2010	List of Miss Supranational Participant from 2010						

=== Queen of International Tourism Korea 2024 ===
- : Declared as Winner
- : Ended as runner-up
- : Ended as top 5/8 qualification
- : Ended as one of the finalists or semifinalists
- : Ended as special awards

Debuted at Queen of International Tourism in 2024.

Miss Queen Korea
Year	Province	Representative	Korean Name	National Title	Placement	Special Awards	Notes
2024	Seoul	Bae Song-bin	배송빈	Miss World Korea 2023 (1st Runner-up)	Unplaced		

== See also ==
- Miss Korea
- Miss Grand Korea
- Mister World Korea
- Mister Korea
- Miss Earth Korea
- Miss International Korea
- Mister International Korea
- Miss Universe Korea Representative
- Miss and Mister World Korea
- Miss and Mister Supranational Korea
