= Ms. Puiyi =

Malaysian media personality, (born 1998)

- 蕭佩兒
- Born: August 1, 1998 (age 28); Kuala Lumpur, Malaysia
- Occupations: Producer; Media Personality; Model; DJ; Pornographic Actress
- Height: 165 cm (5 ft 5 in)
- Website: Ms. Puiyi on Instagram mspuiyi.com

Siew Pui Yi (born August 1, 1998), also known as Ms. Puiyi (stylized as MSPUIYI), is a Malaysian media personality, social media influencer, music producer, DJ. In 2019, Ms Puiyi experienced a hacking incident that led to the unauthorized leaking of her nude photos. As a result, she chose to create and monetize her photos through the subscription platform OnlyFans.

Ms Puiyi has over 23 million Instagram followers, 1.4 million TikTok followers, and over 800,000 YouTube subscribers.

== Background ==
=== Personal life ===
Siew Pui Yi was born in Kuala Lumpur, Malaysia, and grew up alongside two sisters. At the age of 10, her family relocated to Penang.

=== Education ===
Ms Puiyi attended SMK Datuk Onn for her secondary education and subsequently enrolled in a college in Penang. In a self-produced documentary, she disclosed that she decided to move college in Kuala Lumpur due to feeling creatively stifled and lacking sufficient room for personal growth in Penang.

Ms Puiyi graduated with a Bachelor of Science in Business Administration from Troy University in 2021.

== Career ==
Ms Puiyi is a DJ, online influencer, and entrepreneur. At a young age, Ms Puiyi began participating in beauty competitions while also working as a model for magazines. She creates content on multiple social media platforms and has founded two beauty product lines, namely Kiseki Skincare and MSPUIYI Cosmetics. She released a personal photobook titled "Be My Sugar" in 2019, investing her savings of around MYR 10,000 into its production. She started her career as a freelance model. At 19, she signed three contracts with an artist management industry. In 2016, she was selected as one of the Top 100 Sexiest Women in Malaysia by a Malaysian magazine.

Ms Puiyi started an OnlyFans account in 2019. In late 2019, Ms Puiyi's laptop was hacked into while being repaired, resulting in unauthorized access to her Google Drive accounts, including personal and unreleased nude photos. Fans alerted her about suspicious emails promoting the sale of these photos. Subsequently, Ms Puiyi had to pay a MYR 18,000 fee to the hackers. In an attempt to meet with them at a Shell petrol station, three helmet-wearing individuals damaged her car mirror, stole the cash, and fled the scene.

Following the incident involving the stolen photos, Ms Puiyi shared her story on social media, explaining her temporary absence. Her experience gained attention online, generating headlines and engaging netizens. The hackers again attempted to extort MYR 50,000 from her, but she resolved not to be controlled by others and instead chose to monetize her own pictures. On 3 December 2022, she announced that she would be quitting the platform to become a DJ. Following her sudden retirement, Puiyi was contacted by SWAG to sign a contract. She drew the attention of media publications like Penthouse POM and Hypebeast. She made history as the first Southeast Asian to be featured on the cover of Penthouse POM magazine in January 2022. She also made history as the first Malaysian artist to be featured on the cover of JKF magazine in April 2024. She shares content and DJ clips on TikTok.

On 2 January 2021, Puiyi launched her cosmetic brand Ms Puiyi Cosmetics. Ms Puiyi Cosmetics offers lip gloss, lip matte, and other beauty products, with its flagship offering being the Matte Liquid Lipsticks. These lipsticks are available in 9 shades: Player, Filthy, Skin, Risque, Cheeky, Passion, Fruity, Sugar, and Foreplay. She was featured on the January/February edition cover. On 9 May 2022, Puiyi released her debut single "Men-Mory," which hit one million streams on Spotify and 10 million views on Instagram Reels. She collaborated with Malaysia's award-winning producer, Goldfish, for the song. She has hosted events in countries such as Malaysia, UK, Myanmar, and Hong Kong.

In November 2022, she secured an acting role in an upcoming local movie KL Love Story as a DJ. She also starred in the horror film Pulau, which was released in March 2023.

In July 2024, Puiyi announced that she had won RM 4.3 million in a judgment by default against her former business partner, "Mentos" Lai Kai Jian as he had fraudulently received from her under the pretext of settling her tax arrears. As a result of her non-payment of taxes, she was placed under a three-month travel ban and not able to be engaged in overseas work. Lai was not contactable up till the completion of legal proceedings.

== Philanthropy ==
In February 2023, Puiyi launched a US$1mil (RM4.4mil) scholarship program in collaboration with Educapital Foundation to help underprivileged students complete their education. Each student is granted US$1,000 (RM4,433) to pursue education in the field of their choice.

== Controversies ==
=== Risqué dressing in London ===
In May 2022, Ms Puiyi wore revealing outfits during her visits to the National Gallery of London and The British Museum. She posted pictures on Instagram, including one where she wore a see-through top without a bra and another where she exposed her breasts. While some of her followers praised her content, others had mixed opinions regarding the appropriateness of her attire for these particular venues.

=== Wearing áo dài without trousers ===
In a photo shared on 4 April 2022, Ms Puiyi sparked a wave of criticism as she was seen wearing the Vietnamese áo dài without trousers and exposing her buttocks. Local netizens expressed their disapproval on Instagram, deeming her attire as "disrespectful" and "immodest." Two days later, she issued an apology on Facebook, conveying her regrets in Vietnamese, English, and Mandarin.

=== Intimate video with Titus Low ===
On 4 October 2022, Ms Puiyi shared a TikTok video featuring what appeared to be intimate behavior with fellow influencer Titus Low. Both individuals claimed it was a collaboration. Notably, Low was engaged to influencer Cheryl Chin at the time. Cheryl expressed her discomfort with the content by commenting on the now-deleted TikTok, stating, "I guess this is content but there are boundaries, no?". This sparked outrage among fans who deemed Low's behavior inappropriate given his relationship status. Low apologised for his actions assuring that such actions would not recur in the future.
