= Sanjna Suri =

Malaysian pharmacist, beauty pageant titleholder, singer, model and actress

- Born: Sanjna Kishore Kumar Suri; March 31, 1993 (age 33); Ipoh, Perak, Malaysia
- Education: University of Cyberjaya (BPharm)
- Occupations: Pharmacist; actress; model; beauty pageant titleholder
- Height: 1.75 m (5 ft 9 in)
- Spouse: Bram Demeulenaere (m. 2025)
- Beauty pageant titleholder
- Title: Miss Scuba Malaysia 2015; Miss Intercontinental Malaysia 2017; Miss Supranational Malaysia 2018
- Years active: 2015–present
- Hair colour: Black
- Eye colour: Black
- Major competitions: Miss Grand Malaysia 2017 (Winner – Miss Intercontinental Malaysia); Miss Intercontinental 2017 (Top 18); Miss Supranational 2018 (Top 25)

Sanjna Suri (born 31 March 1991) is a Malaysian pharmacist, beauty pageant titleholder, singer, model, and actress. She rose to fame after winning Miss Intercontinental Malaysia in 2017. She then represented Malaysia at Miss Scuba International 2015, Face of Asia 2017 International Model, Miss Intercontinental 2017, and Miss Supranational 2018.

== Background ==
Sanjna was born in Ipoh, Perak. She is of North Indian descent. Sanjna speaks English, Malay, and Hindi.

=== Education background ===
Sanjna is a Pharmacy graduate from University of Cyberjaya. Over the course of her studies there, she received the Dean's List award six times.

== Pageantry ==
=== Miss Scuba International 2015 ===
Following her involvement in Miss Malaysia Indian Global 2014 competition, Sanjna was handpicked to represent Malaysia at the Miss Scuba International 2015 held in Kota Kinabalu, Sabah, and was placed Top 5 in Talent.

=== Face of Asia 2017 International Model ===
In May 2017, Sanjna competed in Face of Malaysia 2017 competition. She finished as the second runner-up and gained the right to represent Malaysia at Face of Asia 2017 International Model competition in Seoul, Korea.

=== Miss Intercontinental 2017 ===
In August 2017, Sanjna competed in Miss Grand Malaysia pageant and finished as the second runner-up. She was able to represent Malaysia at Miss Intercontinental 2017 in Egypt and was placed in the top 18 semifinalists.

=== Miss Supranational 2018 ===
In July 2018, Sanjna was appointed to represent Malaysia at Miss Supernatural 2018 by license holder, Ratu Malaysia Organisation. The pageant was held in Krynica-Zdrój, Poland in December 2018, where she finished in the top 25 semifinalists.

== Acting career ==
=== 2018-2019 ===
In 2018, Sanjna appeared in the series, Salon that was aired on NTV7 and Viu. Her first Malay movie, Sangkar is set to be released in 2019. She plays alongside Zul Ariffin and Remy Ishak.

== Modelling ==
Sanjna was featured in the magazine, Nona in April 2018 and Royal Raya 2018 campaign by Shanell Harun. She is also a muse for famed Malaysian designers such as Anuar Faizal, Shanell Harun, Ezuwan Ismail, Edna Mode, Jimmy Couture and Ridzuan Bohari.

== Filmography ==
=== Film ===
Year	Title	Role	Director	Notes	Ref.
2019	Sangkar	Priya	Kabir Bhatia	Supporting role.	
2019	Ennaval		Saran Z	Cameo	
2022	Nasi Lemak 1.0	Hasina	Namewee		
2022	Aval Thediyathu		Dato Athy Muthoo		
2022	Mundey Kampung Dey		Mansher Singh	First Punjabi language movie to be produced in Malaysia.	
2023	Pulau	Yus	Euho		
2024	Baik Punya Ah Long	MC	Afdlin Shauki		

=== Television ===
Year	Title	Role	Channel	Ref.
2018	Salon	Bella/ Belinda	Viu, NTV7	
2019	Aku Yang Kau Tinggalkan	Monica	TV1	
2020	Sepenggal Puisi	-	Astro Citra	

=== Music videos ===
Year	Title	Artist	Ref.
2021	Sarrekey	Pak Azad	
2021	Curry & Roti	Namewee	

== Other ventures ==
=== Product endorsements ===
In 2017, Sanjna starred in TV commercial for Vitagen Malaysia. She is one of the ambassadors for Kronenbourg 1664 alongside Venice Min, Josh Kua, Neal Edwin, and Brynn Lovett. She is also the brand ambassador for HABIB Jewels, Malaysia's premier jeweller.

== Awards and nominations ==
Year	Award	Category	Nominated work	Result	Reference
2022	World Outstanding Grandmasters Excellence Award	Malaysia Most Outstanding Best Upcoming Actress Excellence Award	Herself	Won	

Awards and achievements
Preceded by Joanne Majalap	Miss Scuba Malaysia; 2015	Succeeded by Goh Pix Xie
Preceded by Livonia Ricky	Miss Intercontinental Malaysia; 2017	Succeeded by Scarlett Megan Liew
Preceded by Julylen Liew Gizelle	Miss Supranational Malaysia; 2018	Succeeded by Melisha Lin
