= Miss São Tomé and Príncipe =

Beauty pageant

- Formation: 2014; 12 years ago
- Type: Beauty pageant
- Headquarters: São Tomé
- Location: São Tomé and Príncipe
- Members: Miss World; Miss Supranational
- Official language: Portuguese

Miss São Tomé and Príncipe is a national Beauty pageant in São Tomé and Príncipe.

== Miss World ==
Color key

- Declared as Winner
- Ended as runner-up
- Ended as one of the finalists or semifinalists

Year	Miss São Tomé and Príncipe	Placement
2014	Djeissica Barbosa	Unplaced

== Miss Supranational ==
Color key

- Declared as Winner
- Ended as runner-up
- Ended as one of the finalists or semifinalists

Year	Miss São Tomé and Príncipe	Placement
2014	Wilma Varela	Unplaced
2017	Tatiana Delgado	Unplaced

== See also ==
- Miss World
