= University of Cyberjaya =

Private university in Malaysia

University of Cyberjaya (UoC)
- Universiti Cyberjaya
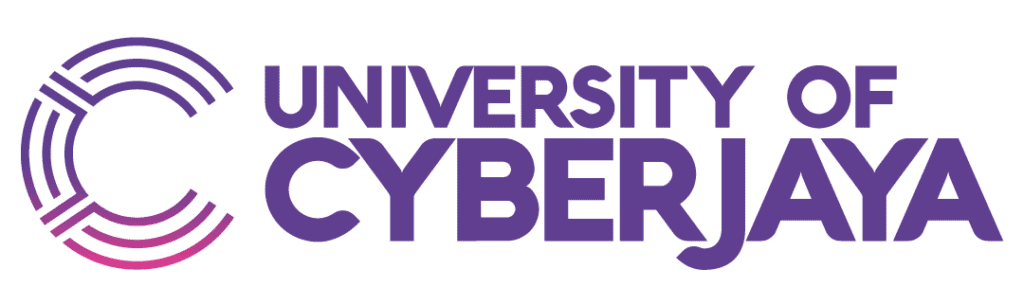
- Former name: Cyberjaya University College of Medical Sciences (CUCMS)
- Type: Private
- Established: October 2005
- Affiliations: Wholly owned subsidiary of Cyberjaya Education Group Berhad
- Academic affiliations: Cyberjaya College Kota Kinabalu, Cyberjaya College Kuching
- Chancellor: Tan Sri Dato' Seri Dr. Noor Hisham Abdullah
- Vice-Chancellor: Prof. Dr. David Whitford
- Faculty: 300
- Students: 7,000
- Location: Persiaran Bestari, Cyber 11, 63000 Cyberjaya, Selangor Darul Ehsan, Malaysia, Cyberjaya, Selangor, Malaysia; 2.9308°N 101.6373°E
- Campus: Suburb
- Language: English
- Colours: Purple, Pink, Yellow, Teal
- Website: www.cyberjaya.edu.my
- University of Cyberjaya

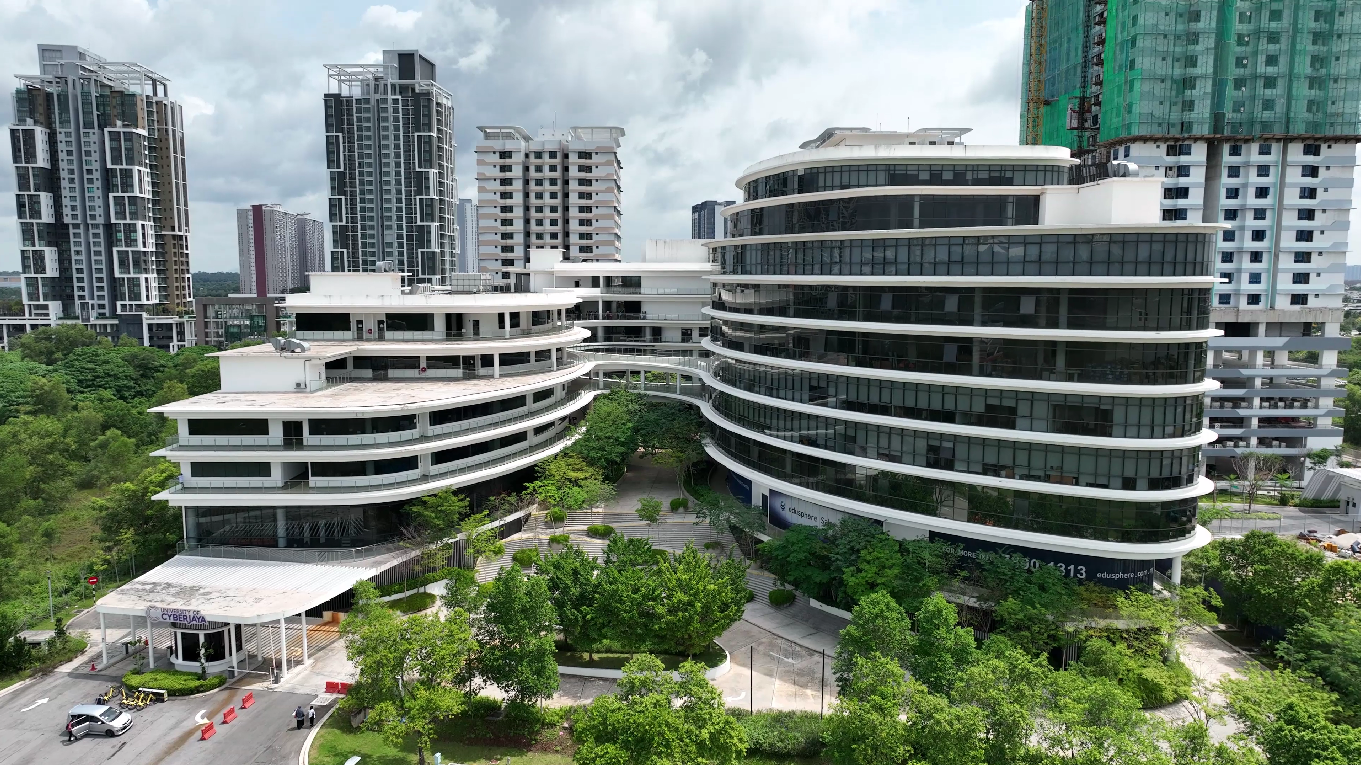
University of Cyberjaya

University of Cyberjaya (UoC) is a private university established in 2005, located in Cyberjaya, Sepang District, Selangor, Malaysia. The institution initially started with a medicine and pharmacy faculty. Over the years, the university has expanded to now offering more than 50 programmes including business, psychology, biomedical engineering, nursing and creative arts and design.

== History ==
University of Cyberjaya was granted full university status in 2019, having been originally established as Cyberjaya University College of Medical Sciences (CUCMS) on 23 October 2005.

The institution originally consisted of two faculties offering two bachelor's degree programmes in medicine and pharmacy. It operated out of its first campus at Street Mall, Cyberjaya.

In 2009, CUCMS moved to a new location in anticipation of student growth. The campus offered increased student capacity and fully equipped teaching facilities.

In 2010, three additional faculties were established to offer allied health science, occupational safety & health, and complementary medicine programmes.

Abu Abdullah was appointed as the new President on 4 January 2010.

By 2013, the University is acquired by SMR Group.

In 2015, CUCMS established its Faculty of Safety and Health from the previous School of Business. In 2018, CUCMS moved into its brand-new, purpose-built campus (current campus) along Persiaran Bestari.

University rankings

Global – Overall
- QS World: 951-1000 (2026)

In 2019, Professor Emeritus Anuwar Ali was appointed as the second chancellor of the university. In 2023, the university established its Faculty of Creative Art and Design and Centre of Biomedical Engineering.

In October 2023, Tan Sri Dato' Seri Dr. Noor Hisham Abdullah was appointed as the third chancellor of the university.

== Notable alumni ==
- Sanjna Suri - beauty pageant titleholder, singer, model, actress and former pharmacist.
- Nur Dhabitah Sabri - Malaysian professional diver

== See also ==
- List of universities in Malaysia
