= Cho Se-whee =

South Korean model (born 1991)

- Born: 14 June 1991 (age 35); Gyeonggi, South Korea
- Height: 1.71 m (5 ft 7 1/2 in)
- Beauty pageant titleholder
- Title: Miss Universe Korea 2017
- Hair color: Dark Brown
- Eye color: Dark Brown
- Major competitions: Miss Gyeonggi 2014 (1st runner-up), Miss Korea 2014, Miss Universe Korea 2017 (Winner), Miss Universe 2017 (Unplaced)

Cho Se-whee (Korean: 조세휘, born 14 June 1991), also spelled Cho Se-hui, is a South Korean model and beauty pageant titleholder who was crowned Miss Universe Korea for 2017. Cho represented South Korea at Miss Universe 2017.

== Miss Gyeonggi 2014 ==
Cho competed at the Miss Gyeonggi 2014 pageant, becoming 1st runner-up.

== Miss Korea 2014 ==
Cho competed at Miss Korea 2014, but did not place.

== Miss Universe Korea 2017 ==
Cho was crowned Miss Universe Korea 2017 on October 23, 2016, by her predecessor Jenny Kim. She also won the Miss Talent award.

== Miss Universe 2017 ==
Cho represented South Korea at Miss Universe 2017 in Las Vegas, but did not place.

== General references ==
- "Cho SeWhee". missuniverse.org. IMG Universe.

Awards and achievements
Preceded by Jenny Kim	Miss Universe Korea; 2017	Succeeded by Baek Ji-hyun
