= Valeria Vázquez =

Puerto Rican beauty pageant titleholder (born 1993)

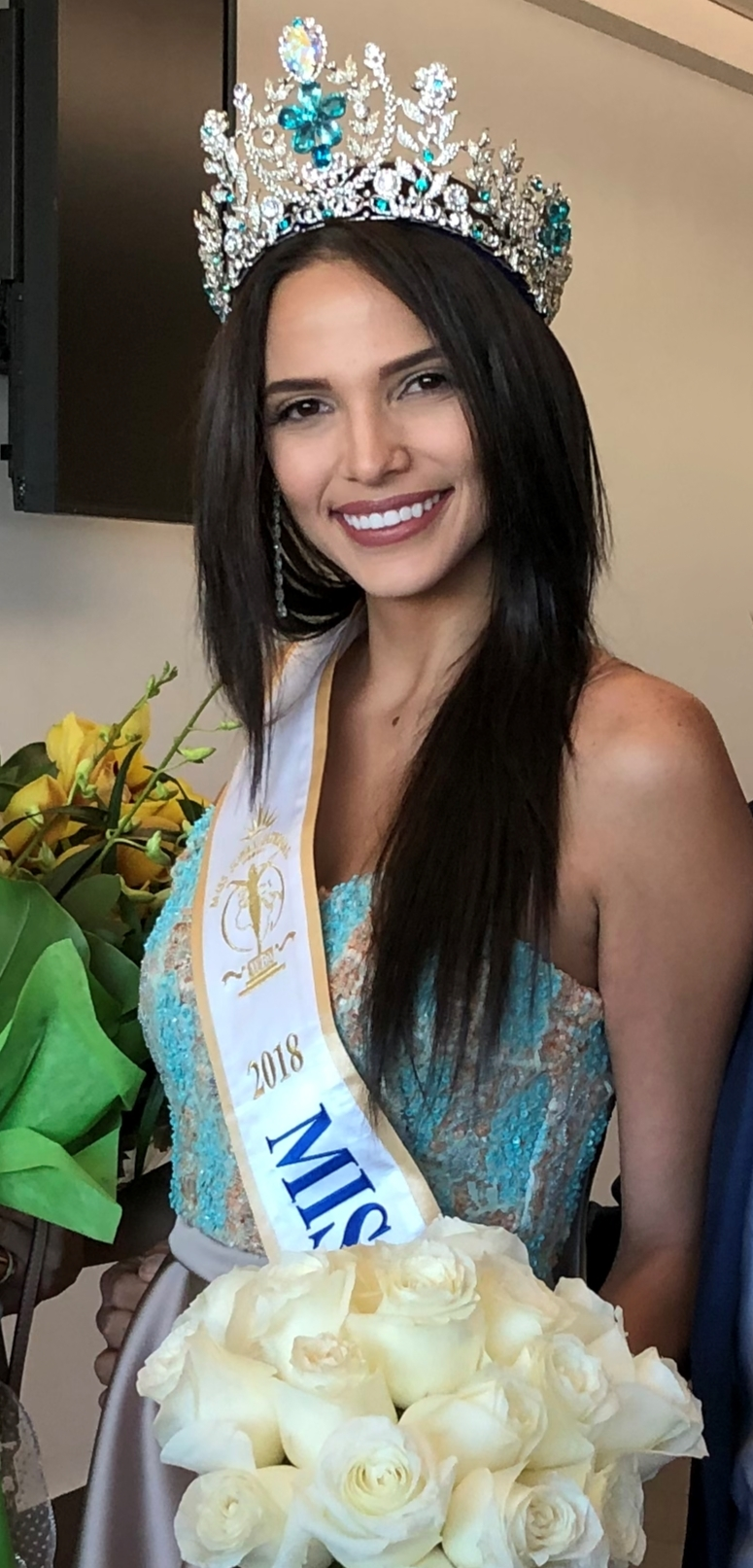
- Latorre in 2018
- Born: Valeria Vázquez Latorre; October 22, 1994 (age 31); San Juan, Puerto Rico
- Education: University of Puerto Rico
- Height: 1.79 m (5 ft 10 in)
- Beauty pageant titleholder
- Title: Miss Supranational Puerto Rico 2018; Miss Supranational 2018
- Major competitions: Nuestra Belleza Puerto Rico 2018 (Miss Supranational Puerto Rico); Miss Supranational 2018 (Winner)

Valeria Vázquez Latorre (born October 22, 1994) is a Puerto Rican model, medical laboratory scientist, and beauty pageant titleholder who was crowned Miss Supranational 2018. She became the first Puerto Rican and Caribbean woman to win the title.

== Early life ==
Latorre was born on October 22, 1993 to Rafael Vázquez and María Latorre in San Juan, the capital of Puerto Rico. She graduated from high school with honors. Before being crowned, Latorre studied Medical Technology at the Medical Sciences Campus, University of Puerto Rico. She has actively participated in various fashion events, including San Juan Moda and Dominican Republic Fashion Week.

== Pageantry ==
=== Nuestra Belleza Puerto Rico 2018 ===
Latorre made her pageantry debut when she was crowned Miss Supranational Puerto Rico 2018 by the Nuestra Belleza Puerto Rico organization.

=== Miss Supranational 2018 ===
Latorre represented Puerto Rico for the 10th edition of the Miss Supranational pageant held on December 7, 2018 at Miejski Ośrodek Sportu i Rekreacji (MOSIR) in Krynica-Zdrój, Lesser Poland, Poland. At the end of the event, she managed to achieve the first victory for Puerto Rico and the Caribbean. She was crowned by the previous title holder, Jenny Kim of Korea.

Awards and achievements
Preceded by (South Korea) Jenny Kim	Miss Supranational; 2018	Succeeded by (Thailand) Anntonia Porsild
Preceded by Larissa Santiago	Miss Supranational Puerto Rico; 2018	Succeeded by Shaleyka Vélez
