= Pulau (film) =

2023 Malaysian film

- Theatrical release poster
- Directed by: Euho
- Produced by: Michael Helfman; Fred Chong
- Starring: Amelia Henderson; Alif Satar; Ikmal Amry; Sanjna Suri; Siew Pui Yi
- Production companies: WebTVAsia; My Way Pictures; Filmforce Studio
- Release dates: March 9, 2023 (Malaysia & Brunei); March 16, 2023 (Singapore); March 22, 2023 (Indonesia); March 31, 2023 (Vietnam); June 23, 2023 (Cambodia)
- Running time: 114 minutes
- Country: Malaysia
- Languages: Malay; English
- Box office: MYR 2 Million

Pulau (English: Island) is a 2023 Malaysian Malay-language supernatural horror film directed by Euho. It stars Alif Satar, Amelia Henderson, Ikmal Amry, Sanjna Suri and Siew Pui Yi. Its story follows a group of friends who stay on a deserted island and awaken a vengeful spirit.

== Plot ==
Seven college friends - Kat, her would-be boyfriend Khai, Yus, Dauz, Mark, Lili and her cousin Ben - are spending their first vacation following the COVID-19 pandemic in a resort at the Malaysian coast. One day, they and another student group take a boat tour passing an island with an eerily skull-like mountain, which the skipper, Azhan, refuses to get close to. While diving at a nearby island, Kat, who has an innate ability to see and hear the spirits of the dead, finds several skeletons underwater, has a violent vision and nearly drowns until her friends rescue her. Upon their return, the skipper tells them of a legend that the island is taboo since an evil woman pronounced a curse that killed all its inhabitants two hundred years ago. He cautions them never to set foot upon the island, but the youths disregard his ominous warning.

Once Azhan is gone, the two groups challenge each other to a competition, following which the losing team is made to stay one night on the forbidden island. Kat’s group loses, and the opposing team ferries them to the island the next morning. As they explore the jungle, they come upon a ruined hut in an abandoned village, where they decide to spend the night. Kat, who feels like something has been calling her to the island, has more disturbing dreams in which she sees scenes of a man getting killed and buried in a shallow grave, a woman crying over the man’s death, their hut getting burned down, and the woman later cursing herself into a kuntilanak to take deadly revenge on the islanders.

The next morning, the other students prank them by reneging on their promise to pick them up, leaving Kat and her friends stranded. The next night, Dauz and Yus leave the hut to make love; but during their intercourse, they disturb the marker for the grave Kat saw in her vision, awakening the kuntilanak. She attacks the lovers and drags Dauz to her cave lair, where she slashes his throat with her claws, killing him. The others conduct a search for him in the morning while Mark stays inside the hut, where he is ambushed and killed by the cursed woman.

When Azhan learns of the prank, he sends Kat's group a voice message over the phone to warn them (too late) not to enter the abandoned village and then forces the other students to accompany him in retrieving the youngsters. But just as they come within the stranded youths' sight, the boat’s overheating engine explodes, killing all aboard. Determined to break the curse, the students return to the man’s grave and unearth his remains. Upon touching them, Kat receives another vision sees that the kuntilanak – whose name was Moli in life – was an islander who married Chen An, a Chinese castaway, and became pregnant with his child. The other islanders, distrustful of outsiders, formed a mob and murdered An, causing Moli to have a miscarriage and thus cursing the islanders for their injustice.

The youths set out for the cave but are ambushed by Moli, who kills Lili. During the night, when the youths set up camp, she tries to lure Ben to his death; when Kat stops him, Moli takes Yus instead and kills her just as Kat, Ben and Khai reach the cave. As Ben and Khai vainly try to fight the kuntilanak, Kat hears An's voice whispering in her mind and is led to a doll that he made for their child and which Moli kept after her transformation. When Moli notices this, she pursues Kat, and Ben and Khai are killed while trying to help her escape.

Kat flees back to Moli’s hut, where Moli catches her; but she ceases her attack and resumes her human appearance when Kat calls her by her true name and reminds her of An’s love. Kat implores her to let go of her hate and finally find peace; in response, Moli pushes her off the house’s platform into the nearby sea before she fades into the afterlife. Kat reawakens to find that time has rewound itself to the point where she had nearly drowned on the boating trip, with everyone killed by Moli still alive and well. As they return to the mainland, Kat and Khai consolidate their relationship, and a flashback shows how Moli encountered An after he was washed ashore on the island.

== Cast ==
- Amelia Henderson as Kat
- Alif Satar as Ben
- Ikmal Amry as Khai
- Joey Leong as Lili
- Sanjna Suri as Yus
- Evie Feroza as Moli
- Jazmy Juma as Dauz
- Vikar as Mark
- Namron as Azhan
- Harris Annuar as Desmond
- Sabronzo as Yaya
- Siew Pui Yi as Kitty
- Mark O'Dea as Hero
- Alexander Henderson as Toni

=== Special appearance ===
- Wan Hanafi Su as Tok Penghulu
- Cedric Loo as Chen An
- Eddie Chong as Eddie

== Controversy ==
The release of its trailer attracted controversy in Malaysia due to its perceived sexual nature, including criticism from Communications Minister Fahmi Fadzil and the Malaysian Consultative Council for Islamic Organization. The Film Censorship Board of Malaysia had approved it for screening in 2022, although some scenes cut from the film were used in the trailer. It was banned in the state of Terengganu, however localized versions with appropriate age ratings were released internationally in 2023.
