= Jenny Kim =

South Korean model

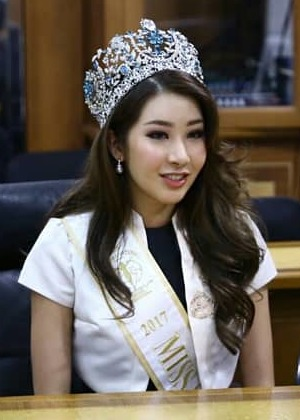
- Kim at the Ministry of Tourism and Creative Economy of The Republic of Indonesia and Puteri Indonesia Pariwisata Press Conference.
- Born: November 22, 1993 (age 32); Seoul, South Korea
- Height: 1.73 m (5 ft 8 in)
- Beauty pageant titleholder
- Title: Miss Supranational 2017
- Hair color: Dark Brown
- Eye color: Brown
- Major competitions: Miss World Korea 2015 (1st Runner-Up); Miss Universe 2016 (Unplaced) (Best Congeniality); Miss Supranational 2017 (Winner)

Jenny Kim (Korean: 김제니; born November 22, 1993) is a South Korean model and beauty pageant titleholder who was crowned Miss Supranational 2017. She was previously appointed Miss Universe Korea 2016, and competed in Miss Universe 2016.

== Early life and education ==
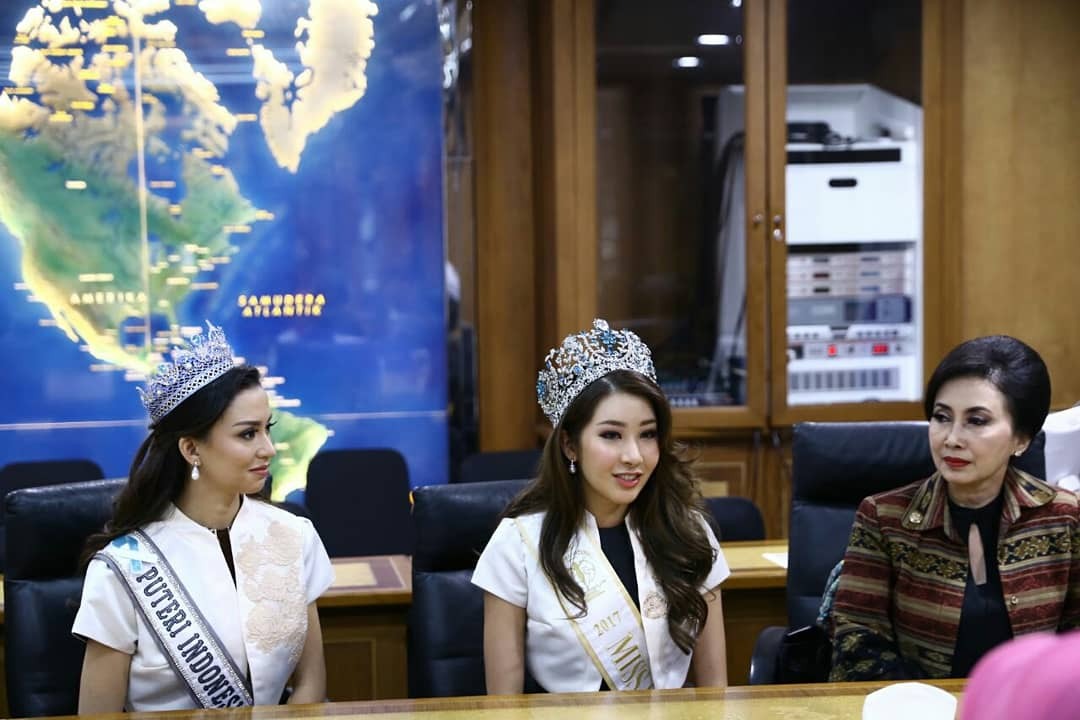
Kim (center) together with Karina Nadila Niab (left) and The Royal Highest Family of Surakarta Sunanate, Princess Putri Kus Wisnu Wardani (right).

Kim was born on November 22, 1993, in Seoul, South Korea. She moved to Indonesia at the age of one with her family, and lived in Jakarta from 1995 until graduating high school in 2013. She was educated in Jakarta Intercultural School and Gandhi Memorial International School in Jakarta for 13 years.

After high school, Kim moved back to Korea to study at Ewha Womans University for a double major in international office administration and English language and literature. She also volunteers to be an interpreter at the National Museum of Indonesia in Jakarta. She speaks Korean, Indonesian, and English.

== Beauty pageants ==
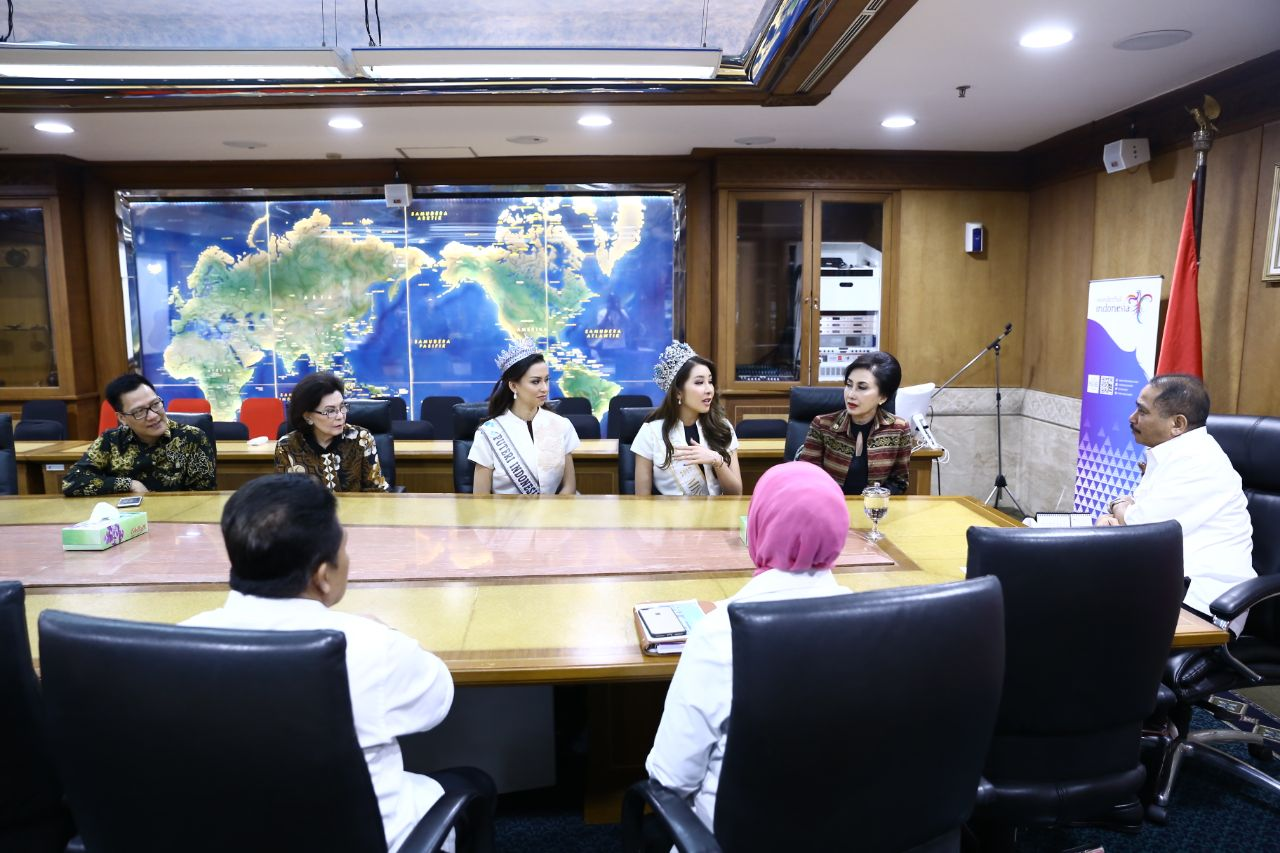
Kim together with Puteri Indonesia Pariwisata 2017 - Karina Nadila Niab at the Ministry of Tourism and Creative Economy of The Republic of Indonesia and Puteri Indonesia Organization Press Conference.

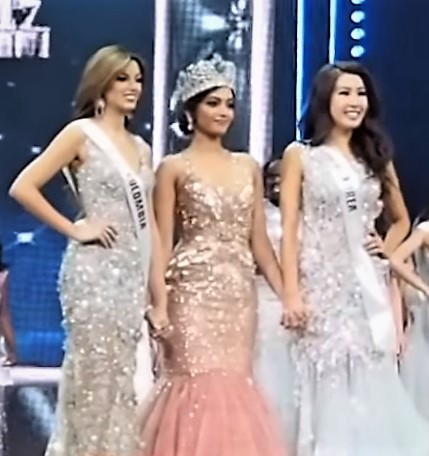
The finals of Miss Supranational 2017. Left to right: Tica Martinez of Colombia, first runner-up; Srinidhi Shetty, reigning Miss Supranational 2016; Jenny Kim of South Korea, Miss Supranational 2017.

Kim believes her greatest strength in pageant competitions is her multiculturalism. She learned the English language in Indonesia, which allowed her to enter international pageants, and credits her high school teacher for encouraging her to compete, even calling her mother until she agreed. She says she has more fans in Indonesia than in Korea. After returning to Korea, she trained for three years in pageant skills such as catwalk, fitness, speech, and makeup.

=== Miss World Korea 2015 ===
Kim's first beauty pageant was Miss World Korea 2015, in December 2015. She won first runner-up to Miriam Wang Hyun.

=== Miss Universe 2016 ===
Kim was appointed Miss Universe Korea 2016 by Park Jeong-ah, national director of Miss Universe Korea. (Winner Wang Hyun went to compete in Miss World 2016.) Kim competed with 85 other contestants at the 65th Miss Universe 2016, where she was awarded Miss Congeniality on January 30, 2017. It was the first time that Korea had received Miss Congeniality at Miss Universe.

=== Miss Supranational 2017 ===
Kim competed at Miss Supranational 2017 which was held in Krynica-Zdrój Poland on December 1. Kim was crowned as the winner by the outgoing titleholder Miss Supranational 2016, Srinidhi Ramesh Shetty. She is the first winner from South Korea and the win is the first major title for her country.

During her reign as Miss Supranational 2017, Kim travelled to Vietnam, China, Japan, Myanmar, Malaysia, India, and Indonesia. She attended Miss Diva 2018 in India, and gave interviews and tips to the contestants. Kim attended the Puteri Indonesia 2018 beauty contest, and served as an honorary judge at Puteri Indonesia 2019. She helped present the International Emmy Kids Awards at the Cannes Film Festival in 2018. She crowned Miss Supranational Vietnam 2018 in Seoul, South Korea.

In November 2018, at the end of her reign as Miss Supranational, all the Miss Supranational contestants in Poland for the December competition threw Kim a 25th birthday party in Karpacz.

Awards and achievements
Preceded by (Seoul) Kim Seo-yeon	Miss Universe Korea; 2016	Succeeded by (Gyeonggi Province) Cho Se-whee
Preceded by (Angola) Whitney Shikongo	Miss Universe Congeniality; 2016	Succeeded by (Egypt) Farah Sedky (Panama) Laura de Sanctis
Preceded by (North Chungcheong Province) Dasol Lee	Miss Supranational Korea; 2017	Succeeded by (Incheon) Lee Eun-bi
Preceded by (India) Srinidhi Shetty	Miss Supranational; 2017	Succeeded by (Puerto Rico) Valeria Vázquez
