= Names of European cities in different languages (U–Z) =

Different names for European cities in neighbouring languages

The names used for some major European cities differ in different European and sometimes non-European languages. In some countries where there are two or more languages spoken, such as Belgium or Switzerland, dual forms may be used within the city itself, for example on signage. This is also the case in Ireland, despite a low level of actual usage of the Irish language. In other cases where a regional language is officially recognised, that form of the name may be used in the region, but not nationally. Examples include the Welsh language in Wales in the United Kingdom, and other languages in parts of Italy and Spain.

There is a slow trend to return to the local name, which has been going on for a long time. In English Livorno is now used, the old English form of Leghorn having become antiquated at least a century ago. In some cases, such as the replacement of Danzig with Gdańsk, the official name has been changed more recently. Since 1995, the government of Ukraine has encouraged the use of Kyiv rather than Kiev.

== U ==
| English name | Other names or former names |
|---|---|
| (Germany) Überlingen | Iberlingen - Иберлинген (Russian, Serbian), Jibrovice (Czech), Überlingen (German, Romanian), Yübólíngēn - 于柏林根/與柏林根 (Mandarin) |
| (Italy) Udine | Baidn (Sappada and Sauris Bavarian German), Bain (Timau Bavarian German), Udin (Friulian*), Ùdin (Piedmontese*), Udine (Bosnian, Croatian*, Dutch*, Finnish*, French*, German*, Hungarian*, Italian*, Lombard*, Romanian*), Udine - Удине (Bulgarian*, Russian*, Serbian*), Udine – უდინე (Georgian*), Udine - Удіне (Ukrainian*), Udine - Удзінэ (Belarusian*), Udine - 우디네 (Korean*), Údine (Portuguese*, Spanish*, Venetian*), Ūdine - ウーディネ (Japanese*), Udīne (Latvian*), Udinė (Lithuanian*), Ūdīneh - اودینه (Persian*), ʼŪdīniyy - أوديني (Arabic*), Udinum (Latin), Utina (Latin), Utinensis (Latin), Utinum (Latin*), Vedinum (Latin), Vidan (historical Slovene), Videm (Czech, Slovene*), Weiden (historic German), Weiden in Friaul (historic German*), Wūdínèi - 乌迪内/烏迪內 (Mandarin*) |
| (Lithuania) Ukmergė | Vilkmergė (Lithuanian, until 1918), Wiłkomierz (Polish), Вількамір (historical Belarusian), Вількомир (historical Ukrainian) |
| (Montenegro) Ulcinj | Dulcigno (Italian), Ulcinj (Bosnian, Croatian, Montenegrin, Serbian, Slovene), Ulciň (Czech, Slovak), Ulqin (Albanian), Ulcinium or Olcinium (Latin), Ülgün (Turkish), Olokénion - Ολοκαίνιον (Greek) |
| (Germany) Ulm | Ulm (Azeri, Dutch, Finnish, German, Romanian, Turkish), Ulma (Italian, Latvian), Ulmas (Lithuanian), Ulmi – ულმი (Georgian*), Wūmǔ - 乌姆/烏姆 (Mandarin) |
| (Russia) Ulyanovsk | Simbirsk (former name in French and German), Symbirsk (former name in Polish) Oulianovsk (French), Ulianovsk (Romanian), Uljanovsk (Finnish, Serbian, Slovene), Uļjanovska (Latvian), Uljanovskas (Lithuanian), Uljanowsk (German, Polish), Ulyanovsk (Azeri), Ulyanovsk - Ульяновск (Russian), Ulyanovsk - Уляновск (Bulgarian), Wūlǐyànuòfūsīkè - 乌里亚诺夫斯克/烏里亞諾夫斯克 (Mandarin) |
| (Croatia) Umag | Umag (Bosnian, Croatian, Slovene, Finnish, Romanian), Umago (Italian, Portuguese), Wūmǎgé - 乌马格/烏馬格 (Mandarin) |
| (Sweden) Umeå | Ubmeje (Ume Sami), Ubmi (Northern Sami), Umeå (Swedish), Upmeje (Southern Sami), Uumaja (Finnish), Umeo (Latvian), Wūméi'ào - 乌梅奥/烏梅奧 (Mandarin) |
| (Sweden) Uppsala | Oupsála - Ουψάλα (Greek), Upsal (French, former German), Uppsala (Danish, Dutch, Finnish, German, Norwegian, Swedish), Uppsalir (Icelandic), Upsala (Azeri, Bosnian, Finnish alternate, Latvian, Romanian, Serbian), Upsala – უფსალა (Georgian*), Upsalia (Latin), Upsália (Portuguese)*, Upsalla - 웁살라 (Korean), Upsalo (Esperanto), Wūpǔsàlā - 乌普萨拉/烏普薩拉 (Mandarin) |
| (Italy) Urtijëi | Urtijëi (Ladin), Ortisei (Italian), St. Ulrich (German), 奥蒂塞伊 (Mandarin) |
| (Netherlands) Utrecht | Traiectum (Latin), Oetrècht/Utrècht (Gronings), Utereg / Uterech (local dialect), Utert (West Frisian), Utrech / Utrei (Limburgish), Utrecht (Afrikaans, Catalan, Croatian, Danish, French, Hungarian, Icelandic, Indonesian, Dutch, English, German, Finnish, Italian, Luxembourgish, Norwegian, Polish, Portuguese, Romanian, Slovene, Spanish, Swedish, Welsh), Utrechtas (Lithuanian), Utrèct (Arpitan*), Utreht - Утрехт (Bulgarian, Russian, Serbian, Ukrainian), Utrehta (Latvian), Utréchti - Ουτρέχτη (Greek), Utreĥto (Esperanto), Utrek (Walloon), Ut'rekht'i – უტრეხტი (Georgian*), Utreque (Portuguese), Utrext (Azeri), Yutorehito - ユトレヒト (Japanese)*, Wūtèláihètè - 乌特莱赫特/烏特萊赫特 (Mandarin) |
| (Ukraine) Uzhhorod | Oujhorod (French), Ugohrad - Уґоград (Rusyn), Ujgorod / Ugocea (Romanian), Ungstadt (German alternate), Ungvár (Hungarian), Ungvir - אונגװיר / Ingver / Yngvyr (Yiddish), Ungwar (German alternate), Uschhorod (German), Uzhgorod - Ужгород (Russian), Uzhhorod - Ужгород (Ukrainian, Rusyn), Uzhhorodi – უჟჰოროდი (Georgian*), Užhorod (Czech, Finnish, Slovak), Użhorod (Polish), Užgoroda (Latvian), Wūzhīhuǒluódé - 乌支火罗德/烏支火羅德 (Mandarin) |

== V ==
| English name | Other names or former names |
|---|---|
| (Finland) Vaasa | Nikolainkaupunki (old Finnish alternate), Nikolaistad (old Swedish alternate), Nikolaistadt (old German alternate), Vaasa (Estonian, Finnish, German), Vasa (Azeri, Swedish), Vasa - Vasa (Bulgarian), Waza (Polish), Vāsa (Latvian), Wǎsà - 瓦萨/瓦薩 (Mandarin) |
| (Liechtenstein) Vaduz | Fadōtsu - ファドーツ (Japanese)*, Paducheu / P'aduch'ŭ - 파두츠 (Korean), Vaduts - Vaduc (Bulgarian, Russian, Ukrainian), Vadutsi – ვადუცი (Georgian*), Vaduz (Finnish, German, Italian, Maltese, Croatian, Serbian, Swedish, Turkish), Vadúz - Βαντούζ (Greek), Vaducas (Lithuanian), Vaduca (Latvian), Wǎdùzī - 瓦杜兹 (Mandarin) |
| (North Macedonia) Valandovo | Valandovo (English, Croatian, Serbian, Slovene), Valandovo (Macedonian), Valantovo - Βαλάντοβο (Greek) |
| (Spain) Valencia | Balansiyah بلنسية (Arabic), Ballensia / Pallensia - 발렌시아 (Korean), Barenshia - バレンシア (Japanese)*, Valence (French), Valencia (Dutch, Finnish, German, Interlingua, Romanian, Croatian, Spanish, Swedish), València (Catalan/Valencian), Valência (Portuguese), Valencija (Slovene), Valencio or Valencujo (Esperanto), Valensia (Ladino), Valensija (Belarusian, Latvian, Lithuanian, Serbian), Valensiya (Azeri, Turkish), Valensiya / Valensija - Валѐнсия (Bulgarian, Russian), Valentía - Βαλεντία (Greek), Valentia (Latin), Valenza (Italian), Walencja (Polish), ভ্যালেন্সি - Bhelenshi (Bengali), Bālúnxīyà - 巴伦西亚/巴倫西亞 (Mandarin) |
| (Estonia) Valga | Balga – 발가 (Korean*), Valga (Estonian*), Valga – Валга (Serbian*), Valga – Վալգա (Armenian*), Valga – ვალგა (Georgian*), Válgka – Βάλγκα (Greek*), Valka (Latvian*), Valqa (Azerbaijani*), Varuga – ヴァルガ (Japanese*), Walk (German*) |
| (Latvia) Valka | Valga (Estonian*), Valka (Latvian*), Walk (German*) |
| (Netherlands) Valkenburg | Valkenburg (Dutch, German), Fauquemont (old French), Fǎ'àokěnbǎo - 法奥肯堡 (Mandarin) |
| (Malta) Valletta | Balleta / Pallet'a - 발레타 (Korean), Baretta - バレッタ (Japanese)*, il-Belt (colloquial Maltese), il-Belt Valletta (Maltese), Fālītā (Arabic), Vaileite (Irish), La Valeta (Bulgarian), La Valeta (Portuguese variant, Spanish), La Valette (French), La Valetta (Romanian, Turkish), La Valletta (Italian, Polish, Slovak), Valet'a – ვალეტა (Georgian*), Valéta - Βαλέτα (Greek), Valeta (Latvian, Lithuanian, Portuguese*), Valetta (Turkish alternate), Valletta (Finnish, German, Swedish), Wǎláitǎ - 瓦莱塔/瓦萊塔 (Mandarin) |
| (Latvia) Valmiera | Valmiera (Latvian, Lithuanian), Wolmar (German) |
| (Finland) Vantaa | Vanda (Swedish), Vanta - Vanta (Bulgarian), Vantaa (Finnish), Vant'aa – ვანტაა (Georgian*) |
| (Bulgaria) Varna | Baruna バルナ (Japanese), Odessos - Ὀδησσός (Ancient Greek), Odessus (Latin), Varna (Albanian, English, French, Indonesian, Italian, Kurdish, Romanian, Uzbek, Vietnamese, Welsh), Varna - Варна (Belarusian, Bulgarian, Kazakh Macedonian, Mongolian, Ukrainian), Varna – ვარნა (Georgian*), Varuna ヴァルナ (Japanese variant), Warna (Polish) |
| (Romania) Vaslui | Vaslui (Romanian), Vaszló (Hungarian) |
| Vatican City | Bachikan - バチカン / Bachikan Shikoku - バチカン市国 (Japanese)*, Batikan si / Pat'ik'an si - 바티칸 시 (Korean), Cathair na Bhatacain (Scottish Gaelic), Cathair na Vatacáine (Irish), Cidade do Vaticano (Portuguese), Cité du Vatican (French), Città del Vaticano (Italian), Ciudad del Vaticano (Spanish), Ciutat del Vaticà (Catalan), Civitas Vaticana (Latin), Dinas y Fatican (Welsh), Fàndìgāng - 梵蒂冈/梵蒂岡 (Mandarin), Fatikaanstêd (Frisian), Sivdad del Vatikano (Ladino), Vaticaanstad (Dutch), Vatikaanikaupunki (Finnish), Vatikan (Azeri, German variant, Maltese, Croatian, Serbian, Turkish), Vatikan - Vatikan (Bulgarian, Russian), Vatikán (Czech, Slovak), Vat'ik'ani – ვატიკანი (Georgian*), Vatikanó - Βατικανό or Póli tu Vatikanú - Πόλη του Βατικανού (Greek), Vatikanstadt (German), Vatikanstaten (Norwegian, Swedish), Vatikánváros (Hungarian), Watykan (Polish), Vatíkanið (Icelandic), Páfagarður (Icelandic alternate), Vatikanas (Lithuanian), ভ্যাটিকান সিটি - Bhetikan Siti (Bengali), Vatikāns (Latvian) |
| (Belarus) Vawkavysk | Ваўкавыск (Belarusian), Wołkowysk (Polish), Волковы́ск (Russian), וואלקאוויסק (Yiddish) |
| (North Macedonia) Veles | Veles (English, Serbian, Croatian, Bosnian), Veles (Macedonian), Velesá - Βελεσά or Vylázora - Βυλάζωρα (Greek), Köprülü (Turkish) |
| (Bulgaria) Veliko Tarnovo | Veliko Tarnovo - Велико Търново (Bulgarian), Tarnovgrad - Търновград (Archaic Bulgarian), Târnova Mare (Archaic Romanian), Tırnova - طرنوه (Ottoman Turkish), Ternobum or Trinovum (Latin), Tövisvár (Archaic Hungarian), Trapézitsa - Τραπέζιτσα (Ancient Greek) |
| (Russia) Veliky Novgorod | Aslă Novgorod - Аслă Новгород (Chuvash), Böyek Novgorod - Бөек Новгород (Tatar), Didysis Naugardas (Lithuanian), Holmgard (Old Norse, archaic in Norwegian), Hólmgarður (Icelandic), Novgorod (former and alternative name), Nóvgorod -Νόβγκοροντ or Méga Nóvgorod - Μέγα Νόβγκοροντ (Greek), Novgorod the Great (alternative name in English), Styr Novgorod - Стыр Новгород (Ossetian), Velikij Novgorod (Danish, Norwegian, Slovak), Veliky Novgorod (English, Welsh), Veļikijnovgoroda (Latvian), Ydžyd Vylʹkar - Ыджыд Вылькар (Komi) |
| (Slovakia) Veľké Kapušany | Nagykapos (Hungarian*), Veljke Kapušani (Serbo-Croatian*), Veljke Kapušani – Вељке Капушани (Serbian*), Veľké Kapušany (Slovak*), Veļke Kapušani (Latvian*) |
| (Slovakia) Veľký Krtíš | Nagykürtös (Hungarian*), Veljki Medjer (Serbo-Croatian*), Velki Krtiş (Azerbaijani*), Veļki Krtīša (Latvian*), Veľký Krtíš (Slovak*), Velky Krtyšas (Lithuanian*) |
| (Slovakia) Veľký Meder | Groß-Magendorf (German*), Nagymegyer (Hungarian*), Veļki Medera (Latvian*), Veľký Meder (Slovak*) |
| (Slovakia) Veľký Šariš | Groß-Scharosch (German*), Nagysáros (Hungarian*), Veļki Šariša (Latvian*), Veľký Šariš (Slovak*), Wielki Szarysz (Polish*) |
| (Italy) Venice | Benátky (Czech*, Slovak), Benechia - ベネチア (Japanese)*, Benechia / Penech'ia - 베네치아 (Korean), Benetke (Slovene), al-Bunduqīya - البندقية (Arabic)*, Enetía - Ενετία (Katharevousa Greek), Feneesje (Frisian), Feneyjar (Icelandic), Fenis (Welsh), Mleci (older Croatian*), Vaniescha (Romansh), An Veinéis (Irish), Velence (Hungarian)*, Venècia (Catalan)*, Venecia (Spanish)*, Venēcija (Latvian)*, Venecija (Croatian*, Lithuanian), Venecija - Venecija (Macedonian*, Serbian*), Mлеци - Mleci (older Serbian*), Veneciya - Venecija (Bulgarian*, Russian*), Veneciya - Venecija (Ukrainian)*, Veneco (Esperanto), Venedig (Danish*, German*, Swedish*), Venedik (Turkish)*, Venesia (Venetian*, Ladino, Indonesian*), Veneetsia (Estonian), Venetía - Βενετία (Greek), Veneţia (Romanian)*, Venesië (Afrikaans)*, Venetië (Dutch)*, Venetik (Armenian), Venetsia (Finnish)*, Venetsia – ვენეცია (Georgian*), Veneza (Portuguese)*, Venezia (Italian*, Norwegian*), Venezja (Maltese), Vènisa (Arpitan*), Venise (French)*, Venetsye - װענעציע (Yiddish), Wēinísī - 威尼斯 (Mandarin)*, Wenecja (Polish)*, Venetië / Venies (Limburgish), Vignesie (Friulian), Unieja (Ladin) |
| (Italy) Ventimiglia | Album Intemelium / Intimelia (Latin), Ventimiglia (Italian), Vintimille (French) |
| (Italy) Vercelli | Vërsèj (Piedmontese), Varsej (Vercellese dialect of Piedmontese), Verceil (French) |
| (France) Verdun | Verdun (Dutch, French, Romanian), Verdum (Catalan), Verdún (Spanish), Wirten or Verden (Maas) (former German)*, Verdenas (Lithuanian), Fán'ěrdēng - 凡尔登/凡爾登 (Mandarin) |
| (Italy) Verona | Bern (old German), Berona / Perona - 베로나 (Korean), Berōna - ベローナ (Japanese)*, Verona (Azeri, Catalan, Dutch, Finnish, German, Italian, Hungarian, Latin, Latvian, Lithuanian, Maltese, Romanian, Spanish, Venetian*), Verona - Verona (Bulgarian), Vérone (French), Werona (Polish), Veróna - Βερόνα (Greek), Wéiluónà - 维罗纳/維羅納 (Mandarin) |
| (France) Versailles | Berusaiyu - ベルサイユ (Japanese)*, Versaglia (old Italian), Versailles (French), Versalir (Icelandic), Versalhes (Portuguese), Versalia (Latin alternate), Versaliae (Latin), Versalis (Lithuanian), Versalles (Catalan, Spanish), Versay - Versaj (Bulgarian), Versay (Turkish), Wersal (Polish), Versalliés - Βερσαλλίες (Greek), Versaļa (Latvian) |
| (Belgium) Verviers | Velwisch (archaic German), Verv (Azerbaijani*), Vervî (Walloon*), Vervia (Latin*), Verviers (French*, German*), Vervje – Вервје (Serbian*), Vervjė (Lithuanian*), Vervjē (Latvian*) |
| (Belgium) Veurne | Furna (Latin*), Furnes (French*, Occitan*), Veurn (West Flemish*), Veurne (Dutch*), Veurnė (Lithuanian) |
| (Italy) Vicenza | Bichencha - 비첸차 (Korean*), Bissèntzia (Sardinian*), Cimbria (historic German, historic Italian), Fītšanzā - فيتشنزا (Arabic*) Vicence (French*), Vicença (Occitan*), Vicensa (Venetian*), Vicènsa (Lombard*), Vicenza (German*, Italian*), Vicenze (Friulian*), Vicetia (Latin*), Vičenca (Latvian*, Lithuanian*), Vičenca - Виченца (Bulgarian*, Russian*, Serbian*), Vičenca - Віченца (Ukrainian), Vīčenzā - ویچنزا (Persian), Vichentsa - ヴィチェンツァ (Japanese*), Vincentia (Latin), Wéiqínchá - 維琴察 (Mandarin Chinese*), Wiesenthein (historic German*) |
| (Bulgaria) Vidin | Видин (Bulgarian), Diiu (Romanian), Dunonia (Celtic), Widdin (Archaic English), Bodony (Archaic Hungarian), Bononia (Latin), Vidínio - Βιδίνιο (Greek) |
| (Austria) Vienna | Beč (Croatian, Serbian, older Bulgarian), Beç (older Turkish)*, Bech or Vidnya (Romani), Bécs (Hungarian)*, Bin / Pin - 빈 (Korean), Dunaj (Slovene)*, Fienna (Welsh), Ouindóbona - Οὐινδόβονα (Ancient Greek), Vedunia (Celtic), Vena – ვენა (Georgian*), Vyena - Вена (Russian), Vídeň (Czech)*, Viden' / Videň (Ukrainian)*, Viedeň (Slovak), Viên (Vietnamese), Viena / Vijena/ Виена (Belarusian, Bulgarian, Macedonian), Viena (Catalan*, Lithuanian, Portuguese*, Romanian*, Spanish*, Tagalog*), Viène (Arpitan*), Vienna (Italian)*, Vienne (French)*, Viénni - Βιέννη (Greek), Vieno (Esperanto), Viin (Estonian), Vin - װין (Yiddish), Vín (Irish, Icelandic), Vina - וינה (Hebrew), Vínarborg (Icelandic variant), Vindobona (Latin), Vīne (Latvian)*, Viyana (Turkish)*, Vjenë (Albanian), Vjenna (Maltese), Vyana (Azeri), Wean (local Viennese, Austrian and Bavarian dialects)*, Weiyena - 維也納 (Chinese)*, Wene (Afrikaans), Wenen (Dutch*, Frisian*), Wiedeń (Polish)*, Wien (Danish*, Finnish*, German*, Norwegian*, Swedish*), Wīn - ウィーン (Japanese)*, Wina (Indonesian), فيينا (Arabic), وين (Persian) |
| (France) Vienne | Vienna (Allobrogium) (Latin), Viena (Portuguese)*, Viena del Delfinat (Catalan), Vienna nel Delfinato (Italian), Vienne (French) |
| (Belarus) Vileyka | Vileika (Lithuanian), Vilejka - Vilejka (Belarusian), Vilejka - Vilejka (Russian), Wilejka (German, Polish) |
| (Sweden) Vilhelmina | Vilhelmina (Swedish), Vualtjere (Southern Sami) |
| (Estonia) Viljandi | Fellin (former German), Felloin (former French), Viliandi – ვილიანდი (Georgian*), Viljandi (Estonian, Finnish, German, Swedish), Vīlande (Latvian) |
| (Austria) Villach | Bělák (Czech), Beljak (Slovene)*, Bilachium (Latin), Billaheu / Pillahŭ - 빌라흐 (Korean), Filah (Serbian),Villach (German, Croatian), Villaco (Italian)* |
| (Lithuania) Vilnius | Billyuseu / Pillyusŭ - 빌뉴스 (Korean), Birinyusu - ビリニュス (Japanese)*, Filniyūs (Arabic), Vėlnios (Samogitian), Vilnias (Irish), Vilna (Italian old fashion, older Croatian, Spanish, Slovene, Finnish, old Romanian variant, English until 1945), Vilne - װילנע (Yiddish), Vilnius (Catalan, Dutch, French, Italian, Lithuanian, Norwegian, Portuguese variant, Romanian, Swedish, Turkish), Vílnius (Portuguese)*, Vilniusi – ვილნიუსი (Georgian*), Viļņa (Latvian, old Portuguese), Vilnia - Viľňa (Belarusian), Vilnyus (Azeri), Vilnyus - Vilňus (Bulgarian), Vil'njus - Viľňus (Russian, Ukrainian), Vilnjus (Maltese, Serbian), Vilno (Czech, Esperanto), Vil'no - Viľno (Russian, obsolete), Wilnioes (Dutch alternate), Wilna (Dutch old-fashioned, German), Wilno (Polish), Vílna - Βίλνα (Greek) |
| (Belgium) Vilvoorde | Filford (archaic English), Vilvoorde (Dutch*), Vilvôr (Walloon), Vilvorde (Azerbaijani, French*, Latvian*, Silesian*), Vilvorde – Вилворде (Serbian*), Vilvordė (Lithuanian*), Vilvordia (Latin*) |
| (Spain) Vinaròs | Benī al-ʿArūs – بيني الأروس (Arabic), Bynalaroç (Old Catalan), Vinaròs (Catalan), Vinaroz (Spanish, Aragonese) |
| (Sweden) Vindeln | Vindeln (Swedish), Vudtele (Southern Sami), Vyöddale (Ume Sami) |
| (North Macedonia) Vinica | Vinica (English, Croatian), Vinica (Macedonian, Serbian) |
| (Croatia) Vinkovci | Cibalie (Latin), Vinkovce (Hungarian) |
| (Ukraine) Vinnytsia | Вінниця (Ukrainian), Винница (Russian), Вінніцкая (Belarusian), Winnica (Polish), Vinycia (Lithuanian), װיניצע (Vinitse) (Yiddish) |
| (Ukraine) Vynohradiv | Nagyszőlős (Hungarian), Vinohradiv - Vinohradiv (Ukrainian), Winogradów (Polish) |
| (Belgium) Virton | Vertunum (Latin), Viertån (Lorrain), Vierton (Walloon*) Virton (French*) |
| (Sweden) Visby | Visby (Swedish, German alternate), Wisby (German), Visbija (Latvian) |
| (Belgium) Visé | Visé (French*), Visetum (Latin*) Vizé (Walloon*), Wesent (German*), Wezet (Dutch*, Zeelandic*) |
| (Spain) Vitoria | Gasteiz (Basque), Vitoria (Dutch, German, Romanian, Spanish), Vitória (Portuguese), Vitòria (Catalan), Vitorija (Lithuanian) |
| (Belarus) Vitsyebsk | Viciebsk / Vitsyebsk - Vicebsk (Belarusian), Vitebsk (Azeri, Dutch alternate, French, Romanian), Vitebsk - Vitebsk (Russian), Vitebsk - װיטעבסק (Yiddish), Vitebska (Latvian), Vitebskas (Lithuanian), Witebsk (Dutch alternate, German, Polish) |
| (Russia) Vladikavkaz | Dzaudzhikau - Дзауджика́у (former name 1944–1954), Ordzhonikidze - Орджоники́дзе (former name 1932–1944 and 1954–1990), Uładzikaŭkaz - Уладзікаўказ (Belarusian), Vladicáucaso (Spanish, obsolete), Vladikaukāza (Latvian), Vladikaukazas (Lithuanian), Vladikavkaz - Владикавка́з (Bulgarian, Russian), Vladiqafqaz (Azeri), Władykaukaz (Polish), Dzæwdžyqæw - Дзæуджыхъæу (Ossetian) |
| (Albania) Vlorë | Aulon (Latin), Avlónas - Αυλώνας (Greek)*, Avlona (Italian alternate), Avlonya (Turkish)*, Flora (Croatian, Serbian), Valona (English alternate, Italian*), Valona - Valona (Croatian, Serbian), Vlorë / Vlora (Albanian)*, Vlora (German)*, Vlyora - Vl’ora (Bulgarian*, Ukrainian*), Vlyora - Vlera (Russian)* |
| (Croatia) Vodnjan | Vodnjan (Croatian), Dignano (Italian) |
| (Ukraine) Volodymyr | Lodymyr - Лодимиръ (historic Ukrainian), Ludmir - לודמיר (Yiddish), Uładzimier - Уладзімер (Belarusian), Vladimir - Владимир (Bulgarian, Russian), Vladimir-Volynsky - Владимир-Волынский (alternate Russian), Volodimir - Володимир (Serbian), Volodımır (Crimean Tatar, Turkish), Volodîmîr (Romanian), Volodymyr - Володимир (Ukrainian), Volodymyr-Volynskyi - Володимир-Волинський (former Ukrainian), Volodymyr (Czech, English, French, Italian, Slovak), Volodymyras (Lithuanian), Włodzimierz (Polish), Włodzimierz Wołyński (former Polish), Wolodymyr (German) |
| (Russia) Volgograd | Ahş - Аһш (Kalmyk), Carycyn (former Polish), Čarhuli - Чархули (Chuvash), Sarısu - Сарысу (alternative name in Tatar)*, Stalingrad (former name 1925–1961), Tsaritsyn (former name), Volgograd - Волгоград (Bulgarian, Russian, Tatar), Volgograd (Croatian, Romanian, Serbian, Slovene, Turkish), Volgográd (Hungarian), Volgogrado (Italian, Portuguese, Spanish), Wolgograd (Afrikaans, Dutch, German), Estalinegrado (former Portuguese), Estalingrado (former Spanish), Stalingrado (former Italian), Volgograda (Latvian), Volgogradas (Lithuanian), Wołgograd (Polish) |
| (Slovakia) Vráble | Verebély (Hungarian*), Vráble (Slovak*), Vrablje (Serbo-Croatian*) |
| (Slovakia) Vranov nad Topľou | Frö(h)nel an der Töpl (alternative German), Varannó (Hungarian*), Vranov nad Topľou (Slovak*), Vranov nad Toplyou (Azerbaijani*), Vranov na Toploj (Serbo-Croatian*), Vranov na Toploj – Вранов на Топлој (Serbian*), Vranova pie Topļas (Latvian*), Vranovas prie Toplios (Lithuanian*), Vronau an der Töpl (German*) |
| (Slovakia) Vrbové | Verbó (Hungarian*), Vrbau (archaic German), Vrbové (Slovak*), Vrbovje – Врбовје (Serbain*), Werbau (German*) |
| (Slovakia) Vrútky | Ruttek (German*), Ruttka (Hungarian*), Vrūtkai (Lithuanian*), Vrūtki (Latvian*), Vrutki – Врутки (Serbian*), Vrútky (Slovak*) |
| (Russia) Vyborg | Viiburi (Estonian), Viipuri (Finnish), Viborg - Виборг (Bulgarian), Viborg (Dutch, Romanian, Swedish), Viborga (Latvian), Vīpuri (former Latvian), Wiburg (German), Vyborg - Выборг (Russian), Wyborg (Polish) |
| (Slovakia) Vysoké Tatry | Magastátra (Hungarian*), Visoke Tatrai (Lithuanian*), Visoke Tatre (Serbo-Croatian*), Visoke Tatri (Latvian*), Vysoké Tatry (Slovak*), Wysokie Tatry (Polish*) |

== W ==
| English name | Other names or former names |
|---|---|
| (Poland) Wałbrzych | Valbžiha (Latvian), Wałbrzych (Polish), Waldenburg (German) |
| (Belgium) Walcourt | Villa Walcortensis (Latin*), Walcoû (Walloon*), Walcourt (French*) |
| (Germany) Wangen | Vanky (Czech), Wangen (German) |
| (Belgium) Waregem | Varegem – Варегем (Serbian*), Varegema (Latvian*), Varegemas (Lithuanian*), Waregem (Dutch*), Waoregem (Zeelandic*), Woaregem (West Flemish*) |
| (Belgium) Waremme | Borgworm (Dutch*), Wareme (Walloon*), Waremia (Latin), Waremme (French*), Wèrm (Limburgish*) |
| (Poland) Warsaw | Bareusyaba / Parŭsyaba - 바르샤바 (Korean), Vársá (Irish), Varšava (Bosnian, Latvian, Czech, Croatian, Slovak, Slovene), - Варшава (Bulgarian, Belarusian, Macedonian, Russian, Serbian, Ukrainian), Varşava (Azeri), Varsavia (Italian), ورشو = Varsho (Persian), Varsavja (Maltese), Varshava (Armenian), Varshava – ვარშავა (Georgian*), Varshe - װאַרשע (Yiddish), Varsjava (Faroese), Varsjá (Icelandic), Varsó (Hungarian), Varsova (Finnish), Varşova (Turkish), Varsovia (Latin, Romansh, Spanish, Tagalog*), Varsovía - Βαρσοβία (Greek), Varsóvia (Portuguese), Varsòvia (Catalan), Varşovia (Romanian), Varsovie (Arpitan*, French), Varsovio (Esperanto), Varssavi (Estonian), Varšuva (Lithuanian), Warsawa (Indonesian), Waršawa (Sorbian), Warschau (Dutch, German), Warsjau (Frisian), Warskou (Afrikaans), Wārsū (Arabic), Warszawa (Danish, Polish, Swedish), Warushawa - ワルシャワ (Japanese)*, 華沙 (Chinese), Varsha - ורשה (Hebrew), ওয়ারশ - Oyarsh (Bengali) |
| (Republic of Ireland) Waterford | Port Láirge (Irish), Port Làirge (Scottish Gaelic), Vaterfjord / Veðrafjǫrðr (Old Norse), Woteopeodeu / Wŏt'ŏp'ŏdŭ - 워터퍼드 (Korean*), Voterfordas (Lithuanian), ওয়াটারফোর্ড - Oyatarfurd (Bengali) |
| (Belgium) Wavre | Auve (Picard*), Åve-el-Roman-Payis (Walloon*), Vavr – Вавр (Serbian*), Vavra (Latvian*), Vavras (Lithuanian*), Waver (Afrikaans*, Dutch*), Waover (Zeelandic*), Wavria (Latin*), Wavre (French*) |
| (Germany) Weimar | Baimareu / Paimarŭ - 바이마르 (Korean*), Vaïmári - Βαϊμάρη (Greek), Vajmar - Vajmar (Bosnian, Bulgarian), Veimāra (Latvian), Veimaras (Lithuanian), Výmar or Vejmar (Czech), Weimar (Indonesian, Dutch, German, Italian, Romanian) |
| (Poland) Wejherowo | Neustadt in Westpreußen/Neustadt bei Danzig (German), Wejherowo (Polish), Wejherowska Wola (former name), Wejrowò (Kashubian) |
| (Belgium) Wervik | Vervikas (Lithuanian), Viroviacum (Latin*), Wervicq (French*), Wervik (Dutch*, West Flemish*) |
| (Germany) Wetzlar | Becheullareu / Pech'ŭllarŭ - 베츨라르 (Korean*), Veclāra (Latvian), Veclaras (Lithuanian), Weslår (Walloon), Vétclar (Slovene), Wetzlaria (Latin), Veclaro (Esperanto) |
| (Republic of Ireland) Wexford | Loch Garman (Irish), Menapia (Latin), Veisafjǫrðr / Waes Fiord (Old Norse), Veksfordas (Lithuanian), ওয়েক্সফোর্ড - Oyekshfurd (Bengali) |
| (Republic of Ireland) Wicklow | Cill Mhantáin (Irish), Vikinglow / Wykynlo (Old Norse), উইকলো - Uiklo (Bengali) |
| (United Kingdom) (England) Winchester | Caerwynt (Welsh), Venta Belgarum (Latin), Vinčester (Bosnian, Serbian), Vinčesteris (Lithuanian), উইনচেস্টার - Uincheshtar or রাইফেল্বিশেষ - Raifelbisheshh (Bengali) |
| (France) Wissembourg | Weißenburg im Elsass (former German)*, Wissembourg (French*, German*) |
| (Poland) Włocławek | Vuwotsuwaveku - ヴウォツワヴェク (Japanese), Futswaff - فوتسوافك (Arabic), Ladiszló (former Hungarian), Leslau (German, old name), Ulatslavak - Улацлавак (Belarusian), Vloclaveka (Latvian), Vloclavekas (Lithuanian), Vlotslavek - Влоцлавек (Bulgarian, Serbian, Russian), Watsawook - ووتس‌واوک (Persian), Włocławek (Polish) |
| (Germany) Wolgast | Wolgast (Dutch, German), Wołogoszcz (Polish) |
| (United Kingdom) (England) Worcester | Caerwrangon (Welsh), Vigornia (Latin*), Vorčester (Bosnian, Serbian), Vorčesteris (Lithuanian), Weogorna Ceastre (Old English), Wǔsītè - 伍斯特 (Chinese) ওরসেসটার - Orsheshtar (Bengali) |
| (Germany) Worms | Boreumseu / Porŭmsŭ - 보름스 (Korean), Vermayze - װערמײַזע (Yiddish), Vormácia (old Portuguese)*, Vormatía - Βορματία (Greek - καθαρεύουσα), Vormsa (Latvian), Wormacja (Polish), Wormazia (former Italian), Worms (Dutch, German, Italian, Romanian), Vormsas (Lithuanian) |
| (United Kingdom) (Wales) Wrexham | Wrecsam (Welsh) |
| (Poland) Wrocław | Beurocheuwapeu / Pŭroch'ŭwap'ŭ – 브로츠와프 (Korean*), Bhrotśōẇaph – ভ্রৎসওয়াফ (Bengali), Boroszló (Hungarian),^{[KNAB]} Braslavia (old Romanian), Brassel (Silesian German), Breslá (Icelandic), Breslau (Catalan*, former Danish, former Dutch, former English, German,^{[KNAB]} former Norwegian, former Romanian, former Swedish), Breslava (former Latvian),^{[KNAB]} Breslavia (Italian*,^{[KNAB]} Spanish*, Tagalog*), Breslávia (Portuguese*), Breslavʼl – Бреславль (former Russian),^{[KNAB]} Bresle – ברעסלע (Yiddish), Bresloy – ברעסלוי (Yiddish), Bùléisīláo – 布雷斯勞 (former Mandarin Chinese), Frūtzuwāf – فروتسواف (Arabic*), Fúluócíwǎfū – 弗羅茨瓦夫 (Mandarin Chinese*), Gruß Brassel (Silesian German), Urocłaŭ – Вроцлаў (Belarusian), Vratislav (Czech,^{[KNAB]} Slovak^{[KNAB]}) Vratislavˮ – Вратиславъ (archaic Russian),^{[KNAB]} Vratislava (archaic Croatian), Vratislavia / Vratislaviensis / Wratislavia / Wracislavia (Latin), Vratislavie (French), Vroclav (Slovene*), Vroclav - Вроцлав (Bosnian, Bulgarian, Russian*,^{[KNAB]} Serbian), Vroclava (Latvian),^{[KNAB]} Vroclavas (Lithuanian),^{[KNAB]} Vroclavo (Esperanto), Vrotsvâf – وروتسواف (Persian*), Vrotzlav – ורוצלב (Hebrew), Vurotsuwafu – ヴロツワフ (Japanese*), Wroclaw (Catalan, Finnish, Romanian, Slovene), Wrocław (Cashubian*, Croatian, Lower Sorbian*, Polish, Swedish, Upper Silesian*), Wrócław (Upper Sorbian*) |
| (Germany) Würzburg | Bwireucheubureukeu / Pwirŭch'ŭburŭk'ŭ - 뷔르츠부르크 (Korean*), Herbipolis (Latin), Vurzburgo (Portuguese variant)*, Wörzborg (Low Saxon), Wurzbourg (French), Wurtzburg (Catalan), Wurtzburgo (Portuguese variant)*, Würzburg (Dutch, German, Romanian), Wurzburgo (Spanish), Vircburga (Latvian) |

== X ==
| English name | Other names or former names |
|---|---|
| (Germany) Xanten | Santen (Low Rhenish), Xanten (German), Xantum (Latin*) |
| (Greece) Xanthi | Xánthi - Ξάνθη (Greek), İskeçe (Turkish), Skeča - Скеча / Skeče - Скече / Ksanti - Ксанти (Bulgarian) |

== Y ==
| English name | Other names or former names |
|---|---|
| (Ukraine) / (Autonomous Republic of Crimea) Yalta | Ialta (Portuguese, Romanian), Jalta (Catalan, Croatian, Czech, Finnish, German, Hungarian, Latvian, Lithuanian, Maltese, Slovak, Serbian, Swedish), Jałta (Polish), Yalta (Azeri, Crimean Tatar, Irish, Italian, Spanish, Turkish), Yalta - Ялта (Bulgarian, Russian, Ukrainian*), Yalta / Yalt'a - 얄타 (Korean), Yaruta - ヤルタ (Japanese)*, יאלטה (Hebrew), Յալթա (Armenian) |
| (Armenia) Yerevan | Èrèvan (Arpitan*), Jerevani (Albanian), Yirifan - يريفان (Arabic), Yerevan - Երևան (Armenian), İrəvan (Azerbaijani), Jerevan (Czech, Danish, Dutch, Estonian, Luxembourgish, Swedish), Erevan (French, Catalan, Corsican), Erevani - ერევანი (Georgian*), Erivan (Turkish), Eriwan (German), Ereván - Ερεβάν (Greek), Yérévvān - ירוואן (Hebrew), Jereván (Hungarian), エレバン (Japanese), 예레반 (Korean), Erevāna (Latvian), Jerevanas (Lithuanian), Iravān - ایروان (Persian), Erywań (Polish), Erevan - Ереван (Bulgarian, Kazakh, Kyrgyz, Macedonian, Tajik), Yerevan - Ереван (Russian), Yeryevan - Ереван (Mongolian), Jerevan - Јереван (Serbian), Ereván (Spanish), Yere Wān - เยเรวาน (Thai) |
| (Ukraine) / (Autonomous Republic of Crimea) Yevpatoria | Eupatoria (Latin, Polish*, Romanian*, Spanish), Evpatoría - Ευπατορία (Greek), Evpatorya (Turkish)*, Gözlöve or Gözleve (older Turkish)*, Jevpatorija (Finnish), Kerkinítis - Κερκινίτις (Greek variant), Kezlev (Crimean Tatar)*, Kozłów (older Polish)*, Yevpatoria - Եվպատորիա (Armenian), Yevpatoriya - Евпатория (Russian)*, Yevpatoriya - Євпаторія (Ukrainian)*, Eipatorija (Latvian) |
| (United Kingdom) (England) York | Caerefrog / Efrog (Welsh), Eabhrac (Irish), Eabhraig (Scottish Gaelic), Eboracum (Latin), Efrawg (Breton, Cornish), Everwyk or Everwich (Old English), Evórakon - Εβόρακον (Greek - καθαρεύουσα), Evrok (Cornish), Iorc (Catalan), Iorque (Portuguese), Jorvik (ancient Scandinavian), Jórvík (Icelandic, Old Norse), Jórk (Old Norse), Jork (Bosnian, Polish), Jork - Јорк (Macedonian, Serbian), Jorko (Esperanto), Jorka (Latvian), Jorkas (Lithuanian), Yokeu / Yok'ŭ - 요크 (Korean), York (Azeri, Croatian, Italian, Slovene), York - Йорк (Russian), Yórki - Υόρκη (Greek), 約克 (Chinese), יורק (Hebrew) |
| (Belgium) Ypres | Hyprae (Latin*), Ieper (Dutch*), Iper (Western Frisian*), Îper (Walloon*), Ipr (Uzbek*), Ipr – Ипр (Serbian*), Ipra (Latvian*), Ipras (Lithuanian*), Ipres (Portuguese*), Iprés (Spanish*), Ipro (Esperanto*, Italian*), Ypres (Basque*, Croatian*, French*, Hungarian*, Ido*, Irish*, Lombard*, Occitan*, Romanian*, Swahili*, Turkish*, Vietnamese*, Waray*), Yper (West Flemish*), Yperen (Swedish*), Ypern (Alemannic*, German*), Ypry (Czech*) |

== Z ==
| English name | Other names or former names |
|---|---|
| (Poland) Zabrze | Hindenburg (German 1915–1945), Zabrze (Polish), Zabujei - ザブジェイ (Japanese)* |
| (Croatia) Zadar | Diadora (Romanian), Iader (Latin, Liburnian), Ídassa - Ίδασσα (Greek), Jadareu / Chadarŭ - 자다르 (Korean*), Zadar (Croatian, Polish, Serbian, Slovak, Slovene), Zadara (Latvian), Zadaras (Lithuanian), Zára (Hungarian), Zara (Italian, Portuguese), Zarje (Chakavian, early Croat), Jadres (French) |
| (Croatia) Zagreb | Agram (former German and Russian), Ágranon - Άγρανον (Greek - καθαρεύουσα), Zagrabia (Latin), Agranum (former Latin name), Jageurebeu / Chagŭrebŭ - 자그레브 (Korean), Sagelebu (simplified Chinese: 萨格勒布; traditional Chinese: 薩格勒布; pinyin: Sàgélèbù; Jyutping: Saat3 gaak3 laak6 bou3), Ságrab (Irish), Zagabria (Italian), Zágráb (Hungarian), Zagreb (Asturian, Indonesian, Malay, Croatian, Finnish, French, German, Norwegian, Portuguese, Romanian, Russian, Serbian, Slovene, Spanish, Swedish), Zagreb - Загреб (Bulgarian, Macedonian, Serbian), Żagreb (Maltese, Chakavian), Zagreba (Latvian), Zagrebas (Lithuanian), Zagrebe (Portuguese), Zagrèbe (Arpitan*), Zagrebi – ზაგრები (Georgian*), Zagrebo (Esperanto), Zagrep (Turkish, Kaykavian), Zaġrib - زغرب (Arabic), Zagrzeb (Polish), Zāgreb - زاگرب (Persian), Záhřeb (Czech), Záhreb (Slovak), Zahreb - Загреб (Ukrainian), Zagurebu - ザグレブ (Japanese)*, জাগরেব - Jagreb (Bengali), זגרב (Hebrew) |
| (Czech Republic) Zákupy | Reichstadt (German)*, Zákupy (Czech)* |
| (Spain) Zaragoza | Caesaraugusta (Latin), Saragoça (Portuguese), Saragosa - 사라고사 (Korean), Saragosa (Ladino*, Latvian, Serbian, Slovene), Saragossa (English [US], Arpitan, Catalan, German, Polish), Saragosse (French), Saragozza (Italian), Sarqasta - سرقسطة (Arabic), Zaragoza (Aragonese, Czech, English [UK], Finnish, Romanian, Spanish, Swedish, Turkish), Saragosa - Сарагоса (Bulgarian, Russian), Saragosa - サラゴサ (Japanese)*, জারাগোজা - Jaraguja (Bengali) |
| (Slovakia) Žarnovica | Scharnowitz (German*), Žarnovica (Slovak*), Zsarnóca (Hungarian*) |
| (Slovakia) Želiezovce | Želiezovce (Slovak*), Zelis (German*), Željezovce (Latvian*), Zselíz (Hungarian*) |
| (Switzerland) Zermatt | Praborgne (French) |
| (Ukraine) Zhytomyr | Jitomir (Romanian), Jitomireu / Chit'omirŭ - 지토미르 (Korean*), Jytomyr (French), Schytomyr (German), Žitomir - Житомир (Bulgarian, Russian), Zhitomir - זשיטאָמיר (Yiddish), Žytomyr - Житомир (Ukrainian), Żytomierz (Polish), Žytomir - Жытомір (Belarusian), Žytomyr (Finnish) |
| (Slovakia) Žiar nad Hronom | Garamszentkereszt (Hungarian*), Heiligenkreuz (an der Gran) (German*), Jiar nad Hronom (Azerbaijani*), Žiar nad Hronom (Slovak*), Žara pie Hronas (Latvian*), Žiaras prie Hrono (Lithuanian*) |
| (Poland) Zielona Góra | Grünberg (German), Mons Viridis (Latin), Zielona Góra (Polish) |
| (Germany) Zittau | Žitava (Czech, Slovak), Zittau (Dutch, German), Żytawa (Polish) |
| (Slovakia) Žilina | Silina (Northern Frisian*), Sillein (German*), Jilinа (Azerbaijani*), Jillina / Jil'li'na – 질리나 (Korean*), Solna (Latin*), Žilina (Slovak*), Žilina – Жилина (Bulgarian*, Russian*, Serbian*), Żylina (Polish*), Zsolna (Hungarian*), Z'ylnh – ז'ילינה (Hebrew*) |
| (Slovakia) Zlaté Moravce | Aranyosmarót (Hungarian*), Goldmorawitz (German*), Jeullatemorauche – 즐라테모라우체 (Korean*), Zlaté Moravce (Slovak*), Zlate Moravtse (Azerbaijani*), Zlat'e-Moravtse – ზლატე-მორავცე (Georgian), Zlate-Moravtze – Златэ-Моравцэ (Moksha), Zuratē Morawetse – ズラテー・モラウェツェ (Japanese) |
| (Czech Republic) Zlín | Gottwaldov (former name), Zlín (Czech, Slovak), Zlini – ზლინი (Georgian*) |
| (Russia) Znamensk | Vėluva (Lithuanian), Wehlau (German), Welawa (Polish), Znamensk (Russian) |
| (Czech Republic) Znojmo | Znaim (German), Znojmo (Czech, Polish, Slovak) |
| (Ukraine) Zolochiv | Jollochiu / Cholloch'iu - 졸로치우 (Korean)*, Złoczew or Złoczów (Polish), Zlotshev / Zlotchov - זלאָטשעװ / זלאָטשאָוו (Yiddish), Zoločev - Золочев (Russian), Zoločiv - Золочів (Ukrainian) |
| (Belgium) Zottegem | Sotteghem (archaic English), Zotegemas (Lithuanian), Zottegem (Dutch*) |
| (Belgium) Zoutleeuw | Léau (French*), Leevia (Latin), Liejef (Limburgish*), Zoutleeuw (Dutch*), Zoutliyon (Walloon) |
| (Serbia) Zrenjanin | Becicherecu Mare (Romanian), Großbetschkerek (German), Nagybecskerek (Hungarian) |
| (Switzerland) Zug | Chukeu / Ch'uk'ŭ - 추크 (Korean)*, Tsougue (Arpitan), Zoug (French alternate), Zug (Dutch, German, Romansh), Zugo (Italian) |
| (Switzerland) Zürich | Chūrih(h)i - チューリ(ッ)ヒ (Japanese)*, Chwirihi / Ch'wirihi - 취리히 (Korean), Cirih - Цирих (Serbian), Cīrihe (Latvian), Ciūrichas (Lithuanian), Ciurych - Цюрых (Belarusian), Curiĥo (Esperanto), Curych (Czech), Cürik (old Hungarian), Sūlíshì - 蘇黎世 (Chinese), Tigurum (medieval Latin), Tsiurikhi – ციურიხი (Georgian*), Tsurique (Arpitan*), Tsyurih - Цюрих (Bulgarian, Russian Ukrainian), Turicum (Latin), Turitg (Romansh), Zurich (French), Zürich (Croatian, Dutch, Estonian, German, Finnish, Hungarian, Romanian, Slovene, Swedish), Sürix, Zürix (Azeri), Zúrich (Spanish), Zurigo (Italian), Zürih (Turkish), Zūrīk (Arabic), Zurique (Portuguese), Zurych (Polish), Zūrikh - زوریخ (Persian), Zyríchi - Ζυρίχη (Greek), Zyrih (Albanian), Tzirich - ציריך (Hebrew), জুরিখ - Jurikh (Bengali) |
| (Slovakia) Zvolen | Altsohl (German*), Zólyom (Hungarian*), Zvolen (Slovak*), Zvolena (Latvian*), Zvolenas (Lithuanian*), Zvoljen (Serbo-Croatian*) Zwoleń (Polish*), Vetus Solium (Latin), Jovlen – জোভলেন (Bengali) |
| (Germany) Zweibrücken | Bipontium (Latin), Deux-Ponts (French), Zweibrücken (German), Dos Puentes (Spanish*) |
| (Germany) Zwickau | Cheubikau / Ch'ŭbik'au - 츠비카우 (Korean*), Cvikov (Czech, Slovak), Zwickau (Dutch, German) |
