= Miss and Mister Korea beauty pageants =

This is a list of South Korea's representatives and their placements at the international beauty pageant considered.

International Crowns

- One — Miss Earth 2022
- One — Miss Supranational 2017
- Three — Miss Asia Pacific International 1969, 1995, 2002

== The franchise holders of the area ==
Franchise
List
- === Current ===
  - Miss Queen Korea – for both Miss Universe (2016–present) and Miss World (2011–present).
  - Miss International Korea Organization – Miss International (2026–present), Miss Asia Pacific International (2026–present), Face of Beauty International (2026–present)
  - Miss Earth Korea – Miss Earth (2025–present).
  - World Beauty Queen – Miss Supranational (2022–present), Miss Cosmo (2025–present). Miss Aura International (2022–present).
  - Miss Grand Korea Organization – Miss Grand International (2026–present), The Miss Globe (2026–present).
  - First Foundation – Miss Intercontinental (2011–present).
  - Miss Green Korea – Miss Eco International (2019–present).
  - Idun – Miss Global (2026–present).
  - Top Model of the World Korea – Top Model of the World (2024–present).
  - Miss Tourism International Korea (Super Influencer Awards) – Miss Tourism International (2024–present).
  === Past ===
  - Joongang ilbo – Miss Universe (1954–1955).
  - Miss Korea – Miss Universe (1957–2015), Miss World (1959–2010), Miss International (1960–2024), Miss Earth (2002–2024), Miss Supranational (2010), Miss Intercontinental (1977–1978, 2009–2010), Miss Asia Pacific International (1968–2005).
  - KBO – Miss International (2025), Miss Grand International (2024–2025), The Miss Globe (2024–2025), Miss Asia Pacific International (2024–2025), Face of Beauty International (2024–2025).
  - Miss Queen Korea – Miss Supranational (2014, 2017–2021).
  - Miss Earth Canada – Miss Grand International (2013–2015).
  - Miss Glorize Korea – Miss Grand International (2016–2019), Miss Global (2019–2022).
  - KPBA – Miss Grand International (2020–2023), The Miss Globe (2022–2023). Face of Beauty International (2019). Miss Planet International (2023).
  - World Beauty Queen – Miss Intercontinental (2006–2008), Miss Tourism International (2006–2023), Top Model of the World (2005–2007), Face of Beauty International (2012).
  - Miss Green Korea – The Miss Globe (2015–2018), Miss Asia Pacific International (2017–2019), Face of Beauty International (2017–2018).
  - Miss World Brazil (Miss Coreia Brasil)– Miss Charm (2023).

== Summary ==
Color keys

- : Declared as winner
- : Ended as runner-up
- : Ended as top 5/8 qualification
- : Ended as one of the finalists or semi-finalists
- : Ended as special award winner

YEAR	MISS UNIVERSE	MISS WORLD	MISS INTER NATIONAL	MISS EARTH	MISS SUPRA NATIONAL	MISS GRAND INTER NATIONAL	MISS INTER CONTI NENTAL	THE MISS GLOBE	MISS CHARM	MISS COSMO INTER NATIONAL	MISS ECO INTER NATIONAL	MISS GLOBAL	TOP MODEL OF THE WORLD	MISS ASIA PACIFIC	MISS AURA	MISS TOURISM INTER NATIONAL	MISS PLANET INTER NATIONAL	FACE OF BEAUTY	MGI ALL STARS	WOMAN OF THE WORLD
2027	TBA	TBA	TBA	TBA	TBA	TBA	TBA	TBA	TBA	TBA	TBA	TBA	TBA	TBA	TBA	Ryu Su-ah; TBA	TBA	TBA	TBA	TBA
2026	Yurim Kim; TBA	Cha Minseo	Su-yeon Jang; TBA	Na-yeong Kim; TBA	Lee Yoon-jeong (Confidence)	Lang Sa	Kim A-in; TBA	Yang Su-mi (Talent)	×	TBA	Lee Nayoung ×	Miso Park (withdrawal) ×	Soobin Kim ×	Yuju Cho; Top 25	Kim Seol-ha ×	Yulim Jang; TBA	TBA	Ha-jin Ahn; Top 15	×	(estab lished in 2027 in Philippines)
2025	Soo-yeon Lee	Min Jung (withdrawal) ×	Jihoo Kim	Yoon-seo Choi; Top 25	Yu Hyeon-jeong; Top 24	Kim Gyuri	Shin Yu-jeong	Seolha Yang	Go Yijin (withdrawal) ×	Woo Hae-su (withdrawal) ×	Kim Hyo-ju ×	Park Ye-seul; Top 21	Choi Yoon-jae; Top 16	Hee-won Yang	Hanna Kang (Withdrew) ×	Seo Jieun	×	Cho Ha-young (Asia)	(estab lished in 2026 in Thailand)	(estab lished in 2027 in Philippines)
2024	Han Ariel	↑No Pageant Held	Chung Gyu-ri	Ryu Seo-bin; Top 20	Choi Jeong-eun (Withdrew) ×	Chang Yu-hyun	Hong Se-yeon	Lee Cheong-mi (Social Media)	Kim Na-ri	×	Lee Su-min	↑No Pageant Held	Choi Yoon-jae; Top 16	Cho Ha-young	Koo Ji-eun; Top 20	Kang Min-ji	Ahn Su-ah	Cho Se-rim	(estab lished in 2026 in Thailand)	(estab lished in 2027 in Philippines)
2023	Kim So-yun	Kim Li-jin	Jung Bo-bin	Jang Da-yeon (Top 5 - Evening)	Roh Ju-hyeon (Talent)	Park Ji-young	Seol Lee Lee ×	Han Da-yeon	Larissa Han; Top 20	(estab lished in 2024 in Vietnam)	Lee Ha-yul	Robynn Ree	×	↑No Pageant Held	Kim Ju-yeon (Bikini)	Lee Ha-young	Kim Na-ri; Top 17	Stella Pyo (Tourism)	(estab lished in 2026 in Thailand)	(estab lished in 2027 in Philippines)
2022	Hanna Kim	↑No Pageant Held	Kim Su-jin	Mina Sue Choi; Winner	Song Che-ryun	Lee Ju-yeon	Doyoung Kim ×	Yoon So-hee	(estab lished in 2023 in Vietnam)	(estab lished in 2024 in Vietnam)	Minjeong Kim ×	Songyi; Kim (2nd r-up Press)	×	↑No Pageant Held	Park Seung-eun	Park Se-a (Popul arity)	×	↑No Pageant Held	(estab lished in 2026 in Thailand)	(estab lished in 2027 in Philippines)
2021	Kim Ji-su	Tara Hong (Dress)	↑No Pageant Held	×	Jeon Hye-soo	Lee Ji-ho	Lee Jeong-hyun	×	(estab lished in 2023 in Vietnam)	(estab lished in 2024 in Vietnam)	Kim Yu-min	↑No Pageant Held		↑No Pageant Held	Park Joo-won	Jung Chae-yeon	↑No Pageant Held	↑No Pageant Held	(estab lished in 2026 in Thailand)	(estab lished in 2027 in Philippines)
2020	Park Ha-Ri	↑No Pageant Held	↑No Pageant Held	×	↑No Pageant Held	Lee Hyun-young	↑No Pageant Held	×	(estab lished in 2023 in Vietnam)	(estab lished in 2024 in Vietnam)	↑No Pageant Held		×	↑No Pageant Held	Lee Seo-jin	Jo Nam-hee	↑No Pageant Held	↑No Pageant Held	(estab lished in 2026 in Thailand)	(estab lished in 2027 in Philippines)
2019	Lee Yeon-joo	Lim Ji-yeon	×	Woo Hee-jun (Jolly Waves)	Kwon Whee	Park Serim ×	Cho Ga-bi; Top 20	×	(estab lished in 2023 in Vietnam)	(estab lished in 2024 in Vietnam)	Jo Joo-hyeon (Asia)	Dojeong; Lee; Top 25	×	Kim Na-young	×	×	Choi Jung-yoon; Top 16	Kim Sang-Min; Top 20	(estab lished in 2026 in Thailand)	(estab lished in 2027 in Philippines)
2018	Baek Ji-hyun	Cho Ah (3rd r-up Top Model)	Seo Ye-jin	Song Su-hyun	Lee Eun-bi (Talent)	Choi Min	Kim Seo-hee	Jung Ji-gyo	(estab lished in 2023 in Vietnam)	(estab lished in 2024 in Vietnam)	×	Rachel; Park; Top 20	×	Kang Song-hwa	(estab lished in 2006 in Turkey, (changed to current name in 2019)	Yoo Ji-hyun; Top 10	(estab lished in 2019 in Cambo dia)	Shin Ye-jee	(estab lished in 2026 in Thailand)	(estab lished in 2027 in Philippines)
2017	Cho Se-whee	Kim Ha-eun; Top 10	Seung Woo Nam (Asia)	Hannah Lee (Friendship)	Jenny Kim; Winner	Park Ha-Young	Lee Su-Jin; 5th r-up	Lee Ji-yeon (Internet)	(estab lished in 2023 in Vietnam)	(estab lished in 2024 in Vietnam)	×	×	×	Song Hyun-jin	(estab lished in 2006 in Turkey, (changed to current name in 2019)	Kim Na-yeon (Sogo)	(estab lished in 2019 in Cambo dia)	Jang Shin-ae; Top 20	(estab lished in 2026 in Thailand)	(estab lished in 2027 in Philippines)
2016	Jenny Kim (Congeni ality)	Wang Hyun; Top 11	Min-jung Kim	Lee Chae-young; Top 16	Dasol Lee	Cho Ye-seul; Top 10	Kim Yeon-ju	Kim Soo-hyun	(estab lished in 2023 in Vietnam)	(estab lished in 2024 in Vietnam)	×	×	×	Kim So-yeon; 4th r-up	(estab lished in 2006 in Turkey, (changed to current name in 2019)	×	(estab lished in 2019 in Cambo dia)	Yun Min-Yi	(estab lished in 2026 in Thailand)	(estab lished in 2027 in Philippines)
2015	Kim Seo-yeon	Jung Eun-ju	Park Ah-reum (Asia)	Han Ho-jeong (2nd r-up Costume)	×	Dasol Lee	Cho Ye-seul; Top 17	Kim Jae-myung; Top 15	(estab lished in 2023 in Vietnam)	(estab lished in 2024 in Vietnam)	×	Jung Ji-young; Top 20	×	↑No Pageant Held	(estab lished in 2006 in Turkey, (changed to current name in 2019)	↑No Pageant Held	(estab lished in 2019 in Cambo dia)	×	(estab lished in 2026 in Thailand)	(estab lished in 2027 in Philippines)
2014	Yoo Ye-bin	Song Hwa-young	Lee Seo-bin	Shin Su-min; Top 16	Kim Min-ji	Sung Hye-Won	Ihn Dan-bi	×	(estab lished in 2023 in Vietnam)	(estab lished in 2024 in Vietnam)	(estab lished in 2015 in Egypt)	Hana Young	×	↑No Pageant Held	(estab lished in 2006 in Turkey, (changed to current name in 2019)	Yoo Hyeon-hong	(estab lished in 2019 in Cambo dia)	Ju A-ryeong	(estab lished in 2026 in Thailand)	(estab lished in 2027 in Philippines)
2013	Kim Yu-mi	Park Min-ji	Han Ji-eun	Choi Song-yi; Miss Fire	×	Kim Yu-ri	Jung Hye-Won	×	(estab lished in 2023 in Vietnam)	(estab lished in 2024 in Vietnam)	(estab lished in 2015 in Egypt)	Shin Soo-jeong; Top 20	×	↑No Pageant Held	(estab lished in 2006 in Turkey, (changed to current name in 2019)	Noh Kyung min (Charity)	(estab lished in 2019 in Cambo dia)	Jung Min-sun	(estab lished in 2026 in Thailand)	(estab lished in 2027 in Philippines)
2012	Lee Sung-hye	Kim Seong-min	Lee Jeong-bin	Kim Sa-ra; Top 16	×	(estab lished in 2013 in Thailand)	Jeong Ha-eun ×	Baek Seo-Ah (Photo)	(estab lished in 2023 in Vietnam)	(estab lished in 2024 in Vietnam)	(estab lished in 2015 in Egypt)	(estab lished in 2013 in United States, 2025 in Thailand))	×	↑No Pageant Held	(estab lished in 2006 in Turkey, (changed to current name in 2019)	Sarah Oh ×	(estab lished in 2019 in Cambo dia)	Lee Se-i	(estab lished in 2026 in Thailand)	(estab lished in 2027 in Philippines)
2011	Chong So-ra	Doh Kyung-min; Top 7	Kim Hye-sun	Kim E-seul (Fashion)	×	(estab lished in 2013 in Thailand)	Yang Ye-seung; Top 15	Seo Yeon-mi	(estab lished in 2023 in Vietnam)	(estab lished in 2024 in Vietnam)	(estab lished in 2015 in Egypt)	(estab lished in 2013 in United States, 2025 in Thailand))	×	↑No Pageant Held	(estab lished in 2006 in Turkey, (changed to current name in 2019)	Hye-jin Son	(estab lished in 2019 in Cambo dia)	(estab lished in 2012 in New Zealand)	(estab lished in 2026 in Thailand)	(estab lished in 2027 in Philippines)
2010	Kim Joo-ri	Kim Hye-young	Ko Hyeon-young; Top 15	Lee Gui-joo (Top 5-Aodai)	You Soo-jung; Top 20	(estab lished in 2013 in Thailand)	Jang Yoon-jin	×	(estab lished in 2023 in Vietnam)	(estab lished in 2024 in Vietnam)	(estab lished in 2015 in Egypt)	(estab lished in 2013 in United States, 2025 in Thailand))	Park Jae-rang	↑No Pageant Held	(estab lished in 2006 in Turkey, (changed to current name in 2019)	Kwang-hee Kim	(estab lished in 2019 in Cambo dia)	(estab lished in 2012 in New Zealand)	(estab lished in 2026 in Thailand)	(estab lished in 2027 in Philippines)
2009	Na Ri	Kim Joo-ri; Top 16	Seo Eun-mi; 1st r-up	Park Ye-ju; Top 16	×	(estab lished in 2013 in Thailand)	Cha Ye-rin; Top 15	Lee Jo-eun	(estab lished in 2023 in Vietnam)	(estab lished in 2024 in Vietnam)	(estab lished in 2015 in Egypt)	(estab lished in 2013 in United States, 2025 in Thailand))	↑No Pageant Held	↑No Pageant Held	(estab lished in 2006 in Turkey, (changed to current name in 2019)	Do Yeon-ju (Talent)	(estab lished in 2019 in Cambo dia)	(estab lished in 2012 in New Zealand)	(estab lished in 2026 in Thailand)	(estab lished in 2027 in Philippines)
2008	Lee Ji-sun	Choi Bo-in	Kim Min-jeong	Seo Seol-hee; Top 16	(estab lished in 2009 in Panama, Poland)	(estab lished in 2013 in Thailand)	Park Eun-sil; Top 15	Park Hye-jin	(estab lished in 2023 in Vietnam)	(estab lished in 2024 in Vietnam)	(estab lished in 2015 in Egypt)	(estab lished in 2013 in United States, 2025 in Thailand))	×	↑No Pageant Held	(estab lished in 2006 in Turkey, (changed to current name in 2019)	Shin Sun-ah (Costume)	(estab lished in 2019 in Cambo dia)	(estab lished in 2012 in New Zealand)	(estab lished in 2026 in Thailand)	(estab lished in 2027 in Philippines)
2007	Lee Ha-nui; 3rd r-up	Cho Eun-ju (Dress)	Park Ka-won; Top 15	Yoo Ji-eun (Fontana)	(estab lished in 2009 in Panama, Poland)	(estab lished in 2013 in Thailand)	Yoo Han-na; 1st r-up	×	(estab lished in 2023 in Vietnam)	(estab lished in 2024 in Vietnam)	(estab lished in 2015 in Egypt)	(estab lished in 2013 in United States, 2025 in Thailand))	Yang Young-hwa	↑No Pageant Held	(estab lished in 2006 in Turkey, (changed to current name in 2019)	↑No Pageant Held	(estab lished in 2019 in Cambo dia)	(estab lished in 2012 in New Zealand)	(estab lished in 2026 in Thailand)	(estab lished in 2027 in Philippines)
2006	Kim Joo-hee	Park Sharon	Jang Yun-seo; 2nd r-up	Park Hee-jung	(estab lished in 2009 in Panama, Poland)	(estab lished in 2013 in Thailand)	Song Il-Young; Top 12	×	(estab lished in 2023 in Vietnam)	(estab lished in 2024 in Vietnam)	(estab lished in 2015 in Egypt)	(estab lished in 2013 in United States, 2025 in Thailand))	Song Il-Young	↑No Pageant Held	(estab lished in 2006 in Turkey, (changed to current name in 2019)	Jin-lee Yoon	(estab lished in 2019 in Cambo dia)	(estab lished in 2012 in New Zealand)	(estab lished in 2026 in Thailand)	(estab lished in 2027 in Philippines)
2005	Kim So-young	Oh Eun-young; Top 6	Lee Kyoung-eun	Yoo Hye-mi; Top 16	(estab lished in 2009 in Panama, Poland)	(estab lished in 2013 in Thailand)	×	×	(estab lished in 2023 in Vietnam)	(estab lished in 2024 in Vietnam)	(estab lished in 2015 in Egypt)	(estab lished in 2013 in United States, 2025 in Thailand))	Yoon Jin-lee	Choi Young-ah	(estab lished in 2006 in Turkey, (changed to current name in 2019)	Su-jin Kim	(estab lished in 2019 in Cambo dia)	(estab lished in 2012 in New Zealand)	(estab lished in 2026 in Thailand)	(estab lished in 2027 in Philippines)
2004	Choi Yun-young	Han Kyoung-jin	Kim In-ha; Top 15	Cho Hye-jin	(estab lished in 2009 in Panama, Poland)	(estab lished in 2013 in Thailand)	×	×	(estab lished in 2023 in Vietnam)	(estab lished in 2024 in Vietnam)	(estab lished in 2015 in Egypt)	(estab lished in 2013 in United States, 2025 in Thailand))	×	↑No Pageant Held	(estab lished in 2006 in Turkey, (changed to current name in 2019)	×	(estab lished in 2019 in Cambo dia)	(estab lished in 2012 in New Zealand)	(estab lished in 2026 in Thailand)	(estab lished in 2027 in Philippines)
2003	Keum Na-na	Park Ji-yea	Shin Ji-Su; Top 12	Oh Yoo-mi	(estab lished in 2009 in Panama, Poland)	(estab lished in 2013 in Thailand)	×	(estab lished in 2004 in Albania)	(estab lished in 2023 in Vietnam)	(estab lished in 2024 in Vietnam)	(estab lished in 2015 in Egypt)	(estab lished in 2013 in United States, 2025 in Thailand))	×	Ahn Choon-young (Costume)	(estab lished in 2006 in Turkey, (changed to current name in 2019)	×	(estab lished in 2019 in Cambo dia)	(estab lished in 2012 in New Zealand)	(estab lished in 2026 in Thailand)	(estab lished in 2027 in Philippines)
2002	Kim Min-Kyoung	Chang Yoo-kyoung (Withdrew) ×	Gi Yun-ju; Top 12	Lee Jin-ah (Costume)	(estab lished in 2009 in Panama, Poland)	(estab lished in 2013 in Thailand)	×	(estab lished in 2004 in Albania)	(estab lished in 2023 in Vietnam)	(estab lished in 2024 in Vietnam)	(estab lished in 2015 in Egypt)	(estab lished in 2013 in United States, 2025 in Thailand))	×	Kim So-yoon; Winner	(estab lished in 2006 in Turkey, (changed to current name in 2019)	Se-na In (Friendship)	(estab lished in 2019 in Cambo dia)	(estab lished in 2012 in New Zealand)	(estab lished in 2026 in Thailand)	(estab lished in 2027 in Philippines)
2001	Kim Sa-rang (National Costume)	Seo Hyun-jin (Dress)	Baek Myoung-hee; Top 15	×	(estab lished in 2009 in Panama, Poland)	(estab lished in 2013 in Thailand)	×	(estab lished in 2004 in Albania)	(estab lished in 2023 in Vietnam)	(estab lished in 2024 in Vietnam)	(estab lished in 2015 in Egypt)	(estab lished in 2013 in United States, 2025 in Thailand))	×	Kim Ji-hye; Top 10	(estab lished in 2006 in Turkey, (changed to current name in 2019)	Hee-jung Kang	(estab lished in 2019 in Cambo dia)	(estab lished in 2012 in New Zealand)	(estab lished in 2026 in Thailand)	(estab lished in 2027 in Philippines)
2000	Kim Yeon-ju	Shin Jung-sun	Son Tae-young; 1st r-up	(estab lished in 2001 in Manila, Philippines)	(estab lished in 2009 in Panama, Poland)	(estab lished in 2013 in Thailand)	×	(estab lished in 2004 in Albania)	(estab lished in 2023 in Vietnam)	(estab lished in 2024 in Vietnam)	(estab lished in 2015 in Egypt)	(estab lished in 2013 in United States, 2025 in Thailand))	×	Chang Eun-jin (Costume)	(estab lished in 2006 in Turkey, (changed to current name in 2019)	×	(estab lished in 2019 in Cambo dia)	(estab lished in 2012 in New Zealand)	(estab lished in 2026 in Thailand)	(estab lished in 2027 in Philippines)
1999	Choi Ji-hyun	Han Na-na	Lee Jae-won	(estab lished in 2001 in Manila, Philippines)	(estab lished in 2009 in Panama, Poland)	(estab lished in 2013 in Thailand)	×	(estab lished in 2004 in Albania)	(estab lished in 2023 in Vietnam)	(estab lished in 2024 in Vietnam)	(estab lished in 2015 in Egypt)	(estab lished in 2013 in United States, 2025 in Thailand))	×	Kim Hyo-joo	(estab lished in 2006 in Turkey, (changed to current name in 2019)	×	(estab lished in 2019 in Cambo dia)	(estab lished in 2012 in New Zealand)	(estab lished in 2026 in Thailand)	(estab lished in 2027 in Philippines)
1998	Kim Ji-yeon	Kim Kun-woo	Cho Hye-young; Top 15	(estab lished in 2001 in Manila, Philippines)	(estab lished in 2009 in Panama, Poland)	(estab lished in 2013 in Thailand)	×	(estab lished in 2004 in Albania)	(estab lished in 2023 in Vietnam)	(estab lished in 2024 in Vietnam)	(estab lished in 2015 in Egypt)	(estab lished in 2013 in United States, 2025 in Thailand))	×	Yang So-hyun	(estab lished in 2006 in Turkey, (changed to current name in 2019)	×	(estab lished in 2019 in Cambo dia)	(estab lished in 2012 in New Zealand)	(estab lished in 2026 in Thailand)	(estab lished in 2027 in Philippines)
1997	Lee Eun-hee	Kim Jin-ah	Kim Ryang-hee; Top 15	(estab lished in 2001 in Manila, Philippines)	(estab lished in 2009 in Panama, Poland)	(estab lished in 2013 in Thailand)	×	(estab lished in 2004 in Albania)	(estab lished in 2023 in Vietnam)	(estab lished in 2024 in Vietnam)	(estab lished in 2015 in Egypt)	(estab lished in 2013 in United States, 2025 in Thailand))	×	Yeo Hye-jeon (Ponds)	(estab lished in 2006 in Turkey, (changed to current name in 2019)	↑No Pageant Held	(estab lished in 2019 in Cambo dia)	(estab lished in 2012 in New Zealand)	(estab lished in 2026 in Thailand)	(estab lished in 2027 in Philippines)
1996	Kim Yun-jung	Seol Soo-jin	Kim Jung-hwa; Top 15	(estab lished in 2001 in Manila, Philippines)	(estab lished in 2009 in Panama, Poland)	(estab lished in 2013 in Thailand)	×	(estab lished in 2004 in Albania)	(estab lished in 2023 in Vietnam)	(estab lished in 2024 in Vietnam)	(estab lished in 2015 in Egypt)	(estab lished in 2013 in United States, 2025 in Thailand))	×	Lee Ji-hee; Top 10	(estab lished in 2006 in Turkey, (changed to current name in 2019)	↑No Pageant Held	(estab lished in 2019 in Cambo dia)	(estab lished in 2012 in New Zealand)	(estab lished in 2026 in Thailand)	(estab lished in 2027 in Philippines)
1995	Han Sung-ju	Choi Yoon-young; Top 5	Lee Yoo-ree; Top 15	(estab lished in 2001 in Manila, Philippines)	(estab lished in 2009 in Panama, Poland)	(estab lished in 2013 in Thailand)	×	(estab lished in 2004 in Albania)	(estab lished in 2023 in Vietnam)	(estab lished in 2024 in Vietnam)	(estab lished in 2015 in Egypt)	(estab lished in 2013 in United States, 2025 in Thailand))	×	Yoon Mi-jung; Winner	(estab lished in 2006 in Turkey, (changed to current name in 2019)	×	(estab lished in 2019 in Cambo dia)	(estab lished in 2012 in New Zealand)	(estab lished in 2026 in Thailand)	(estab lished in 2027 in Philippines)
1994	Goong Sun-young	Chae Yeon-hee	Sung Hyun-ah; Top 15	(estab lished in 2001 in Manila, Philippines)	(estab lished in 2009 in Panama, Poland)	(estab lished in 2013 in Thailand)	×	(estab lished in 2004 in Albania)	(estab lished in 2023 in Vietnam)	(estab lished in 2024 in Vietnam)	(estab lished in 2015 in Egypt)	(estab lished in 2013 in United States, 2025 in Thailand))	×	Chang Mi-ho; Top 12	(estab lished in 2006 in Turkey, (changed to current name in 2019)	Jee Young-min; 2nd r-up	(estab lished in 2019 in Cambo dia)	(estab lished in 2012 in New Zealand)	(estab lished in 2026 in Thailand)	(estab lished in 2027 in Philippines)
1993	Yoo Ha-young	Lee Seung-yeon; Top 10	Chang Eun-young; Top 15	(estab lished in 2001 in Manila, Philippines)	(estab lished in 2009 in Panama, Poland)	(estab lished in 2013 in Thailand)	×	(estab lished in 2004 in Albania)	(estab lished in 2023 in Vietnam)	(estab lished in 2024 in Vietnam)	(estab lished in 2015 in Egypt)	(estab lished in 2013 in United States, 2025 in Thailand))	×	Seo Yeon-jung (Costume)	(estab lished in 2006 in Turkey, (changed to current name in 2019)	(estab lished in 1994 in Malaysia)	(estab lished in 2019 in Cambo dia)	(estab lished in 2012 in New Zealand)	(estab lished in 2026 in Thailand)	(estab lished in 2027 in Philippines)
1992	Lee Young-hyun	Lee Mi-young	Yum Jung-ah; 2nd r-up	(estab lished in 2001 in Manila, Philippines)	(estab lished in 2009 in Panama, Poland)	(estab lished in 2013 in Thailand)	×	(estab lished in 2004 in Albania)	(estab lished in 2023 in Vietnam)	(estab lished in 2024 in Vietnam)	(estab lished in 2015 in Egypt)	(estab lished in 2013 in United States, 2025 in Thailand))	(estab lished in 1993 in Miami)	×	(estab lished in 2006 in Turkey, (changed to current name in 2019)	(estab lished in 1994 in Malaysia)	(estab lished in 2019 in Cambo dia)	(estab lished in 2012 in New Zealand)	(estab lished in 2026 in Thailand)	(estab lished in 2027 in Philippines)
1991	Seo Jung-min	Kim Tae-hwa	Kwon Jung-joo; Top 15	(estab lished in 2001 in Manila, Philippines)	(estab lished in 2009 in Panama, Poland)	(estab lished in 2013 in Thailand)	×	(estab lished in 2004 in Albania)	(estab lished in 2023 in Vietnam)	(estab lished in 2024 in Vietnam)	(estab lished in 2015 in Egypt)	(estab lished in 2013 in United States, 2025 in Thailand))	(estab lished in 1993 in Miami)	↑No Pageant Held	(estab lished in 2006 in Turkey, (changed to current name in 2019)	(estab lished in 1994 in Malaysia)	(estab lished in 2019 in Cambo dia)	(estab lished in 2012 in New Zealand)	(estab lished in 2026 in Thailand)	(estab lished in 2027 in Philippines)
1990	Oh Hyun-kyung	Go Hyun-jung	Shin Soh-young	(estab lished in 2001 in Manila, Philippines)	(estab lished in 2009 in Panama, Poland)	(estab lished in 2013 in Thailand)	×	(estab lished in 2004 in Albania)	(estab lished in 2023 in Vietnam)	(estab lished in 2024 in Vietnam)	(estab lished in 2015 in Egypt)	(estab lished in 2013 in United States, 2025 in Thailand))	(estab lished in 1993 in Miami)	↑No Pageant Held	(estab lished in 2006 in Turkey, (changed to current name in 2019)	(estab lished in 1994 in Malaysia)	(estab lished in 2019 in Cambo dia)	(estab lished in 2012 in New Zealand)	(estab lished in 2026 in Thailand)	(estab lished in 2027 in Philippines)
1989	Kim Sung-ryung	Kim Hye-ri	Kim Hee-jung; Top 15	(estab lished in 2001 in Manila, Philippines)	(estab lished in 2009 in Panama, Poland)	(estab lished in 2013 in Thailand)	×	(estab lished in 2004 in Albania)	(estab lished in 2023 in Vietnam)	(estab lished in 2024 in Vietnam)	(estab lished in 2015 in Egypt)	(estab lished in 2013 in United States, 2025 in Thailand))	(estab lished in 1993 in Miami)	Chae Wha-jung	(estab lished in 2006 in Turkey, (changed to current name in 2019)	(estab lished in 1994 in Malaysia)	(estab lished in 2019 in Cambo dia)	(estab lished in 2012 in New Zealand)	(estab lished in 2026 in Thailand)	(estab lished in 2027 in Philippines)
1988	Jang Yoon-jeong; 1st r-up	Choi Yeon-hee; 1st r-up	Lee Yoon-hee; Top 15	(estab lished in 2001 in Manila, Philippines)	(estab lished in 2009 in Panama, Poland)	(estab lished in 2013 in Thailand)	×	(estab lished in 2004 in Albania)	(estab lished in 2023 in Vietnam)	(estab lished in 2024 in Vietnam)	(estab lished in 2015 in Egypt)	(estab lished in 2013 in United States, 2025 in Thailand))	(estab lished in 1993 in Miami)	Kim Mi-rim; 4th r-up	(estab lished in 2006 in Turkey, (changed to current name in 2019)	(estab lished in 1994 in Malaysia)	(estab lished in 2019 in Cambo dia)	(estab lished in 2012 in New Zealand)	(estab lished in 2026 in Thailand)	(estab lished in 2027 in Philippines)
1987	Kim Ji-eun	Chung Myoung-sun	Chung Wha-sun	(estab lished in 2001 in Manila, Philippines)	(estab lished in 2009 in Panama, Poland)	(estab lished in 2013 in Thailand)	×	(estab lished in 2004 in Albania)	(estab lished in 2023 in Vietnam)	(estab lished in 2024 in Vietnam)	(estab lished in 2015 in Egypt)	(estab lished in 2013 in United States, 2025 in Thailand))	(estab lished in 1993 in Miami)	Choi Eun-hee; 3rd r-up	(estab lished in 2006 in Turkey, (changed to current name in 2019)	(estab lished in 1994 in Malaysia)	(estab lished in 2019 in Cambo dia)	(estab lished in 2012 in New Zealand)	(estab lished in 2026 in Thailand)	(estab lished in 2027 in Philippines)
1986	Bae Young-ran	An Jung-mi	Kim Yoon-jung	(estab lished in 2001 in Manila, Philippines)	(estab lished in 2009 in Panama, Poland)	(estab lished in 2013 in Thailand)	×	(estab lished in 2004 in Albania)	(estab lished in 2023 in Vietnam)	(estab lished in 2024 in Vietnam)	(estab lished in 2015 in Egypt)	(estab lished in 2013 in United States, 2025 in Thailand))	(estab lished in 1993 in Miami)	Seo Hyun-kyoung; Top 16	(estab lished in 2006 in Turkey, (changed to current name in 2019)	(estab lished in 1994 in Malaysia)	(estab lished in 2019 in Cambo dia)	(estab lished in 2012 in New Zealand)	(estab lished in 2026 in Thailand)	(estab lished in 2027 in Philippines)
1985	Choi Young-ok	Park Eun-kyoung	Chang Sih-wha	(estab lished in 2001 in Manila, Philippines)	(estab lished in 2009 in Panama, Poland)	(estab lished in 2013 in Thailand)	×	(estab lished in 2004 in Albania)	(estab lished in 2023 in Vietnam)	(estab lished in 2024 in Vietnam)	(estab lished in 2015 in Egypt)	(estab lished in 2013 in United States, 2025 in Thailand))	(estab lished in 1993 in Miami)	Lim Ji-yeon; 1st r-up	(estab lished in 2006 in Turkey, (changed to current name in 2019)	(estab lished in 1994 in Malaysia)	(estab lished in 2019 in Cambo dia)	(estab lished in 2012 in New Zealand)	(estab lished in 2026 in Thailand)	(estab lished in 2027 in Philippines)
1984	Lim Mi-sook	Lee Joo-hee	Kim Kyoung-ree	(estab lished in 2001 in Manila, Philippines)	(estab lished in 2009 in Panama, Poland)	(estab lished in 2013 in Thailand)	↑No Pageant Held	(estab lished in 2004 in Albania)	(estab lished in 2023 in Vietnam)	(estab lished in 2024 in Vietnam)	(estab lished in 2015 in Egypt)	(estab lished in 2013 in United States, 2025 in Thailand))	(estab lished in 1993 in Miami)	Oh Sook-hee	(estab lished in 2006 in Turkey, (changed to current name in 2019)	(estab lished in 1994 in Malaysia)	(estab lished in 2019 in Cambo dia)	(estab lished in 2012 in New Zealand)	(estab lished in 2026 in Thailand)	(estab lished in 2027 in Philippines)
1983	Kim Jong-Jung (Costume)	Seo Min-sook	Chung Young-soon; Top 15	(estab lished in 2001 in Manila, Philippines)	(estab lished in 2009 in Panama, Poland)	(estab lished in 2013 in Thailand)	×	(estab lished in 2004 in Albania)	(estab lished in 2023 in Vietnam)	(estab lished in 2024 in Vietnam)	(estab lished in 2015 in Egypt)	(estab lished in 2013 in United States, 2025 in Thailand))	(estab lished in 1993 in Miami)	×	(estab lished in 2006 in Turkey, (changed to current name in 2019)	(estab lished in 1994 in Malaysia)	(estab lished in 2019 in Cambo dia)	(estab lished in 2012 in New Zealand)	(estab lished in 2026 in Thailand)	(estab lished in 2027 in Philippines)
1982	Park Sun-hee	Choi Sung-yoon	Chung Ae-hee	(estab lished in 2001 in Manila, Philippines)	(estab lished in 2009 in Panama, Poland)	(estab lished in 2013 in Thailand)	×	(estab lished in 2004 in Albania)	(estab lished in 2023 in Vietnam)	(estab lished in 2024 in Vietnam)	(estab lished in 2015 in Egypt)	(estab lished in 2013 in United States, 2025 in Thailand))	(estab lished in 1993 in Miami)	Kim Mi-sun; 4th r-up	(estab lished in 2006 in Turkey, (changed to current name in 2019)	(estab lished in 1994 in Malaysia)	(estab lished in 2019 in Cambo dia)	(estab lished in 2012 in New Zealand)	(estab lished in 2026 in Thailand)	(estab lished in 2027 in Philippines)
1981	Lee Eun-jung (2nd r-up Costume)	Lee Han-na	Park Hyun-joo	(estab lished in 2001 in Manila, Philippines)	(estab lished in 2009 in Panama, Poland)	(estab lished in 2013 in Thailand)	×	(estab lished in 2004 in Albania)	(estab lished in 2023 in Vietnam)	(estab lished in 2024 in Vietnam)	(estab lished in 2015 in Egypt)	(estab lished in 2013 in United States, 2025 in Thailand))	(estab lished in 1993 in Miami)	Kang Min-jung; 3rd r-up	(estab lished in 2006 in Turkey, (changed to current name in 2019)	(estab lished in 1994 in Malaysia)	(estab lished in 2019 in Cambo dia)	(estab lished in 2012 in New Zealand)	(estab lished in 2026 in Thailand)	(estab lished in 2027 in Philippines)
1980	Kim Eun-jung; Top 12	Chang Sun-ja	Chung Na-young	(estab lished in 2001 in Manila, Philippines)	(estab lished in 2009 in Panama, Poland)	(estab lished in 2013 in Thailand)	×	(estab lished in 2004 in Albania)	(estab lished in 2023 in Vietnam)	(estab lished in 2024 in Vietnam)	(estab lished in 2015 in Egypt)	(estab lished in 2013 in United States, 2025 in Thailand))	(estab lished in 1993 in Miami)	Lee Joo-yeon	(estab lished in 2006 in Turkey, (changed to current name in 2019)	(estab lished in 1994 in Malaysia)	(estab lished in 2019 in Cambo dia)	(estab lished in 2012 in New Zealand)	(estab lished in 2026 in Thailand)	(estab lished in 2027 in Philippines)
1979	Seo Jae-hwa	Hong Yeo-jin	Kim Jin-sun	(estab lished in 2001 in Manila, Philippines)	(estab lished in 2009 in Panama, Poland)	(estab lished in 2013 in Thailand)	×	(estab lished in 2004 in Albania)	(estab lished in 2023 in Vietnam)	(estab lished in 2024 in Vietnam)	(estab lished in 2015 in Egypt)	(estab lished in 2013 in United States, 2025 in Thailand))	(estab lished in 1993 in Miami)	Park Sook-jae	(estab lished in 2006 in Turkey, (changed to current name in 2019)	(estab lished in 1994 in Malaysia)	(estab lished in 2019 in Cambo dia)	(estab lished in 2012 in New Zealand)	(estab lished in 2026 in Thailand)	(estab lished in 2027 in Philippines)
1978	Son Jung-eun (1st r-up Costume)	Je Eun-jin	Chae Jung-sook	(estab lished in 2001 in Manila, Philippines)	(estab lished in 2009 in Panama, Poland)	(estab lished in 2013 in Thailand)	Park Kyoung-ae	(estab lished in 2004 in Albania)	(estab lished in 2023 in Vietnam)	(estab lished in 2024 in Vietnam)	(estab lished in 2015 in Egypt)	(estab lished in 2013 in United States, 2025 in Thailand))	(estab lished in 1993 in Miami)	Kim Young-sun	(estab lished in 2006 in Turkey, (changed to current name in 2019)	(estab lished in 1994 in Malaysia)	(estab lished in 2019 in Cambo dia)	(estab lished in 2012 in New Zealand)	(estab lished in 2026 in Thailand)	(estab lished in 2027 in Philippines)
1977	Kim Sung-hee (Costume)	Kim Soon-ae	Shin Byoung-ok	(estab lished in 2001 in Manila, Philippines)	(estab lished in 2009 in Panama, Poland)	(estab lished in 2013 in Thailand)	Chung Mi-hee	(estab lished in 2004 in Albania)	(estab lished in 2023 in Vietnam)	(estab lished in 2024 in Vietnam)	(estab lished in 2015 in Egypt)	(estab lished in 2013 in United States, 2025 in Thailand))	(estab lished in 1993 in Miami)	Chung Kyoung-sook (Photogenic)	(estab lished in 2006 in Turkey, (changed to current name in 2019)	(estab lished in 1994 in Malaysia)	(estab lished in 2019 in Cambo dia)	(estab lished in 2012 in New Zealand)	(estab lished in 2026 in Thailand)	(estab lished in 2027 in Philippines)
1976	Chung Kwang-Hyun	Shim Byoung-sook	Han Young-ae	(estab lished in 2001 in Manila, Philippines)	(estab lished in 2009 in Panama, Poland)	(estab lished in 2013 in Thailand)	×	(estab lished in 2004 in Albania)	(estab lished in 2023 in Vietnam)	(estab lished in 2024 in Vietnam)	(estab lished in 2015 in Egypt)	(estab lished in 2013 in United States, 2025 in Thailand))	(estab lished in 1993 in Miami)	Jin-Sook (Photogenic)	(estab lished in 2006 in Turkey, (changed to current name in 2019)	(estab lished in 1994 in Malaysia)	(estab lished in 2019 in Cambo dia)	(estab lished in 2012 in New Zealand)	(estab lished in 2026 in Thailand)	(estab lished in 2027 in Philippines)
1975	Seo Ji-hye	Lee Sung-hee	Lee Hyang-mok; Top 15	(estab lished in 2001 in Manila, Philippines)	(estab lished in 2009 in Panama, Poland)	(estab lished in 2013 in Thailand)	×	(estab lished in 2004 in Albania)	(estab lished in 2023 in Vietnam)	(estab lished in 2024 in Vietnam)	(estab lished in 2015 in Egypt)	(estab lished in 2013 in United States, 2025 in Thailand))	(estab lished in 1993 in Miami)	Kim Tae-hee (Costume)	(estab lished in 2006 in Turkey, (changed to current name in 2019)	(estab lished in 1994 in Malaysia)	(estab lished in 2019 in Cambo dia)	(estab lished in 2012 in New Zealand)	(estab lished in 2026 in Thailand)	(estab lished in 2027 in Philippines)
1974	Kim Eun-jung (Costume)	Shim Kyoung-sook	Kang Young-sook; Top 15	(estab lished in 2001 in Manila, Philippines)	(estab lished in 2009 in Panama, Poland)	(estab lished in 2013 in Thailand)	×	(estab lished in 2004 in Albania)	(estab lished in 2023 in Vietnam)	(estab lished in 2024 in Vietnam)	(estab lished in 2015 in Egypt)	(estab lished in 2013 in United States, 2025 in Thailand))	(estab lished in 1993 in Miami)	×	(estab lished in 2006 in Turkey, (changed to current name in 2019)	(estab lished in 1994 in Malaysia)	(estab lished in 2019 in Cambo dia)	(estab lished in 2012 in New Zealand)	(estab lished in 2026 in Thailand)	(estab lished in 2027 in Philippines)
1973	Kim Young-ju	An Soon-young	Kim Mae-ja	(estab lished in 2001 in Manila, Philippines)	(estab lished in 2009 in Panama, Poland)	(estab lished in 2013 in Thailand)	×	(estab lished in 2004 in Albania)	(estab lished in 2023 in Vietnam)	(estab lished in 2024 in Vietnam)	(estab lished in 2015 in Egypt)	(estab lished in 2013 in United States, 2025 in Thailand))	(estab lished in 1993 in Miami)	Chung Keum-ok; 3rd r-up	(estab lished in 2006 in Turkey, (changed to current name in 2019)	(estab lished in 1994 in Malaysia)	(estab lished in 2019 in Cambo dia)	(estab lished in 2012 in New Zealand)	(estab lished in 2026 in Thailand)	(estab lished in 2027 in Philippines)
1972	Park Yeon-joo	Chung Keum-ok ×	Suh Ae-ja	(estab lished in 2001 in Manila, Philippines)	(estab lished in 2009 in Panama, Poland)	(estab lished in 2013 in Thailand)	×	(estab lished in 2004 in Albania)	(estab lished in 2023 in Vietnam)	(estab lished in 2024 in Vietnam)	(estab lished in 2015 in Egypt)	(estab lished in 2013 in United States, 2025 in Thailand))	(estab lished in 1993 in Miami)	Shin Gah-jung	(estab lished in 2006 in Turkey, (changed to current name in 2019)	(estab lished in 1994 in Malaysia)	(estab lished in 2019 in Cambo dia)	(estab lished in 2012 in New Zealand)	(estab lished in 2026 in Thailand)	(estab lished in 2027 in Philippines)
1971	Noh Mi-ae	Lee Young-eun	Choi Sook-ae	(estab lished in 2001 in Manila, Philippines)	(estab lished in 2009 in Panama, Poland)	(estab lished in 2013 in Thailand)	×	(estab lished in 2004 in Albania)	(estab lished in 2023 in Vietnam)	(estab lished in 2024 in Vietnam)	(estab lished in 2015 in Egypt)	(estab lished in 2013 in United States, 2025 in Thailand))	(estab lished in 1993 in Miami)	Hong Shin-hee; 2nd r-up	(estab lished in 2006 in Turkey, (changed to current name in 2019)	(estab lished in 1994 in Malaysia)	(estab lished in 2019 in Cambo dia)	(estab lished in 2012 in New Zealand)	(estab lished in 2026 in Thailand)	(estab lished in 2027 in Philippines)
1970	Yoo Young-ae	Lee Jung-hee	Kim In-sook	(estab lished in 2001 in Manila, Philippines)	(estab lished in 2009 in Panama, Poland)	(estab lished in 2013 in Thailand)	(estab lished in 1971 in Panama, Germany)	(estab lished in 2004 in Albania)	(estab lished in 2023 in Vietnam)	(estab lished in 2024 in Vietnam)	(estab lished in 2015 in Egypt)	(estab lished in 2013 in United States, 2025 in Thailand))	(estab lished in 1993 in Miami)	×	(estab lished in 2006 in Turkey, (changed to current name in 2019)	(estab lished in 1994 in Malaysia)	(estab lished in 2019 in Cambo dia)	(estab lished in 2012 in New Zealand)	(estab lished in 2026 in Thailand)	(estab lished in 2027 in Philippines)
1969	Lim Hyun-jung	Kim Seung-hee	Kim Yoo-kyoung	(estab lished in 2001 in Manila, Philippines)	(estab lished in 2009 in Panama, Poland)	(estab lished in 2013 in Thailand)	(estab lished in 1971 in Panama, Germany)	(estab lished in 2004 in Albania)	(estab lished in 2023 in Vietnam)	(estab lished in 2024 in Vietnam)	(estab lished in 2015 in Egypt)	(estab lished in 2013 in United States, 2025 in Thailand))	(estab lished in 1993 in Miami)	Seo Won-Kyoung; Winner	(estab lished in 2006 in Turkey, (changed to current name in 2019)	(estab lished in 1994 in Malaysia)	(estab lished in 2019 in Cambo dia)	(estab lished in 2012 in New Zealand)	(estab lished in 2026 in Thailand)	(estab lished in 2027 in Philippines)
1968	Kim Yoon-jung	Lee Ji-eun	Kim Hee-ja; Top 15	(estab lished in 2001 in Manila, Philippines)	(estab lished in 2009 in Panama, Poland)	(estab lished in 2013 in Thailand)	(estab lished in 1971 in Panama, Germany)	(estab lished in 2004 in Albania)	(estab lished in 2023 in Vietnam)	(estab lished in 2024 in Vietnam)	(estab lished in 2015 in Egypt)	(estab lished in 2013 in United States, 2025 in Thailand))	(estab lished in 1993 in Miami)	Chang Hye-sun	(estab lished in 2006 in Turkey, (changed to current name in 2019)	(estab lished in 1994 in Malaysia)	(estab lished in 2019 in Cambo dia)	(estab lished in 2012 in New Zealand)	(estab lished in 2026 in Thailand)	(estab lished in 2027 in Philippines)
1967	Hong Joung-ae	Chung Young-hwa	Jin Hyun-soo	(estab lished in 2001 in Manila, Philippines)	(estab lished in 2009 in Panama, Poland)	(estab lished in 2013 in Thailand)	(estab lished in 1971 in Panama, Germany)	(estab lished in 2004 in Albania)	(estab lished in 2023 in Vietnam)	(estab lished in 2024 in Vietnam)	(estab lished in 2015 in Egypt)	(estab lished in 2013 in United States, 2025 in Thailand))	(estab lished in 1993 in Miami)	↑No Pageant Held	(estab lished in 2006 in Turkey, (changed to current name in 2019)	(estab lished in 1994 in Malaysia)	(estab lished in 2019 in Cambo dia)	(estab lished in 2012 in New Zealand)	(estab lished in 2026 in Thailand)	(estab lished in 2027 in Philippines)
1966	Yoon Gui-hyun	Chung Eul-sun	↑No Pageant Held	(estab lished in 2001 in Manila, Philippines)	(estab lished in 2009 in Panama, Poland)	(estab lished in 2013 in Thailand)	(estab lished in 1971 in Panama, Germany)	(estab lished in 2004 in Albania)	(estab lished in 2023 in Vietnam)	(estab lished in 2024 in Vietnam)	(estab lished in 2015 in Egypt)	(estab lished in 2013 in United States, 2025 in Thailand))	(estab lished in 1993 in Miami)	↑No Pageant Held	(estab lished in 2006 in Turkey, (changed to current name in 2019)	(estab lished in 1994 in Malaysia)	(estab lished in 2019 in Cambo dia)	(estab lished in 2012 in New Zealand)	(estab lished in 2026 in Thailand)	(estab lished in 2027 in Philippines)
1965	Kim Eun-ji	Lee Eun-ah; Top 16	Kim Min-jin; Top 15	(estab lished in 2001 in Manila, Philippines)	(estab lished in 2009 in Panama, Poland)	(estab lished in 2013 in Thailand)	(estab lished in 1971 in Panama, Germany)	(estab lished in 2004 in Albania)	(estab lished in 2023 in Vietnam)	(estab lished in 2024 in Vietnam)	(estab lished in 2015 in Egypt)	(estab lished in 2013 in United States, 2025 in Thailand))	(estab lished in 1993 in Miami)	×	(estab lished in 2006 in Turkey, (changed to current name in 2019)	(estab lished in 1994 in Malaysia)	(estab lished in 2019 in Cambo dia)	(estab lished in 2012 in New Zealand)	(estab lished in 2026 in Thailand)	(estab lished in 2027 in Philippines)
1964	Shin Jung-hyun	Yoon Mi-hee	Lee Hye-jin; Top 15	(estab lished in 2001 in Manila, Philippines)	(estab lished in 2009 in Panama, Poland)	(estab lished in 2013 in Thailand)	(estab lished in 1971 in Panama, Germany)	(estab lished in 2004 in Albania)	(estab lished in 2023 in Vietnam)	(estab lished in 2024 in Vietnam)	(estab lished in 2015 in Egypt)	(estab lished in 2013 in United States, 2025 in Thailand))	(estab lished in 1993 in Miami)	(estab lished in 1965 in Phili ppines, (changed to current name in 2005)	(estab lished in 2006 in Turkey, (changed to current name in 2019)	(estab lished in 1994 in Malaysia)	(estab lished in 2019 in Cambo dia)	(estab lished in 2012 in New Zealand)	(estab lished in 2026 in Thailand)	(estab lished in 2027 in Philippines)
1963	Kim Myoung-ja; 4th r-up	Choi Keum-shil; Top 14	Choi Yoo-mi; 4th r-up	(estab lished in 2001 in Manila, Philippines)	(estab lished in 2009 in Panama, Poland)	(estab lished in 2013 in Thailand)	(estab lished in 1971 in Panama, Germany)	(estab lished in 2004 in Albania)	(estab lished in 2023 in Vietnam)	(estab lished in 2024 in Vietnam)	(estab lished in 2015 in Egypt)	(estab lished in 2013 in United States, 2025 in Thailand))	(estab lished in 1993 in Miami)	(estab lished in 1965 in Phili ppines, (changed to current name in 2005)	(estab lished in 2006 in Turkey, (changed to current name in 2019)	(estab lished in 1994 in Malaysia)	(estab lished in 2019 in Cambo dia)	(estab lished in 2012 in New Zealand)	(estab lished in 2026 in Thailand)	(estab lished in 2027 in Philippines)
1962	Seo Bum-ju; Top 15	Chung Tae-ja	Sohn Yang-ja	(estab lished in 2001 in Manila, Philippines)	(estab lished in 2009 in Panama, Poland)	(estab lished in 2013 in Thailand)	(estab lished in 1971 in Panama, Germany)	(estab lished in 2004 in Albania)	(estab lished in 2023 in Vietnam)	(estab lished in 2024 in Vietnam)	(estab lished in 2015 in Egypt)	(estab lished in 2013 in United States, 2025 in Thailand))	(estab lished in 1993 in Miami)	(estab lished in 1965 in Phili ppines, (changed to current name in 2005)	(estab lished in 2006 in Turkey, (changed to current name in 2019)	(estab lished in 1994 in Malaysia)	(estab lished in 2019 in Cambo dia)	(estab lished in 2012 in New Zealand)	(estab lished in 2026 in Thailand)	(estab lished in 2027 in Philippines)
1961	Seo Yang-hee; Top 15	Hyun Chang-ae	Lee Ok-ja	(estab lished in 2001 in Manila, Philippines)	(estab lished in 2009 in Panama, Poland)	(estab lished in 2013 in Thailand)	(estab lished in 1971 in Panama, Germany)	(estab lished in 2004 in Albania)	(estab lished in 2023 in Vietnam)	(estab lished in 2024 in Vietnam)	(estab lished in 2015 in Egypt)	(estab lished in 2013 in United States, 2025 in Thailand))	(estab lished in 1993 in Miami)	(estab lished in 1965 in Phili ppines, (changed to current name in 2005)	(estab lished in 2006 in Turkey, (changed to current name in 2019)	(estab lished in 1994 in Malaysia)	(estab lished in 2019 in Cambo dia)	(estab lished in 2012 in New Zealand)	(estab lished in 2026 in Thailand)	(estab lished in 2027 in Philippines)
1960	Son Mi-hee-ja; Top 15	Lee Young-hee; Top 10	Kim Jung-ja	(estab lished in 2001 in Manila, Philippines)	(estab lished in 2009 in Panama, Poland)	(estab lished in 2013 in Thailand)	(estab lished in 1971 in Panama, Germany)	(estab lished in 2004 in Albania)	(estab lished in 2023 in Vietnam)	(estab lished in 2024 in Vietnam)	(estab lished in 2015 in Egypt)	(estab lished in 2013 in United States, 2025 in Thailand))	(estab lished in 1993 in Miami)	(estab lished in 1965 in Phili ppines, (changed to current name in 2005)	(estab lished in 2006 in Turkey, (changed to current name in 2019)	(estab lished in 1994 in Malaysia)	(estab lished in 2019 in Cambo dia)	(estab lished in 2012 in New Zealand)	(estab lished in 2026 in Thailand)	(estab lished in 2027 in Philippines)
1959	Oh Hyun-ju; Top 15	Seo Jung-ae	(estab lished in 1960 in California, United States and then it was transferred in 1968 in Tokyo, Japan)	(estab lished in 2001 in Manila, Philippines)	(estab lished in 2009 in Panama, Poland)	(estab lished in 2013 in Thailand)	(estab lished in 1971 in Panama, Germany)	(estab lished in 2004 in Albania)	(estab lished in 2023 in Vietnam)	(estab lished in 2024 in Vietnam)	(estab lished in 2015 in Egypt)	(estab lished in 2013 in United States, 2025 in Thailand))	(estab lished in 1993 in Miami)	(estab lished in 1965 in Phili ppines, (changed to current name in 2005)	(estab lished in 2006 in Turkey, (changed to current name in 2019)	(estab lished in 1994 in Malaysia)	(estab lished in 2019 in Cambo dia)	(estab lished in 2012 in New Zealand)	(estab lished in 2026 in Thailand)	(estab lished in 2027 in Philippines)
1958	Oh Geum-sun	×	(estab lished in 1960 in California, United States and then it was transferred in 1968 in Tokyo, Japan)	(estab lished in 2001 in Manila, Philippines)	(estab lished in 2009 in Panama, Poland)	(estab lished in 2013 in Thailand)	(estab lished in 1971 in Panama, Germany)	(estab lished in 2004 in Albania)	(estab lished in 2023 in Vietnam)	(estab lished in 2024 in Vietnam)	(estab lished in 2015 in Egypt)	(estab lished in 2013 in United States, 2025 in Thailand))	(estab lished in 1993 in Miami)	(estab lished in 1965 in Phili ppines, (changed to current name in 2005)	(estab lished in 2006 in Turkey, (changed to current name in 2019)	(estab lished in 1994 in Malaysia)	(estab lished in 2019 in Cambo dia)	(estab lished in 2012 in New Zealand)	(estab lished in 2026 in Thailand)	(estab lished in 2027 in Philippines)
1957	Park Hyun-ok	×	(estab lished in 1960 in California, United States and then it was transferred in 1968 in Tokyo, Japan)	(estab lished in 2001 in Manila, Philippines)	(estab lished in 2009 in Panama, Poland)	(estab lished in 2013 in Thailand)	(estab lished in 1971 in Panama, Germany)	(estab lished in 2004 in Albania)	(estab lished in 2023 in Vietnam)	(estab lished in 2024 in Vietnam)	(estab lished in 2015 in Egypt)	(estab lished in 2013 in United States, 2025 in Thailand))	(estab lished in 1993 in Miami)	(estab lished in 1965 in Phili ppines, (changed to current name in 2005)	(estab lished in 2006 in Turkey, (changed to current name in 2019)	(estab lished in 1994 in Malaysia)	(estab lished in 2019 in Cambo dia)	(estab lished in 2012 in New Zealand)	(estab lished in 2026 in Thailand)	(estab lished in 2027 in Philippines)
1956	×	×	(estab lished in 1960 in California, United States and then it was transferred in 1968 in Tokyo, Japan)	(estab lished in 2001 in Manila, Philippines)	(estab lished in 2009 in Panama, Poland)	(estab lished in 2013 in Thailand)	(estab lished in 1971 in Panama, Germany)	(estab lished in 2004 in Albania)	(estab lished in 2023 in Vietnam)	(estab lished in 2024 in Vietnam)	(estab lished in 2015 in Egypt)	(estab lished in 2013 in United States, 2025 in Thailand))	(estab lished in 1993 in Miami)	(estab lished in 1965 in Phili ppines, (changed to current name in 2005)	(estab lished in 2006 in Turkey, (changed to current name in 2019)	(estab lished in 1994 in Malaysia)	(estab lished in 2019 in Cambo dia)	(estab lished in 2012 in New Zealand)	(estab lished in 2026 in Thailand)	(estab lished in 2027 in Philippines)
1955	Kim Mee-chong	×	(estab lished in 1960 in California, United States and then it was transferred in 1968 in Tokyo, Japan)	(estab lished in 2001 in Manila, Philippines)	(estab lished in 2009 in Panama, Poland)	(estab lished in 2013 in Thailand)	(estab lished in 1971 in Panama, Germany)	(estab lished in 2004 in Albania)	(estab lished in 2023 in Vietnam)	(estab lished in 2024 in Vietnam)	(estab lished in 2015 in Egypt)	(estab lished in 2013 in United States, 2025 in Thailand))	(estab lished in 1993 in Miami)	(estab lished in 1965 in Phili ppines, (changed to current name in 2005)	(estab lished in 2006 in Turkey, (changed to current name in 2019)	(estab lished in 1994 in Malaysia)	(estab lished in 2019 in Cambo dia)	(estab lished in 2012 in New Zealand)	(estab lished in 2026 in Thailand)	(estab lished in 2027 in Philippines)
1954	Kye Sun-hee	×	(estab lished in 1960 in California, United States and then it was transferred in 1968 in Tokyo, Japan)	(estab lished in 2001 in Manila, Philippines)	(estab lished in 2009 in Panama, Poland)	(estab lished in 2013 in Thailand)	(estab lished in 1971 in Panama, Germany)	(estab lished in 2004 in Albania)	(estab lished in 2023 in Vietnam)	(estab lished in 2024 in Vietnam)	(estab lished in 2015 in Egypt)	(estab lished in 2013 in United States, 2025 in Thailand))	(estab lished in 1993 in Miami)	(estab lished in 1965 in Phili ppines, (changed to current name in 2005)	(estab lished in 2006 in Turkey, (changed to current name in 2019)	(estab lished in 1994 in Malaysia)	(estab lished in 2019 in Cambo dia)	(estab lished in 2012 in New Zealand)	(estab lished in 2026 in Thailand)	(estab lished in 2027 in Philippines)
1953	Kang Gui-hee ×	×	(estab lished in 1960 in California, United States and then it was transferred in 1968 in Tokyo, Japan)	(estab lished in 2001 in Manila, Philippines)	(estab lished in 2009 in Panama, Poland)	(estab lished in 2013 in Thailand)	(estab lished in 1971 in Panama, Germany)	(estab lished in 2004 in Albania)	(estab lished in 2023 in Vietnam)	(estab lished in 2024 in Vietnam)	(estab lished in 2015 in Egypt)	(estab lished in 2013 in United States, 2025 in Thailand))	(estab lished in 1993 in Miami)	(estab lished in 1965 in Phili ppines, (changed to current name in 2005)	(estab lished in 2006 in Turkey, (changed to current name in 2019)	(estab lished in 1994 in Malaysia)	(estab lished in 2019 in Cambo dia)	(estab lished in 2012 in New Zealand)	(estab lished in 2026 in Thailand)	(estab lished in 2027 in Philippines)
1952	×	×	(estab lished in 1960 in California, United States and then it was transferred in 1968 in Tokyo, Japan)	(estab lished in 2001 in Manila, Philippines)	(estab lished in 2009 in Panama, Poland)	(estab lished in 2013 in Thailand)	(estab lished in 1971 in Panama, Germany)	(estab lished in 2004 in Albania)	(estab lished in 2023 in Vietnam)	(estab lished in 2024 in Vietnam)	(estab lished in 2015 in Egypt)	(estab lished in 2013 in United States, 2025 in Thailand))	(estab lished in 1993 in Miami)	(estab lished in 1965 in Phili ppines, (changed to current name in 2005)	(estab lished in 2006 in Turkey, (changed to current name in 2019)	(estab lished in 1994 in Malaysia)	(estab lished in 2019 in Cambo dia)	(estab lished in 2012 in New Zealand)	(estab lished in 2026 in Thailand)	(estab lished in 2027 in Philippines)
1951	(estab lished in 1952 in United States, 2023 in Thailand)	×	(estab lished in 1960 in California, United States and then it was transferred in 1968 in Tokyo, Japan)	(estab lished in 2001 in Manila, Philippines)	(estab lished in 2009 in Panama, Poland)	(estab lished in 2013 in Thailand)	(estab lished in 1971 in Panama, Germany)	(estab lished in 2004 in Albania)	(estab lished in 2023 in Vietnam)	(estab lished in 2024 in Vietnam)	(estab lished in 2015 in Egypt)	(estab lished in 2013 in United States, 2025 in Thailand))	(estab lished in 1993 in Miami)	(estab lished in 1965 in Phili ppines, (changed to current name in 2005)	(estab lished in 2006 in Turkey, (changed to current name in 2019)	(estab lished in 1994 in Malaysia)	(estab lished in 2019 in Cambo dia)	(estab lished in 2012 in New Zealand)	(estab lished in 2026 in Thailand)	(estab lished in 2027 in Philippines)
1950	(estab lished in 1952 in United States, 2023 in Thailand)	(estab lished in 1951 in England, United Kingdom)	(estab lished in 1960 in California, United States and then it was transferred in 1968 in Tokyo, Japan)	(estab lished in 2001 in Manila, Philippines)	(estab lished in 2009 in Panama, Poland)	(estab lished in 2013 in Thailand)	(estab lished in 1971 in Panama, Germany)	(estab lished in 2004 in Albania)	(estab lished in 2023 in Vietnam)	(estab lished in 2024 in Vietnam)	(estab lished in 2015 in Egypt)	(estab lished in 2013 in United States, 2025 in Thailand))	(estab lished in 1993 in Miami)	(estab lished in 1965 in Phili ppines, (changed to current name in 2005)	(estab lished in 2006 in Turkey, (changed to current name in 2019)	(estab lished in 1994 in Malaysia)	(estab lished in 2019 in Cambo dia)	(estab lished in 2012 in New Zealand)	(estab lished in 2026 in Thailand)	(estab lished in 2027 in Philippines)

× Did not compete
↑ No pageant held

Name of Pageant	Placements	Best Result
Miss Universe	8	1st Runner-up (1988)
Miss World	11	1st Runner-up (1988)
Miss International	26	1st Runner-up (2000, 2009)
Miss Earth	10	Winner (2022)
Miss Supranational	3	Winner (2017)
Miss Grand International	1	Top 10 (2016)
Miss Intercontinental	8	1st Runner-up (2007)
The Miss Globe	1	Top 15 (2015)
Miss Charm	1	Top 20 (2023)
Miss Cosmo International	0	Summit Top 26 (2025)
Miss Eco International	0	Asia (2019)
Miss Global	5	Top 20 (2018)
Top Model of the World	2	Top 16 (2025)
Miss Asia Pacific International	16	Winner (1969, 1995, 2002)
Miss Aura International	1	Top 20 (2024)
Miss Tourism International	2	2nd Runner-up (1994)
Miss Planet International	2	Top 16 (2019)
Face of Beauty International	3	Top 15 (2026)
MGI All Stars	0	Did not compete
Woman of the World	0	No pageant held
Total	100	5 TITLE (2022) (Miss Earth), (2017) (Miss Supranational), (1969, 1995, 2002) (Miss Asia Pacific International)

== List of Korea representatives at international male beauty pageants ==
This is a list of South Korea's representatives and their placements at the male beauty pageant considered.

International Crowns

- One — Mister International 2017
- One — Mister Global 2019
- Two — Man of the World 2019, 2023
- One — Man of the Year 2019
- One — Mister Friendship International 2022
- One — Man Hot Star International 2025

== The franchise holders of the area ==
Franchise
List
- === Current ===
  - Manhunt Korea – Manhunt International (2020–present)
  - Mister World Korea – Mister World (2014–present)
  - Mister International Korea – Mister International (2007–present), Mister Global (2014–present), Mister Supranational (2018–present), Man of the World (2017–present), Mister Cosmo (2026–present), Man of the Year (2018–present), Mister Friendship International (2021–present), Mister Cosmopolitan (2023–present), Mister Eco International (2026–present).
  === Past ===
  - M.B.International, Korea Organizing Committee, Kangwon Land – Manhunt International (2005–2008).
  - Cheong Cinema – Manhunt International (2011).
  - Hankook Ilbo – Manhunt International (2010), Mister World (2010).
  - Mister International Korea – Mister Grand International (2023), Mister Universe Tourism (2025), Mister Model International (2016), Mister Tourism World (2018), Mister National Universe (2022), Man Hot Star International (2022–2024).
  - First Foundation – Man of the Earth (2021).

== Summary ==
Color keys

- : Declared as Winner
- : Ended as runner-up
- : Ended as top 5/6 qualification
- : Ended as one of the finalists or semi-finalists
- : Ended as special award winner

YEAR	MAN HUNT INTER NATIONAL	MISTER WORLD	MISTER INTER NATIONAL	MISTER GLOBAL	MISTER SUPRA NATIONAL	MAN OF THE WORLD	MISTER COSMO	MISTER GRAND	MISTER TOURISM WORLD	MISTER MODEL	MAN OF THE YEAR	MISTER FRIEND SHIP	MISTER NATIONAL UNIVERSE	MAN HOT STAR	MISTER COSMO POLITAN	MISTER UNIVERSE TOURISM	THE MISTER UNIVERSE	MAN OF THE EARTH	MISTER ECO INTER NATIONAL	MISTER EARTH INTER NATIONAL
2027	TBA	TBA	TBA	TBA	Jung Myeong-cheol; TBA	Shin Sang-min; TBA	Lee Jong-hyun; TBA	TBA	TBA	TBA	TBA	TBA	TBA	TBA	TBA	TBA	TBA	TBA	Park Jin-hyunk; TBA	TBA
2026	William Sin Kyu; 8th r-up	↑No Pageant Held	Park Jung-gyu; Top 10	Lee Jeong-chan; Top 20	Kim Tae-woo (Top 10 - Supra Chat)	Choi Ju-sung ×	(estab lished in 2027 in Vietnam)	↑No Pageant Held	TBA	×	Kim Jae-yoon; TBA	Kim Woo-hyeuk; TBA	×	Shin Heyon Kyu; TBA	Lee Seung-jae (Talent)	↑No Pageant Held	Xavier Callicott; TBA	TBA	Na Hyun-seok (Catwalk)	TBA
2025	Minjae Kim (Face)	↑No Pageant Held	Choi Seung-ho; 2nd r-up	Eric Kang; Top 11	Lee Seung-chan (Talent)	Jeon Hyeong-sik (2nd r-up Formal)	(estab lished in 2027 in Vietnam)	↑No Pageant Held	×	×	Kim Jun-hyeok; Lifestyle	Jo Eun-il; Top 16	×	No Seung-hyuk; Winner	Kim Han-young (Catwalk)	↑No Pageant Held	↑No Pageant Held	×	↑No Pageant Held	×
2024	Jang Yoon-sung (Face)	×	Heo Joon-sung; Top 10	Yun Hyun-jae; Top 11	Jo Seong-hyeon (Top 11 - Top Model)	Kim Min-seong (1st r-up Photogenic)	(estab lished in 2027 in Vietnam)	↑No Pageant Held	×	×	Jeon Won-gi; Top 8	Lee Hee-yoon	×	Park Jun-hyoung; 3rd r-up	Shin Jae-min; 3rd r-up	×	Daniel Kim ×	↑No Pageant Held	↑No Pageant Held	×
2023	↑No Pageant Held	↑No Pageant Held	Kang Ho-Sun; Top 20	Lim Jeong-Yun; Top 10	Lee Yong-Woo; 3rd r-up	Kim Jin-Wook; Winner	(estab lished in 2027 in Vietnam)	Hwang Jun-sung; 4th r-up	×	↑No Pageant Held	Seok Bo-geun; Top 8	Ko Jun-hyeok; 5th r-up	Hong Seok-jin ×	Jo Seong-hyeon; 2nd r-up	Lee Ji-hun; Top 8	×	(estab lished in 2024 in United States of America)	↑No Pageant Held	↑No Pageant Held	×
2022	Chang Jun-hyeok (Friend ship)	↑No Pageant Held	Cho Jae-young	Kim Hee Won; Top 5	Han Jung-wan; Top 20	Woo Chang-Wook; Top 10	(estab lished in 2027 in Vietnam)	×	×	↑No Pageant Held	Lee Joo-yong; 3rd r-up	Yoo Byeong-eun; Winner	Kim Dong-hun; 2nd r-up	Ha Joo-young; 2nd r-up, Kim Joo-young; 4th r-up	(estab lished in 2023 in Malaysia)	↑No Pageant Held	(estab lished in 2024 in United States of America)	×	↑No Pageant Held	(estab lished in 2023 in Venezuela)
2021	↑No Pageant Held	↑No Pageant Held	↑No Pageant Held	Shin Dong-Woo; 2nd r-up	Cho Young-dong (Friendship)	↑No Pageant Held	(estab lished in 2027 in Vietnam)	Choi Seo-jun; Top 18	Lee Tae-soon (Friend ship)	×	↑No Pageant Held	Woo Chang-Wook	↑No Pageant Held	(estab lished in 2022 in Thailand)	(estab lished in 2023 in Malaysia)	↑No Pageant Held	(estab lished in 2024 in United States of America)	Park Gyu-sang ×	↑No Pageant Held	(estab lished in 2023 in Venezuela)
2020	Hong Je-min	↑No Pageant Held	↑No Pageant Held	↑No Pageant Held			(estab lished in 2027 in Vietnam)	↑No Pageant Held			↑No Pageant Held	(estab lished in 2021 in Thailand)	↑No Pageant Held	(estab lished in 2022 in Thailand)	(estab lished in 2023 in Malaysia)	↑No Pageant Held	(estab lished in 2024 in United States of America)	(estab lished in 2021 in Nigeria, then it was trans ferred in 2025 in india)	↑No Pageant Held	(estab lished in 2023 in Venezuela)
2019	↑No Pageant Held	Na Gi-wook	↑No Pageant Held	Kim Jong-woo; Winner	Woo Chang-wook	Kim Jin-Kyu; Winner (Appointed)	(estab lished in 2027 in Vietnam)	×	×	×	Lee Ho-jin; Winner	(estab lished in 2021 in Thailand)	×	(estab lished in 2022 in Thailand)	(estab lished in 2023 in Malaysia)	×	(estab lished in 2024 in United States of America)	(estab lished in 2021 in Nigeria, then it was trans ferred in 2025 in india)	↑No Pageant Held	(estab lished in 2023 in Venezuela)
2018	×	↑No Pageant Held	Hwang Dae-woong; Top 15	Kang Doo-hyung; Top 16	Park Cheong-woo	Kim Gil-Hwan; Top 10	(estab lished in 2027 in Vietnam)	Jin Stewart	Baek Jun-hyeon (1st r-up Runway)	×	Jang Yoon-sung; Top 10	(estab lished in 2021 in Thailand)	×	(estab lished in 2022 in Thailand)	(estab lished in 2023 in Malaysia)	Alexander Lau Tailung	(estab lished in 2024 in United States of America)	(estab lished in 2021 in Nigeria, then it was trans ferred in 2025 in india)	↑No Pageant Held; Jang Yoon-sung ×	(estab lished in 2023 in Venezuela)
2017	Kim Seong-Min	↑No Pageant Held	Lee Seung-hwan; Winner	Yoo Su-jae; Top 16	Kim Young-geun ×	Jung Goo-Young; Top 18	(estab lished in 2027 in Vietnam)	×	×	×	×	(estab lished in 2021 in Thailand)	×	(estab lished in 2022 in Thailand)	(estab lished in 2023 in Malaysia)	Jin Stewart; 2nd r-up	(estab lished in 2024 in United States of America)	(estab lished in 2021 in Nigeria, then it was trans ferred in 2025 in india)	(estab lished in 2018 in Egypt)	(estab lished in 2023 in Venezuela)
2016	Han Sang-heon (Best; Stage)	Seo Young-suk	Jung Goo-yeong	Kim Gi-jong; Top 10	×	(estab lished in 2017 in Manila, Philippines)	(estab lished in 2027 in Vietnam)	(estab lished in 2017 in Quezon City, Philippines)	×	Choi Byeong-jun; Top 17	×	(estab lished in 2021 in Thailand)	(estab lished in 2017 in Thailand)	(estab lished in 2022 in Thailand)	(estab lished in 2023 in Malaysia)	(estab lished in 2017 in Philippines)	(estab lished in 2024 in United States of America)	(estab lished in 2021 in Nigeria, then it was trans ferred in 2025 in india)	(estab lished in 2018 in Egypt)	(estab lished in 2023 in Venezuela)
2015	↑No Pageant Held	↑No Pageant Held	Lee Sang-jin; 2nd r-up	Yoon Tae-ho (Model)	(estab lished in 2016 in Poland)	(estab lished in 2017 in Manila, Philippines)	(estab lished in 2027 in Vietnam)	(estab lished in 2017 in Quezon City, Philippines)	(estab lished in 2016 in United King dom)	×	(estab lished in 2016 in Indo nesia)	(estab lished in 2021 in Thailand)	(estab lished in 2017 in Thailand)	(estab lished in 2022 in Thailand)	(estab lished in 2023 in Malaysia)	(estab lished in 2017 in Philippines)	(estab lished in 2024 in United States of America)	(estab lished in 2021 in Nigeria, then it was trans ferred in 2025 in india)	(estab lished in 2018 in Egypt)	(estab lished in 2023 in Venezuela)
2014	↑No Pageant Held	Lim Jae-yeon	Park Young-ho; Top 10	Lee Jun-ho; 2nd r-up	(estab lished in 2016 in Poland)	(estab lished in 2017 in Manila, Philippines)	(estab lished in 2027 in Vietnam)	(estab lished in 2017 in Quezon City, Philippines)	(estab lished in 2016 in United King dom)	×	(estab lished in 2016 in Indo nesia)	(estab lished in 2021 in Thailand)	(estab lished in 2017 in Thailand)	(estab lished in 2022 in Thailand)	(estab lished in 2023 in Malaysia)	(estab lished in 2017 in Philippines)	(estab lished in 2024 in United States of America)	(estab lished in 2021 in Nigeria, then it was trans ferred in 2025 in india)	(estab lished in 2018 in Egypt)	(estab lished in 2023 in Venezuela)
2013	↑No Pageant Held	↑No Pageant Held	Kim Jae-hyuk	(estab lished in 2014 in Thai land)	(estab lished in 2016 in Poland)	(estab lished in 2017 in Manila, Philippines)	(estab lished in 2027 in Vietnam)	(estab lished in 2017 in Quezon City, Philippines)	(estab lished in 2016 in United King dom)	×	(estab lished in 2016 in Indo nesia)	(estab lished in 2021 in Thailand)	(estab lished in 2017 in Thailand)	(estab lished in 2022 in Thailand)	(estab lished in 2023 in Malaysia)	(estab lished in 2017 in Philippines)	(estab lished in 2024 in United States of America)	(estab lished in 2021 in Nigeria, then it was trans ferred in 2025 in india)	(estab lished in 2018 in Egypt)	(estab lished in 2023 in Venezuela)
2012	×	×	Kim Do-yeop; Top 10	(estab lished in 2014 in Thai land)	(estab lished in 2016 in Poland)	(estab lished in 2017 in Manila, Philippines)	(estab lished in 2027 in Vietnam)	(estab lished in 2017 in Quezon City, Philippines)	(estab lished in 2016 in United King dom)	(estab lished in 2013 in United States)	(estab lished in 2016 in Indo nesia)	(estab lished in 2021 in Thailand)	(estab lished in 2017 in Thailand)	(estab lished in 2022 in Thailand)	(estab lished in 2023 in Malaysia)	(estab lished in 2017 in Philippines)	(estab lished in 2024 in United States of America)	(estab lished in 2021 in Nigeria, then it was trans ferred in 2025 in india)	(estab lished in 2018 in Egypt)	(estab lished in 2023 in Venezuela)
2011	Lee Yong-bum; Top 15	↑No Pageant Held	Oh Ji-sung; Top 10	(estab lished in 2014 in Thai land)	(estab lished in 2016 in Poland)	(estab lished in 2017 in Manila, Philippines)	(estab lished in 2027 in Vietnam)	(estab lished in 2017 in Quezon City, Philippines)	(estab lished in 2016 in United King dom)	(estab lished in 2013 in United States)	(estab lished in 2016 in Indo nesia)	(estab lished in 2021 in Thailand)	(estab lished in 2017 in Thailand)	(estab lished in 2022 in Thailand)	(estab lished in 2023 in Malaysia)	(estab lished in 2017 in Philippines)	(estab lished in 2024 in United States of America)	(estab lished in 2021 in Nigeria, then it was trans ferred in 2025 in india)	(estab lished in 2018 in Egypt)	(estab lished in 2023 in Venezuela)
2010	Park Hyun-Woo (Friend ship)	Yoo Ji-kwang; Top 15	Kim Gi-jong	(estab lished in 2014 in Thai land)	(estab lished in 2016 in Poland)	(estab lished in 2017 in Manila, Philippines)	(estab lished in 2027 in Vietnam)	(estab lished in 2017 in Quezon City, Philippines)	(estab lished in 2016 in United King dom)	(estab lished in 2013 in United States)	(estab lished in 2016 in Indo nesia)	(estab lished in 2021 in Thailand)	(estab lished in 2017 in Thailand)	(estab lished in 2022 in Thailand)	(estab lished in 2023 in Malaysia)	(estab lished in 2017 in Philippines)	(estab lished in 2024 in United States of America)	(estab lished in 2021 in Nigeria, then it was trans ferred in 2025 in india)	(estab lished in 2018 in Egypt)	(estab lished in 2023 in Venezuela)
2009	↑No Pageant Held	↑No Pageant Held	Baek Joo-suk	(estab lished in 2014 in Thai land)	(estab lished in 2016 in Poland)	(estab lished in 2017 in Manila, Philippines)	(estab lished in 2027 in Vietnam)	(estab lished in 2017 in Quezon City, Philippines)	(estab lished in 2016 in United King dom)	(estab lished in 2013 in United States)	(estab lished in 2016 in Indo nesia)	(estab lished in 2021 in Thailand)	(estab lished in 2017 in Thailand)	(estab lished in 2022 in Thailand)	(estab lished in 2023 in Malaysia)	(estab lished in 2017 in Philippines)	(estab lished in 2024 in United States of America)	(estab lished in 2021 in Nigeria, then it was trans ferred in 2025 in india)	(estab lished in 2018 in Egypt)	(estab lished in 2023 in Venezuela)
2008	Lee Jae-Hwan; 3rd r-up	↑No Pageant Held	Park Jung-wan	(estab lished in 2014 in Thai land)	(estab lished in 2016 in Poland)	(estab lished in 2017 in Manila, Philippines)	(estab lished in 2027 in Vietnam)	(estab lished in 2017 in Quezon City, Philippines)	(estab lished in 2016 in United King dom)	(estab lished in 2013 in United States)	(estab lished in 2016 in Indo nesia)	(estab lished in 2021 in Thailand)	(estab lished in 2017 in Thailand)	(estab lished in 2022 in Thailand)	(estab lished in 2023 in Malaysia)	(estab lished in 2017 in Philippines)	(estab lished in 2024 in United States of America)	(estab lished in 2021 in Nigeria, then it was trans ferred in 2025 in india)	(estab lished in 2018 in Egypt)	(estab lished in 2023 in Venezuela)
2007	Jeong Ju-seop; Top 16	×	Oh Jong-sung; 1st r-up	(estab lished in 2014 in Thai land)	(estab lished in 2016 in Poland)	(estab lished in 2017 in Manila, Philippines)	(estab lished in 2027 in Vietnam)	(estab lished in 2017 in Quezon City, Philippines)	(estab lished in 2016 in United King dom)	(estab lished in 2013 in United States)	(estab lished in 2016 in Indo nesia)	(estab lished in 2021 in Thailand)	(estab lished in 2017 in Thailand)	(estab lished in 2022 in Thailand)	(estab lished in 2023 in Malaysia)	(estab lished in 2017 in Philippines)	(estab lished in 2024 in United States of America)	(estab lished in 2021 in Nigeria, then it was trans ferred in 2025 in india)	(estab lished in 2018 in Egypt)	(estab lished in 2023 in Venezuela)
2006	Shin Ho-chul (1st r-up Asia)	↑No Pageant Held	×	(estab lished in 2014 in Thai land)	(estab lished in 2016 in Poland)	(estab lished in 2017 in Manila, Philippines)	(estab lished in 2027 in Vietnam)	(estab lished in 2017 in Quezon City, Philippines)	(estab lished in 2016 in United King dom)	(estab lished in 2013 in United States)	(estab lished in 2016 in Indo nesia)	(estab lished in 2021 in Thailand)	(estab lished in 2017 in Thailand)	(estab lished in 2022 in Thailand)	(estab lished in 2023 in Malaysia)	(estab lished in 2017 in Philippines)	(estab lished in 2024 in United States of America)	(estab lished in 2021 in Nigeria, then it was trans ferred in 2025 in india)	(estab lished in 2018 in Egypt)	(estab lished in 2023 in Venezuela)
2005	Lee Seung-Hwan; Top 15	↑No Pageant Held	(estab lished in 2006 in Singapore, then it was transferred in 2022 in Thailand)	(estab lished in 2014 in Thai land)	(estab lished in 2016 in Poland)	(estab lished in 2017 in Manila, Philippines)	(estab lished in 2027 in Vietnam)	(estab lished in 2017 in Quezon City, Philippines)	(estab lished in 2016 in United King dom)	(estab lished in 2013 in United States)	(estab lished in 2016 in Indo nesia)	(estab lished in 2021 in Thailand)	(estab lished in 2017 in Thailand)	(estab lished in 2022 in Thailand)	(estab lished in 2023 in Malaysia)	(estab lished in 2017 in Philippines)	(estab lished in 2024 in United States of America)	(estab lished in 2021 in Nigeria, then it was trans ferred in 2025 in india)	(estab lished in 2018 in Egypt)	(estab lished in 2023 in Venezuela)
2004	↑No Pageant Held	↑No Pageant Held	(estab lished in 2006 in Singapore, then it was transferred in 2022 in Thailand)	(estab lished in 2014 in Thai land)	(estab lished in 2016 in Poland)	(estab lished in 2017 in Manila, Philippines)	(estab lished in 2027 in Vietnam)	(estab lished in 2017 in Quezon City, Philippines)	(estab lished in 2016 in United King dom)	(estab lished in 2013 in United States)	(estab lished in 2016 in Indo nesia)	(estab lished in 2021 in Thailand)	(estab lished in 2017 in Thailand)	(estab lished in 2022 in Thailand)	(estab lished in 2023 in Malaysia)	(estab lished in 2017 in Philippines)	(estab lished in 2024 in United States of America)	(estab lished in 2021 in Nigeria, then it was trans ferred in 2025 in india)	(estab lished in 2018 in Egypt)	(estab lished in 2023 in Venezuela)
2003	↑No Pageant Held	×	(estab lished in 2006 in Singapore, then it was transferred in 2022 in Thailand)	(estab lished in 2014 in Thai land)	(estab lished in 2016 in Poland)	(estab lished in 2017 in Manila, Philippines)	(estab lished in 2027 in Vietnam)	(estab lished in 2017 in Quezon City, Philippines)	(estab lished in 2016 in United King dom)	(estab lished in 2013 in United States)	(estab lished in 2016 in Indo nesia)	(estab lished in 2021 in Thailand)	(estab lished in 2017 in Thailand)	(estab lished in 2022 in Thailand)	(estab lished in 2023 in Malaysia)	(estab lished in 2017 in Philippines)	(estab lished in 2024 in United States of America)	(estab lished in 2021 in Nigeria, then it was trans ferred in 2025 in india)	(estab lished in 2018 in Egypt)	(estab lished in 2023 in Venezuela)
2002	×	↑No Pageant Held	(estab lished in 2006 in Singapore, then it was transferred in 2022 in Thailand)	(estab lished in 2014 in Thai land)	(estab lished in 2016 in Poland)	(estab lished in 2017 in Manila, Philippines)	(estab lished in 2027 in Vietnam)	(estab lished in 2017 in Quezon City, Philippines)	(estab lished in 2016 in United King dom)	(estab lished in 2013 in United States)	(estab lished in 2016 in Indo nesia)	(estab lished in 2021 in Thailand)	(estab lished in 2017 in Thailand)	(estab lished in 2022 in Thailand)	(estab lished in 2023 in Malaysia)	(estab lished in 2017 in Philippines)	(estab lished in 2024 in United States of America)	(estab lished in 2021 in Nigeria, then it was trans ferred in 2025 in india)	(estab lished in 2018 in Egypt)	(estab lished in 2023 in Venezuela)
2001	×	↑No Pageant Held	(estab lished in 2006 in Singapore, then it was transferred in 2022 in Thailand)	(estab lished in 2014 in Thai land)	(estab lished in 2016 in Poland)	(estab lished in 2017 in Manila, Philippines)	(estab lished in 2027 in Vietnam)	(estab lished in 2017 in Quezon City, Philippines)	(estab lished in 2016 in United King dom)	(estab lished in 2013 in United States)	(estab lished in 2016 in Indo nesia)	(estab lished in 2021 in Thailand)	(estab lished in 2017 in Thailand)	(estab lished in 2022 in Thailand)	(estab lished in 2023 in Malaysia)	(estab lished in 2017 in Philippines)	(estab lished in 2024 in United States of America)	(estab lished in 2021 in Nigeria, then it was trans ferred in 2025 in india)	(estab lished in 2018 in Egypt)	(estab lished in 2023 in Venezuela)
2000	×	×	(estab lished in 2006 in Singapore, then it was transferred in 2022 in Thailand)	(estab lished in 2014 in Thai land)	(estab lished in 2016 in Poland)	(estab lished in 2017 in Manila, Philippines)	(estab lished in 2027 in Vietnam)	(estab lished in 2017 in Quezon City, Philippines)	(estab lished in 2016 in United King dom)	(estab lished in 2013 in United States)	(estab lished in 2016 in Indo nesia)	(estab lished in 2021 in Thailand)	(estab lished in 2017 in Thailand)	(estab lished in 2022 in Thailand)	(estab lished in 2023 in Malaysia)	(estab lished in 2017 in Philippines)	(estab lished in 2024 in United States of America)	(estab lished in 2021 in Nigeria, then it was trans ferred in 2025 in india)	(estab lished in 2018 in Egypt)	(estab lished in 2023 in Venezuela)
1999	×	↑No Pageant Held	(estab lished in 2006 in Singapore, then it was transferred in 2022 in Thailand)	(estab lished in 2014 in Thai land)	(estab lished in 2016 in Poland)	(estab lished in 2017 in Manila, Philippines)	(estab lished in 2027 in Vietnam)	(estab lished in 2017 in Quezon City, Philippines)	(estab lished in 2016 in United King dom)	(estab lished in 2013 in United States)	(estab lished in 2016 in Indo nesia)	(estab lished in 2021 in Thailand)	(estab lished in 2017 in Thailand)	(estab lished in 2022 in Thailand)	(estab lished in 2023 in Malaysia)	(estab lished in 2017 in Philippines)	(estab lished in 2024 in United States of America)	(estab lished in 2021 in Nigeria, then it was trans ferred in 2025 in india)	(estab lished in 2018 in Egypt)	(estab lished in 2023 in Venezuela)
1998	×	×	(estab lished in 2006 in Singapore, then it was transferred in 2022 in Thailand)	(estab lished in 2014 in Thai land)	(estab lished in 2016 in Poland)	(estab lished in 2017 in Manila, Philippines)	(estab lished in 2027 in Vietnam)	(estab lished in 2017 in Quezon City, Philippines)	(estab lished in 2016 in United King dom)	(estab lished in 2013 in United States)	(estab lished in 2016 in Indo nesia)	(estab lished in 2021 in Thailand)	(estab lished in 2017 in Thailand)	(estab lished in 2022 in Thailand)	(estab lished in 2023 in Malaysia)	(estab lished in 2017 in Philippines)	(estab lished in 2024 in United States of America)	(estab lished in 2021 in Nigeria, then it was trans ferred in 2025 in india)	(estab lished in 2018 in Egypt)	(estab lished in 2023 in Venezuela)
1997	×	↑No Pageant Held	(estab lished in 2006 in Singapore, then it was transferred in 2022 in Thailand)	(estab lished in 2014 in Thai land)	(estab lished in 2016 in Poland)	(estab lished in 2017 in Manila, Philippines)	(estab lished in 2027 in Vietnam)	(estab lished in 2017 in Quezon City, Philippines)	(estab lished in 2016 in United King dom)	(estab lished in 2013 in United States)	(estab lished in 2016 in Indo nesia)	(estab lished in 2021 in Thailand)	(estab lished in 2017 in Thailand)	(estab lished in 2022 in Thailand)	(estab lished in 2023 in Malaysia)	(estab lished in 2017 in Philippines)	(estab lished in 2024 in United States of America)	(estab lished in 2021 in Nigeria, then it was trans ferred in 2025 in india)	(estab lished in 2018 in Egypt)	(estab lished in 2023 in Venezuela)
1996	↑No Pageant Held	×	(estab lished in 2006 in Singapore, then it was transferred in 2022 in Thailand)	(estab lished in 2014 in Thai land)	(estab lished in 2016 in Poland)	(estab lished in 2017 in Manila, Philippines)	(estab lished in 2027 in Vietnam)	(estab lished in 2017 in Quezon City, Philippines)	(estab lished in 2016 in United King dom)	(estab lished in 2013 in United States)	(estab lished in 2016 in Indo nesia)	(estab lished in 2021 in Thailand)	(estab lished in 2017 in Thailand)	(estab lished in 2022 in Thailand)	(estab lished in 2023 in Malaysia)	(estab lished in 2017 in Philippines)	(estab lished in 2024 in United States of America)	(estab lished in 2021 in Nigeria, then it was trans ferred in 2025 in india)	(estab lished in 2018 in Egypt)	(estab lished in 2023 in Venezuela)
1995	×	(estab lished in 1996 in England)	(estab lished in 2006 in Singapore, then it was transferred in 2022 in Thailand)	(estab lished in 2014 in Thai land)	(estab lished in 2016 in Poland)	(estab lished in 2017 in Manila, Philippines)	(estab lished in 2027 in Vietnam)	(estab lished in 2017 in Quezon City, Philippines)	(estab lished in 2016 in United King dom)	(estab lished in 2013 in United States)	(estab lished in 2016 in Indo nesia)	(estab lished in 2021 in Thailand)	(estab lished in 2017 in Thailand)	(estab lished in 2022 in Thailand)	(estab lished in 2023 in Malaysia)	(estab lished in 2017 in Philippines)	(estab lished in 2024 in United States of America)	(estab lished in 2021 in Nigeria, then it was trans ferred in 2025 in india)	(estab lished in 2018 in Egypt)	(estab lished in 2023 in Venezuela)
1994	×	(estab lished in 1996 in England)	(estab lished in 2006 in Singapore, then it was transferred in 2022 in Thailand)	(estab lished in 2014 in Thai land)	(estab lished in 2016 in Poland)	(estab lished in 2017 in Manila, Philippines)	(estab lished in 2027 in Vietnam)	(estab lished in 2017 in Quezon City, Philippines)	(estab lished in 2016 in United King dom)	(estab lished in 2013 in United States)	(estab lished in 2016 in Indo nesia)	(estab lished in 2021 in Thailand)	(estab lished in 2017 in Thailand)	(estab lished in 2022 in Thailand)	(estab lished in 2023 in Malaysia)	(estab lished in 2017 in Philippines)	(estab lished in 2024 in United States of America)	(estab lished in 2021 in Nigeria, then it was trans ferred in 2025 in india)	(estab lished in 2018 in Egypt)	(estab lished in 2023 in Venezuela)
1993	×	(estab lished in 1996 in England)	(estab lished in 2006 in Singapore, then it was transferred in 2022 in Thailand)	(estab lished in 2014 in Thai land)	(estab lished in 2016 in Poland)	(estab lished in 2017 in Manila, Philippines)	(estab lished in 2027 in Vietnam)	(estab lished in 2017 in Quezon City, Philippines)	(estab lished in 2016 in United King dom)	(estab lished in 2013 in United States)	(estab lished in 2016 in Indo nesia)	(estab lished in 2021 in Thailand)	(estab lished in 2017 in Thailand)	(estab lished in 2022 in Thailand)	(estab lished in 2023 in Malaysia)	(estab lished in 2017 in Philippines)	(estab lished in 2024 in United States of America)	(estab lished in 2021 in Nigeria, then it was trans ferred in 2025 in india)	(estab lished in 2018 in Egypt)	(estab lished in 2023 in Venezuela)
1992	(estab lished in 1993 in Singapore, then it was transferred in 2018 in Australia)	(estab lished in 1996 in England)	(estab lished in 2006 in Singapore, then it was transferred in 2022 in Thailand)	(estab lished in 2014 in Thai land)	(estab lished in 2016 in Poland)	(estab lished in 2017 in Manila, Philippines)	(estab lished in 2027 in Vietnam)	(estab lished in 2017 in Quezon City, Philippines)	(estab lished in 2016 in United King dom)	(estab lished in 2013 in United States)	(estab lished in 2016 in Indo nesia)	(estab lished in 2021 in Thailand)	(estab lished in 2017 in Thailand)	(estab lished in 2022 in Thailand)	(estab lished in 2023 in Malaysia)	(estab lished in 2017 in Philippines)	(estab lished in 2024 in United States of America)	(estab lished in 2021 in Nigeria, then it was trans ferred in 2025 in india)	(estab lished in 2018 in Egypt)	(estab lished in 2023 in Venezuela)

× Did not compete
↑ No pageant held

Name of Pageant	Placements	Best Result
Manhunt International	5	3rd Runner-up (2008)
Mister World	1	Top 15 (2010)
Mister International	11	Winner (2017)
Mister Global	11	Winner (2019)
Mister Supranational	2	3rd Runner-up (2023)
Man of the World	5	Winner (2019, 2023)
Mister Cosmo International	0	No pageant held
Mister Grand International	2	4th Runner-up (2023)
Mister Tourism World	0	Friendship (2021)
Mister Model International	1	Top 17 (2016)
Man of the Year	5	Winner (2019)
Mister Friendship International	3	Winner (2022)
Mister National Universe	1	2nd Runner-up (2022)
Man Hot Star International	5	Winner (2025)
Mister Cosmopolitan	2	3rd Runner-up (2024)
Mister Universe Tourism	1	2nd Runner-up (2017)
The Mister Universe	0	Did not compete
Man of the Earth	0	Did not compete
Mister Eco International	0	Catwalk (2026)
Mister Earth International	0	Did not compete
Total	55	7 TITLE (2017) (Mister International), (2019) (Mister Global), (2019, 2023)(Man of the World), (2019) (Man of the Year), (2022) (Mister Friendship International), (2025) (Man Hot Star International)

== See also ==
- Miss Korea
- Miss Queen Korea
- Miss Grand Korea
- Mister World Korea
- Mister International Korea
- Mister Korea
- Miss International Korea
- Miss Earth Korea
- Miss Universe Korea Representative
- Miss and Mister World Korea
- Miss and Mister Supranational Korea
