= List of Korean representatives at international male beauty pageants =

Beauty contest

Mister Korea 미스터 코리아
- Formation: 2005; 21 years ago
- Type: Beauty pageant
- Headquarters: Seoul
- Location: South Korea
- Members: Manhunt International; Mister World; Mister International; Mister Global; Mister Supranational; Man of the World
- Official language: Korean

This is a list of South Korea's representatives and their placements at the male beauty pageant considered.

== History ==
Manhunt Korea is an annual national male beauty pageant responsible for selecting South Korea's representatives to the Manhunt International.

In 2009, Hankook Ilbo sent first Mister World contestant who is represent Korea. It has been selected by Miss and Mister World Korea since 2014.

Mister International Korea is an annual national male beauty pageant responsible for selecting South Korea's representatives to the Mister International, Mister Global, Mister Supranational, Man of the World.

== International Crownst ==
Name of Pageant	Title	Year	Winner
Mister International	1	2017	Lee Seung-hwan
Mister Global	1	2019	Kim Jong-woo
Man of the World	2		
Man of the World	2	2019	Kim Jin-kyu
Man of the World	2	2023	Kim Jin-wook

== Male beauty pageants ==
Color key

- Declared as Winner
- Ended as runner-up
- Ended as top 5/6 qualification
- Ended as one of the finalists or semi-finalists
- Ended as special awards

=== Manhunt International ===
Korea debuted at Manhunt International in 2005.

Year	Delegate	International Placement & Performance	
Year	Delegate	Placements	Special award(s)
Did not compete between 1993 and 2002
2005	Lee Seung-Hwan	Top 15	1 Special Awards: Asia
2006	Shin Ho-chul	Non-Finalist	1 Special Awards: 1st r-up Asia
2007	Jeong Ju Seop	Top 16	1 Special Awards: Best Runway Model
2008	Lee Jae-Hwan	3rd Runner-up	
2010	Park Hyun Woo: Mister World Korea 2009 1st r-up	Non-Finalist	2 Special Awards: Mr. Friendship; Dress Popularity Award
2011	Yongbum Lee	Top 15 (8th Place)	1 Special Awards: Mr. Talent
2012	Did not compete in 2012		
2016	Han Sangheon	Non-Finalist	1 Special Awards: Best Stage TV Movie
2016	Choi Duck-won (Jeju)	Non-Finalist	
2017	Kim Seong Min	Non-Finalist	
2020	Hong Je-min	Non-Finalist	
Due to the impact of COVID-19 pandemic, no pageant
2022	Chang Jun-hyeok	Non-Finalist	1 Special Awards: Mr. Friendship
2024	Jang Yoon-sung: Mister International Korea 2017 Top 11 & Photogenic Award	Non-Finalist	2 Special Awards: Face of the Year; Top 5 – Casting Digital Challenge
2025	Minjae Kim	Non-Finalist	1 Special Awards: Face of the Year
2026	William Sin Kyu	Top 10 (8th Runner-up)	1 Special Awards: Best in Formal Award

=== Mister World ===
Korea debuted at Mister World in 2010.

Year	Delegate	International Placement & Performance	
Year	Delegate	Placements	Special award(s)
Did not compete between 1996 and 2007
2010	Yoo Ji-kwang	Top 15 (7th Place)	2 Special Awards: Mister World Talent; Top 20 – Mister World Top Model
2012	Did not compete in 2012		
2014	Lim Jae-yeon	Non-Finalist	
2016	Seo Young-suk	Non-Finalist	
2019	Na Gi-wook: Mister International Korea 2018 Top 13 & Best Model Award	Non-Finalist	
Due to the impact of COVID-19 pandemic, no pageant
2024	Did not compete in 2024		

=== Mister International ===
Korea debuted at Mister International in 2007.

Year	Delegate	International Placement & Performance	
Year	Delegate	Placements	Special award(s)
2006	Did not compete in 2006		
2007	Oh Jong-sung	1st Runner-up	
2008	Park Jung-wan: Elite Model Korea 2007	Non-Finalist	
2009	Baek Joo-suk: Biotherm & Ceci Model 2009	Non-Finalist	
2010	Kim Gi-jong	Non-Finalist	
2011	Oh Ji-sung	Top 10	1 Special Awards: Most Cute Man Award
2012	Kim Do-yeop	Top 10	
2013	Kim Jae-hyuk	Non-Finalist	
2014	Park Young-ho	Top 10	1 Special Awards: Most Stylish Award
2015	Lee Sang-jin	2nd Runners-up	
2016	Jung Goo-yeong	Non-Finalist	
2017	Lee Seung-hwan	Mister International 2017	
2018	Hwang Dae-woong	Top 15	1 Special Awards: Top 10 - Best in National Costume
Due to the impact of COVID-19 pandemic, no pageant
2022	Cho Jae-young	Non-Finalist	
2023	Kang Ho-sun	Top 20	1 Special Awards: Smart Guy
2024	Heo Joon-sung	Top 10	
2025	Choi Seung-ho	2nd Runners-up	3 Special Awards: Herb Gold - Earth Gold Bright Skin Award; Xpedition - Star of the Night Award; Top 5 - Best in Swimwear
2026	Park Jung-gyu	Top 10	1 Special Awards: Top 12 - King of Andaman

=== Mister Global ===
Korea debuted at Mister Global in 2014.

Year	Delegate	International Placement & Performance	
Year	Delegate	Placements	Special award(s)
2014	Lee Jun-ho	2nd Runners-up	2 Special Awards: Mister Physique; Top 5 - Best in Talent
2015	Yoon Tae-ho	Non-Finalist	1 Special Awards: Best Model
2016	Kim Gi-jong	Top 10	
2017	Yoo Su-jae	Top 16	1 Special Awards: Mister Congeniality
2018	Kang Doo-hyung	Top 16 (Top 10)	2 Special Awards: Best Physique; Top 5 - Best in Talent
2019	Kim Jong-woo	Mister Global 2019	
2020	Yoon Chi-ho	COVID-19 pandemic, no pageant	
2021	Shin Dong-woo	2nd Runners-up	2 Special Awards: Herb Gold Ambassador; Runners-up - Mister Na Chuek Favorite
2022	Kim Hee-won	Top 5	3 Special Awards: Looker Thailand; Best Charming Smile; 2nd r-up - Herb Gold
2023	Lim Jeong-yun	Top 10	2 Special Awards: Mister Congeniality; Kaeng Leng
2024	Yun Hyun-jae	Top 11	
2025	Eric Kang	Top 11	1 Special Awards: 1st r-up - Mister Popularity
2026	Lee Jeong-chan	Top 20	

=== Mister Supranational ===
Korea debuted at Mister Supranational in 2018.

Year	Delegate	International Placement & Performance	
Year	Delegate	Placements	Special award(s)
2016	Did not compete in 2016		
2017	Kim Young-geun	Did not compete	
2018	Park Cheong-woo	Non-Finalist	
2019	Woo Chang-wook	Non-Finalist	
2020	Due to the impact of COVID-19 pandemic, no pageant		
2021	Cho Young-dong	Non-Finalist	2 Special Awards: Mister Friendship; Top 10 - Mister Influencer
2022	Han Jung-wan	Top 20 (11th place)	4 Special Awards: Supra Chat; Top 5 - Top Model; Top 10 - Mister Influencer; Top 10 - Mister Talent
2023	Lee Yong-woo	3rd Runner-up	1 Special Awards: Top Model
2024	Jo Seong-hyeon	Non-Finalist	2 Special Awards: Top 10 - Supra Fan-Vote; Top 11 - Top Model
2025	Lee Seung-chan	Non-Finalist	1 Special Awards: Mister Talent
2026	Kim Tae-woo	Non-Finalist	1 Special Awards: Top 10 - Supra Chat
2027	Jung Myeong-cheol	TBA	TBA

=== Man of the World ===
Korea debuted at Man of the World in 2017.

Year	Delegate	International Placement & Performance	
Year	Delegate	Placements	Special award(s)
2017	Jung Goo-young	Top 18	
2018	Kim Gil-hwan	Top 10	1 Special Awards: (silver) Best in Resort Wear
2019	Kim Jin-kyu	Man of the World 2019 (Appointed)	5 Special Awards: SHA-WRAPS Ambassador; Dipolog City People's Choice; (gold) Best in Formal Wear; (silver) Fashion of the World; (bronze) Best in Swimwear
2020	Moon Tae-joon	COVID-19 pandemic, no pageant	
2022	Woo Chang-wook	Top 10	2 Special Awards: (gold) Fashion of the World; (bronze) Mr. Congeality
2023	Kim Jin-wook	Man of the World 2023	7 Special Awards: (gold) Mister Congeniality; (gold) Best in Beachwear; (gold) Best in Formal Wear; (silver) Fashion of the World; (bronze) Best in Swimwear; (bronze) Mister Photogenic; Top 10 - Best Physique
2024	Kim Min-seong	Non-Finalist	4 Special Awards: (silver) Mister Photogenic; Top 10 - Best in Swimwear; Top 10 - Best in Beachwear; Top 10 - Mister Personality
2025	Jeon Hyeong-sik	Non-Finalist	4 Special Awards: (bronze) Best in Formal Wear; Top 10 - Mister Photogenic; Top 10 - Mister Personality; Top 10 - Mister Congeniality
2026	Choi Ju-sung	Did not compete	
2027	Shin Sang-min	TBA	TBA

== See also ==
- Miss Korea
- Miss Queen Korea
- Miss Grand Korea
- Miss Earth Korea
- Mister World Korea
- Mister International Korea
- Miss Universe Korea Representative
- Miss and Mister World Korea
- Miss and Mister Korea beauty pageants
- Miss International Korea
- Miss and Mister Supranational Korea
