= Miss Universe Korea Representative =

Beauty contest

Miss Universe Korea 미스 유니버스 코리아
- Formation: 1954; 72 years ago
- Type: Beauty pageant
- Headquarters: Seoul
- Location: South Korea
- Members: Miss Universe
- Official language: Korean
- President: Park Jeong-ah
- Website: http://www.missuniversekorea.co.kr

Miss Universe Korea licensee

Miss Universe Korea (Korean: 미스 유니버스 코리아) is a national beauty pageant in South Korea.

== History ==
Korea debuted at Miss Universe in 1954. In 1957 the first Miss Korea competition took place in 1957 and was sponsored by the Korean newspaper Hankook Ilbo. In 1957, Hankook Ilbo sent Miss Universe contestant who represents Korea. Since 2016, Korean representatives at Miss Universe have been chosen in a separate pageant, Miss Universe Korea, and the Miss Korea Organization no longer sends South Korea's representative to Miss Universe.

== International beauty pageants ==
Color key

- Declared as Winner
- Ended as runner-up
- Ended as top 5/6 qualification
- Ended as one of the finalists or semi-finalists
- Ended as special awards

=== Miss Universe ===
Year	Delegate	International Placement & Performance	
Year	Delegate	Placements	Special award(s)
1952	Did not compete in 1952		
Joongang Ilbo — a franchise to Miss Universe from 1953
1953	Kang Gui-hee	Did not compete	
1954	Kye Sun-hee	Non-Finalist	
1955	Kim Mee-chong	Non-Finalist	
1956	Did not compete in 1956.		
Miss Korea — a franchise to Miss Universe from 1957
1957	Park Hyun-ok	Non-Finalist	
1958	Oh Geum-sun	Non-Finalist	
1959	Oh Hyun-ju	Top 15 (6th Place)	Most popular girl; Speech Award; Sportsmanship Award; Honorable Mention Award; Best Dress Award (LA Designers Association)
1960	Son Mi-hee-ja	Top 15	
1961	Seo Yang-hee	Top 15	
1962	Seo Bum-ju	Top 15	Best National Costume (Top 5)
1963	Kim Myoung-ja	4th Runner-up	
1964	Shin Jung-hyun	Non-Finalist	
1965	Kim Eun-ji	Non-Finalist	
1966	Yoon Gui-hyun	Non-Finalist	
1967	Hong Joung-ae	Non-Finalist	
1968	Kim Yoon-jung	Non-Finalist	
1969	Lim Hyun-jung	Non-Finalist	
1970	Yoo Young-ae	Non-Finalist	
1971	Noh Mi-ae	Non-Finalist	
1972	Park Yeon-joo	Non-Finalist	
1973	Kim Young-ju	Non-Finalist	
1974	Kim Eun-jung	Non-Finalist	Best National Costume
1975	Seo Ji-hye	Non-Finalist	
1976	Chung Kwang-hyun	Non-Finalist	
1977	Kim Sung-hee	Non-Finalist	Best National Costume
1978	Son Jung-eun	Non-Finalist	Best National Costume (1st Runner-up)
1979	Seo Jae-hwa	Non-Finalist	
1980	Kim Eun-jung	Top 12	
1981	Lee Eun-jung	Non-Finalist	Best National Costume (2nd Runner-up)
1982	Park Sun-hee	Non-Finalist	
1983	Kim Jong-jung	Non-Finalist	Best National Costume
1984	Lim Mi-sook	Non-Finalist	
1985	Choi Young-ok	Non-Finalist	
1986	Bae Young-ran	Non-Finalist	
1987	Kim Ji-eun	Non-Finalist	
1988	Jang Yoon-jeong	1st Runner-up	
1989	Kim Sung-ryung	Non-Finalist	
1990	Oh Hyun-kyung	Non-Finalist	
1991	Seo Jung-min	Non-Finalist	
1992	Lee Young-hyun	Non-Finalist	
1993	Yoo Ha-young	Non-Finalist	
1994	Goong Sun-young	Non-Finalist	Special Diplomas
1995	Han Sung-ju	Non-Finalist	
1996	Kim Yun-jung	Non-Finalist	
1997	Lee Eun-hee	Non-Finalist	
1998	Kim Ji-yeon	Non-Finalist	
1999	Choi Ji-hyun	Non-Finalist	
2000	Kim Yeon-ju	Non-Finalist	
2001	Kim Sa-rang	Non-Finalist	Best National Costume
2002	Kim Min-kyoung	Non-Finalist	
2003	Keum Na-na	Non-Finalist	
2004	Choi Yun-young	Non-Finalist	
2005	Kim So-young	Non-Finalist	
2006	Kim Joo-hee	Non-Finalist	
2007	Lee Ha-nui	3rd Runner-up	
2008	Lee Ji-sun	Non-Finalist	
2009	Na Ry	Non-Finalist	
2010	Kim Joo-ri	Non-Finalist	
2011	Chong So-ra	Non-Finalist	
2012	Lee Sung-hye	Non-Finalist	
2013	Kim Yu-mi	Non-Finalist	
2014	Yoo Ye-bin	Non-Finalist	
2015	Kim Seo-yeon	Non-Finalist	
Miss Universe Korea — a franchise to Miss Universe from 2016
2016	Jenny Kim	Non-Finalist	Miss Congeniality
2017	Cho Se-whee	Non-Finalist	
2018	Baek Ji-hyun	Non-Finalist	
2019	Lee Yeon-joo	Non-Finalist	
2020	Park Ha-ri	Non-Finalist	
2021	Kim Ji-su	Non-Finalist	
2022	Kim Hanna	Non-Finalist	
2023	Kim So-yun	Non-Finalist	
2024	Han Ariel	Non-Finalist	
2025	Soo-yeon Lee	Non-Finalist	
2026	Yurim Kim	TBA	

== See also ==
- Miss Universe
- Miss Queen Korea
- Miss Korea
- Miss Grand Korea
- Miss International Korea
- Miss Earth Korea
- Mister World Korea
- Mister International Korea
- Miss and Mister World Korea
- Miss and Mister Supranational Korea

Preceded by Miss Korea (Hankook Ilbo); 1957–2015	Miss Universe franchise holder of Korea	Succeeded by Miss Universe Korea (PJP); 2016–present
