= Miss International Korea =

Beauty contest

Miss International Korea 미스 인터내셔널 코리아
- Formation: 1960; 66 years ago
- Type: Beauty pageant
- Headquarters: Seoul
- Location: South Korea
- Members: Miss International
- Official language: Korean
- President: Choi Yoon-jung
- National director: Ho-seong Kim
- Parent organization: Miss International Korea Organization (2026 –present)

Miss International Korea (Korean: 미스 인터내셔널 코리아) is a national beauty pageant in South Korea.

== History ==
Korea debuted at Miss International in 1960. In 1957 the first Miss Korea competition took place in 1957 and was sponsored by the Korean newspaper Hankook Ilbo. In 1960, Hankook Ilbo sent Miss International contestant who represents Korea.

For the 2025 Miss International pageant, the South Korean representative was selected through a competition organized separately by the Korea Beauty Organization (KBO).

Starting with the 2026, the contest will be hosted by the Miss International Korea Organization and Organized by AP Communications (Anapeech).

== Editions ==
=== Date and venue ===
The following list details of the every Miss International Korea contest since the first one in 2025.

| Year | Edition | Date | Final venue | Host Province | Entrants | Ref. |
|---|---|---|---|---|---|---|
| 2025 (Note: Co-organized with the Miss Grand Korea 2025 pageant.) | 1st | 20 June | Konkuk University, Gwangjin | Seoul | 25 | |
| 2026 | 2nd | 15 July | Fashion Lifestyle Experience Complex, Buk | Daegu | 20 | |

=== Competition results ===
| Year | Miss International Korea | Runners-up | | Special Awards | Ref. |
| Year | Miss International Korea | 1st Runner-up | 2nd Runner-up | Special Awards | Ref. |
|---|---|---|---|---|---|
| 2025 | Ji-hoo Kim | Lee Seohyeon | Not awarded | Joohye Lee, Kang Kyeong-hye | |
| 2026 | Suyeon Jang | Yuju Cho, Kwon Seung-hyun | Nam Gyu-min, Lang Sa, Seoyeon Kim, Kim Do-kyung | Zinnia Kim, Kang Min-jung, Kim Chae-young, Kim Da-young, Park So-eun, Kim Chae-eun, Kim So-yeon, Kim Hyang-yeon, Kwon Min-ji | |

== Miss International ==
Miss International Korea licensee

Color key

- Declared as Winner
- Ended as runner-up
- Ended as top 8 qualification
- Ended as one of the finalists or semi-finalists
- Ended as special awards

| Year | Delegate | National Title | International Placement & Performance | | National director |
| Year | Delegate | National Title | Placements | Special award(s) | National director |
List of Miss International Participant from 1960 to 2024
| Korea Beauty Pageant Organization — a franchise to Miss International from 2025 | | | | | Kim Ho-Seong |
| 2025 | Ji-hoo Kim | Miss International Korea 2025 | Unplaced | —N/a | Kim Ho-Seong |
| Miss International Korea Organization — a franchise to Miss International from 2026 | | | | | Kim Ho-Seong |
| 2026 | Su-yeon Jang | Miss International Korea 2026 | TBA | | Kim Ho-Seong |

== Other international pageants ==
| Year | Representative | Original National Title | International contest | | | President, National director |
| Year | Representative | Original National Title | Pageant | Placement | Special Awards | President, National director |
|---|---|---|---|---|---|---|
| 2025 | Kim Gyuri | Miss Grand Korea 2025: Note: Miss Gyeongbuk 2025 Manners Award & Second Runner-up of Miss Supranational Korea 2025 | Miss Grand International 2025 | Unplaced | —N/a | Kim Ho-Seong, Choo Mi-jung |
| 2025 | Seolha Yang | Finalist of 2025 | The Miss Globe 2025 | Unplaced | —N/a | Kim Ho-Seong, Choo Mi-jung |
| 2025 | Park Hyewon | The Miss Globe Korea 2025: Note: Special Award of Miss Supranational Korea 2025 | The Miss Globe 2025 | Did not compete | | Kim Ho-Seong, Choo Mi-jung |
| 2025 | Hee-won Yang | Finalist of 2025 | Miss Asia Pacific International 2025 | Unplaced | —N/a | Kim Ho-Seong, Choo Mi-jung |
| 2025 | Kim min | Miss Asia Pacific Korea 2025 | Miss Asia Pacific International 2025 | Did not compete | | Kim Ho-Seong, Choo Mi-jung |
| 2025 | Cho Ha-young | Appointed: Miss Intercontinental Korea 2024 Photogenic | Face of Beauty International 2025 | Unplaced | 2 Special Awards: FOBI 2025 Asia; Tainan Anping Aloft Hotel Award | Kim Ho-Seong, Choo Mi-jung |
| 2025 | Jang Seowon | Face of Beauty Korea 2025 | Face of Beauty International 2025 | Did not compete | | Kim Ho-Seong, Choo Mi-jung |
| 2025 | Lee Seohyeon | 1st Runner-up of 2025: Note: First Runner-up of Miss Green Korea 2024 & Miss Tourism Queen International Korea 2025 & Miss Intercontinental Korea 2025 Special Award & Miss Universe Korea 2025 (Ms.) | Miss Top Model of the World 2025 | Winner | 1 Special Awards: Miss Art Lali Production | Kim Ho-Seong, Choo Mi-jung |
| 2025 | Lee Seohyeon | 1st Runner-up of 2025: Note: First Runner-up of Miss Green Korea 2024 & Miss Tourism Queen International Korea 2025 & Miss Intercontinental Korea 2025 Special Award & Miss Universe Korea 2025 (Ms.) | Miss Freedom of the world 2025 | Unplaced | 3 Special Awards: Miss Liqeni i Mjellmave; Miss Best Auto Market; Miss Evening Dress | Kim Ho-Seong, Choo Mi-jung |
| 2025 | Joohye Lee | Miss Freedom Korea 2025: Note: World Miss University Korea 2022 Finalists | Miss Freedom of the world 2025 | Did not compete | | Kim Ho-Seong, Choo Mi-jung |
| 2025 | Jang Jian | Appointed: Miss Intercontinental Korea 2025 Miss Model of the World Award | Miss Model of the World 2025 | Did not compete | | Kim Ho-Seong, Choo Mi-jung |
| 2026 | Yuju Cho | 1st Runner-up of 2026: Note: Global Chunhyang 2026 Friendship Award | Miss Asia Pacific International 2026 | Top 25 | — | Kim Ho-Seong, Choi Yoon-jung |
| 2026 | Ha-jin Ahn | Auditioned: Note: Miss Grand Korea 2026 2nd Runner-up | Face of Beauty International 2026 | Top 15 | 1 Special Awards: Miss Face of Beauty World 2026 | Kim Ho-Seong, Choi Yoon-jung |
| 2026 | Kwon Seung-hyun | 1st Runner-up of 2026: Note: 2023 Miss Intercontinental Seoul Metropolitan Area 2nd Runner-up | Miss Lumiere International World 2026 | TBA | TBA | Kim Ho-Seong, Choi Yoon-jung |
| 2026 | Zinnia Kim | Choice Award of 2026: Note: Smile Queen Korea Contest 美 2026 & Miss Gangwon Finalist 2026 | Miss Heritage International 2026 | TBA | TBA | Kim Ho-Seong, Choi Yoon-jung |
| 2026 | Zinnia Kim | Choice Award of 2026: Note: Smile Queen Korea Contest 美 2026 & Miss Gangwon Finalist 2026 | Miss Heritage Global 2026 | No Pageant Held | | Kim Ho-Seong, Choi Yoon-jung |

== See also ==
- Miss International
- Miss Queen Korea
- Miss Korea
- Mister Korea
- Miss Grand Korea
- Mister World Korea
- Mister International Korea
- Miss Earth Korea
- Miss Universe Korea Representative
- Miss and Mister World Korea
- Miss and Mister Supranational Korea

| Preceded by Miss Korea (Hankook Ilbo); 1960–2024 | Miss International franchise holder of Korea | Succeeded by Miss International Korea; 2025–present |
