= Miss Earth Korea =

Beauty contest

- 미스 어스 코리아
- Formation: 2002; 24 years ago
- Type: Beauty pageant
- Headquarters: Seoul
- Location: South Korea
- Members: Miss Earth
- Official language: Korean
- President: Kim So-young
- Parent organization: Miss Earth Korea Organizing Committee (SY Personal Brand & SY Academy)(2025 –present)
- Website: Miss Earth Korea official website

Miss Earth Korea (Korean: 미스 어스 코리아) is a national beauty pageant in South Korea.

== History ==
Korea debuted at Miss Earth in 2002. In 1957 the first Miss Korea competition took place in 1957 and was sponsored by the Korean newspaper Hankook Ilbo. In 2002, Hankook Ilbo sent Miss Earth contestant who represents Korea.

Until 2024, Miss Korea would also select the representative to Miss Earth, but starting with Miss Earth 2025, Korean representative for Miss Earth will be selected through the Miss Earth Korea pageant.

== Editions ==
=== Date and venue ===
The following list details of the every Miss Earth Korea contest since the first one in 2025.

Year	Edition	Date	Final venue	Host Province	Entrants	Ref.
2025	1st	20 August	Eliena Hotel, Gangnam	Seoul	16	
2026	2nd	25 August	Dongdaemun Design Plaza (DDP), Jung-gu	Seoul	19	

=== Competition results ===
Year	Main Awards									Special Awards	Ref.
Year	1st place	2nd place	3rd place	4th place	5th place	6th place	7th place	8th place	Main Awards	Special Awards	Ref.
2025	Yoon-seo Choi (Earth)	Seungyeon Bae (Air)	Woo Ji-yu (Water)	Jisoo Park (Fire)	Yujin Kim (Beauty)	Choi Go-eun (Top Model)	Not awarded		Chaeyoung Yoon (Entertainer), Eunbin Choi (Celebrity)	Eunji Lee, Jinju Park, Seok Min-ah, Song Joo-seung, Minjeong Kang, Jeongyoon Lee, Heejeong Son, Chaewon Cho	
2026	Park Soo-in (Earth)	Eo Han-na (Air)	Kim Na-young (Water)	Jeong Ha-rim (Fire)	Jung Hye-yoon (Green)	Kim Min-ju (Eco)	Noh Hye-jin (Metacell)	Jeong Seo-yun (Forest)	Jang Yeon-seo (Pentacle)	Son Su-bin, Kim Yeo-won, Park Jeong-min, Park Jeong-eun, Yun Bo-gyeong, Jeong Eun-bin, Kim Seung-hyun, Kim Si-a, Kim Skyler, Jeong I-ji	

== International pageants ==
Miss Earth Korea licensee

=== Miss Earth ===
Color key

- Declared as Winner
- Ended as top 4
- Ended as top 8 qualification
- Ended as one of the finalists or semi-finalists
- Ended as special awards

Year	Delegate	National Title	International Placement & Performance		Notes
Year	Delegate	National Title	Placements	Special award(s)	Notes
List of Miss Earth Participant from 2002 to 2024
Miss Earth Korea — a franchise to Miss Earth from 2025
2025	Yoon-seo Choi	Miss Earth Korea 2025	Top 25	2 Special Awards: (gold) Green Leaders in Action Challenge (Asia & Oceania Group 2); Pilgrim's Nature Ambassador : 2nd r–up – Miss Water 2025 (Fire Group)	Note: Miss Busan Ulsan Gyeongnam 2025
2026	Na-yeong Kim	Miss Earth Korea Water 2026	TBA	TBA	

== See also ==
- Miss Earth
- Miss Queen Korea
- Miss Korea
- Miss Grand Korea
- Mister Korea
- Mister World Korea
- Mister International Korea
- Miss Universe Korea Representative
- Miss and Mister World Korea
- Miss International Korea
- Miss and Mister Supranational Korea

Preceded by Miss Korea (Hankook Ilbo); 2002–2024	Miss Earth franchise holder of Korea	Succeeded by Miss Earth Korea (SY Personal Brand); 2025–present
