= Miss and Mister Supranational Korea =

National male beauty pageant competition in South Korea

Miss and Mister Supranational Korea; 미스앤미스터 수프라내셔널 코리아
- Formation: 2010 / 2018
- Purpose: Beauty pageant
- Headquarters: Seoul
- Location: South Korea
- Official language: Korean
- President: Ricky Junghoon Jun; (World Beauty Queen)
- Affiliations: Miss and Mister Supranational
- Website: www.worldbeautyqueen.org/index2.html

Miss and Mister Supranational Korea is a national beauty pageant responsible for selecting South Korea's representative to the Miss Supranational and Mister Supranational pageant.

== History ==
Miss Korea debuted at Miss Supranational in 2010.

From 2014 to 2021, the Miss Queen Korea organization sent Korean representatives to Miss Supranational. Beginning in 2022, the Miss Queen Korea took over Miss Universe and Miss World only.

In 2022, the Miss Supranational Korea license was transferred to World Beauty Queen (Mister International Korea). This organization sends a Korean representative to Mister Supranational.

== Titleholders ==
Year	Miss Supranational Korea	Runners Up			Ref.
Year	Miss Supranational Korea	First	Second	Third	Ref.
2018	Lee Eun-bi	Elena Lee	Seonyoung Kook, Kwon Whee	Harim Goo, Taeyoung Kim, Lee Yeon-joo	
2019	Kwon Whee	Hyesoo Jeon	Hwang Chae-won	Yoo Su-jeong	
2025^{[α]}	Yu Hyeon-jeong	Woo Hae-su, Kim Seol-ha	Kim Gyu-ri, Ham Se-young, Kim Ah-hyun	Not awarded	

Note:
- ^α Hosted by World Beauty Queen and Organized by SY Personal Brand.

== International pageants ==
Miss Supranational Korea licensee

=== Miss Supranational ===
- : Declared the winner
- : Finished as a runner-up
- : Finished as one of the finalists
- : Finished as one of the semi-finalists
- : Finished with special awards

Korea debuted at Miss Supranational in 2010.

Year	Delegate	International Placement & Performance	
Year	Delegate	Placements	Special award(s)
2009	Did not compete in 2009		
Miss Korea — a franchise to Miss Supranational from 2010
2010	You Soo-jung	Top 20 (10th place)	Asia & Oceania
Did not compete between 2011 and 2013
Miss Queen Korea — a franchise to Miss Supranational from 2014
2014	Kim Min-ji	Non-Finalist	
2015	Did not compete in 2015		
Personally — Miss Supranational from 2016
2016	Dasol Lee	Non-Finalist	
Miss Queen Korea — a franchise to Miss Supranational from 2017
2017	Jenny Kim	Miss Supranational 2017	
2018	Lee Eun-bi	Non-Finalist	Best Talent; Best National Costume
2019	Kwon Whee	Non-Finalist	
2020	Due to the impact of COVID-19 pandemic, no competition held		
2021	Jeon Hye-soo	Non-Finalist	
World Beauty Queen — a franchise to Miss Supranational from 2022
2022	Song Che-ryun	Non-Finalist	Top 28 - Best Talent
2023	Roh Ju-hyeon	Non-Finalist	Best Talent
2024	Choi Jeong-eun	Withdrew	
2025	Yu Hyeon-jeong	Top 24	Top 10 - Supra Fan Vote
2026	Lee Yoon-jeong	Non-Finalist	Confidence Round (Fan Vote)
2027	TBA	TBA	TBA

== International pageants ==
Mister Supranational Korea licensee

=== Mister Supranational ===
- : Declared the winner
- : Finished as a runner-up
- : Finished as one of the finalists
- : Finished as one of the semi-finalists
- : Finished with special awards

Korea debuted at Mister Supranational in 2018.

Year	Delegate	International Placement & Performance	
Year	Delegate	Placements	Special award(s)
2016	Did not compete in 2016		
Mister International Korea — a franchise to Mister Supranational from 2017
2017	Kim Young-geun	Did not compete	
2018	Park Cheong-woo	Non-Finalist	
2019	Woo Chang-wook	Non-Finalist	
2020	Due to the impact of COVID-19 pandemic, no competition held		
2021	Cho Young-dong	Non-Finalist	Mister Friendship; Top 10 – Supra Influencer
2022	Han Jung-wan	Top 20 (11th Place)	Supra Chat; Top 5 – Top Model; Top 10 - Best Talent; Top 12 – Supra Influencer
2023	Lee Yong-woo	3rd Runner-Up	Top Model
2024	Jo Seong-hyeon	Non-Finalist	Top 11 - Top Model; Top 10 - Supra Fan-Vote
2025	Lee Seung-Chan	Non-Finalist	Mister Talent
2026	Kim Tae-woo	Non-Finalist	Top 10 - Supra Chat
2027	Jung Myeong-cheol	TBA	TBA

== See also ==
- Miss Korea
- Miss Queen Korea
- Miss Grand Korea
- Miss Earth Korea
- Miss International Korea
- Mister World Korea
- Mister International Korea
- Miss and Mister World Korea
- Miss Universe Korea Representative

Preceded by Miss Queen Korea; 2014–2021	Miss Supranational franchise holder of Korea	Succeeded by World Beauty Queen; 2022–present
