= Miss and Mister World Korea =

National male beauty pageant competition in South Korea

Miss and Mister World Korea 미스앤미스터 월드 코리아
- Formation: 1959 / 2010
- Type: Beauty pageant
- Headquarters: Seoul
- Location: South Korea
- Members: Miss World, Mister World
- Official language: Korean
- President: Park Jeong-ah
- Website: missworldkorea.com

Miss and Mister World Korea is a national beauty pageant responsible for selecting South Korea's representative to the Miss World and Mister World pageant..

Miss and Mister World Korea 2015 took place on 20 November at the Alpensia Resort in Pyeongchang.

== History ==
In 1957 the first Miss Korea competition took place in 1957 and was sponsored by the Korean newspaper Hankook Ilbo. In 1959, Hankook Ilbo sent first Miss World contestant who represents Korea. Miss Korea competed at the Miss World between 1959 and 2010. In 2011 the new pageant comes Miss World Korea competition.

In 2010, Hankook Ilbo sent first Mister World contestant who is represent Korea. Miss and Mister World Korea Organization sent to Mister World in 2014. The president of Miss and Mister World Korea is Park Jeong-ah.

== Representatives to international beauty pageants ==
Miss World Korea licensee

Color key

- : Declared as Winner
- : Ended as Runner-up
- : Ended as one of the Finalists
- : Ended as one of the Semi-finalists
- : Ended as special awards

=== Miss World ===
Korea debuted at Miss World in 1959.

Year	Delegate	International Placement & Performance	
Year	Delegate	Placements	Special award(s)
Did not compete between 1951 and 1958
Miss Korea — a franchise to Miss World from 1959
1959	Seo Jung-ae	Non-Finalist	
1960	Lee Young-hee	Top 10	
1961	Hyun Chang-ae	Non-Finalist	
1962	Chung Tae-ja	Non-Finalist	
1963	Choi Keum-shil	Top 14	
1964	Yoon Mi-hee	Non-Finalist	
1965	Lee Eun-ah	Top 16	
1966	Chung Eul-sun	Non-Finalist	
1967	Chung Young-hwa	Non-Finalist	
1968	Lee Ji-eun	Non-Finalist	
1969	Kim Seung-hee	Non-Finalist	
1970	Lee Jung-hee	Non-Finalist	
1971	Lee Young-eun	Non-Finalist	
1972	Chung Keum-ok	Did not compete	
1973	An Soon-young	Non-Finalist	
1974	Shim Kyoung-sook	Non-Finalist	
1975	Lee Sung-hee	Non-Finalist	
1976	Shin Byoung-sook	Non-Finalist	
1977	Kim Soon-ae	Non-Finalist	
1978	Je Eun-jin	Non-Finalist	
1979	Hong Yeo-jin	Non-Finalist	
1980	Chang Sun-ja	Non-Finalist	
1981	Lee Han-na	Non-Finalist	
1982	Choi Sung-yoon	Non-Finalist	
1983	Seo Min-sook	Non-Finalist	
1984	Lee Joo-hee	Non-Finalist	
1985	Park Eun-kyoung	Non-Finalist	
1986	An Jung-mi	Non-Finalist	
1987	Chung Myoung-sun	Non-Finalist	
1988	Choi Yeon-hee	1st Runner-up	Beauty Queen of Asia
1989	Kim Hye-ri	Non-Finalist	
1990	Go Hyun-jung	Non-Finalist	
1991	Kim Tae-hwa	Non-Finalist	
1992	Lee Mi-young	Non-Finalist	
1993	Lee Seung-yeon	Top 10	
1994	Chae Yeon-hee	Non-Finalist	
1995	Choi Yoon-young	Top 5 (5th place)	Beauty Queen of Asia & Oceania
1996	Seol Soo-jin	Non-Finalist	
1997	Kim Jin-ah	Non-Finalist	
1998	Kim Kun-woo	Non-Finalist	
1999	Han Na-na	Non-Finalist	
2000	Shin Jung-sun	Non-Finalist	
2001	Seo Hyun-jin	Non-Finalist	Best Dress Design Award
2002	Chang Yoo-kyoung	Withdrew	
2003	Park Ji-yea	Non-Finalist	Talent Show Top 21
2004	Han Kyoung-jin	Non-Finalist	Talent Show Top 25
2005	Oh Eun-young	Top 6 (4th place)	Beauty Queen of Asia Pacific; Beauty With A Purpose; Talent Show Top 16 (Best Original Performance Second Place)
2006	Park Sharon	Non-Finalist	Miss World Sports Top 24
2007	Cho Eun-ju	Non-Finalist	Best Dress Design Award; Beach Beauty Top 21
2008	Choi Bo-in	Non-Finalist	
2009	Kim Joo-ri	Top 16	Beauty Queen of Asia & Oceania; Runner Up 1 - Talent Show; Best Dress Design Award Top 12; Beach Beauty Top 20
2010	Kim Hye-young	Non-Finalist	Talent Show Top 10
Miss World Korea — a franchise to Miss World from 2011
2011	Do Kyung-min	Top 7 (5th place)	Miss World Top Model (Top 10); Miss World Beach Beauty (Top 20)
2012	Kim Sung-min	Non-Finalist	
2013	Park Min-ji	Non-Finalist	
2014	Song Hwa-young	Non-Finalist	
2015	Chyung Eun-ju	Non-Finalist	
2016	Wang Hyun	Top 11	
2017	Kim Ha-eun	Top 10	Beauty Queen of Asia; Miss World Top Model (Top 30)
2018	Cho Ah	Non-Finalist	Miss World Top Model (3rd Runner-up)
2019	Lim Ji-yeon	Non-Finalist	
2020	Due to the impact of COVID-19 pandemic, no competition held		
2021	Tara Hong	Non-Finalist	Best Dress Design Award; Miss World Talent (Top 27); Miss World Sport (Top 32)
2022	Due to the impact of COVID-19 pandemic, no competition held		
2023	Kim Li-jin	Non-Finalist	Miss World Sport (Top 32)
2024	No competition held		
2025	Min Jung	Did not compete (Injury)	
2026	Cha Minseo	Non-Finalist	Top 20 - Head to Head Challenge (Top 5 of Asia & Oceania)
2027	TBA	TBA	TBA

== Representatives to international beauty pageants ==
Mister World Korea licensee

Color key

- : Declared as Winner
- : Ended as Runner-up
- : Ended as one of the Finalists
- : Ended as one of the Semi-finalists
- : Ended as special awards

=== Mister World ===
Korea debuted at Mister World in 2010.

Year	Delegate	International Placement & Performance	
Year	Delegate	Placements	Special award(s)
Did not compete between 1996 and 2007
Hankook Ilbo — a franchise to Mister World from 2010
2010	Yoo Ji-kwang	Top 15 (7th Place)	Mister World Talent; Top 20 – Mister World Top Model
2012	Did not compete in 2012		
Mister World Korea — a franchise to Mister World from 2014
2014	Lim Jae-yeon	Non-Finalist	
2016	Seo Young-suk	Non-Finalist	
2019	Na Gi-wook	Non-Finalist	
Due to the impact of COVID-19 pandemic, no competition held
2024	Did not compete in 2024		

== See also ==
- Miss World
- Mister World
- Miss Queen Korea
- Mister World Korea
- Miss Korea
- Miss Earth Korea
- Miss Grand Korea
- Miss International Korea
- Mister International Korea
- Miss Universe Korea Representative
- Miss and Mister Supranational Korea

Preceded by Miss Korea (Hankook Ilbo); 1959–2010	Miss World franchise holder of Korea	Succeeded by Miss Queen Korea (PJP); 2011–present

Preceded by Mister World Korea (Hankook Ilbo); 2010	Mister World franchise holder of Korea	Succeeded by Mister World Korea (PJP); 2014–present
