= Kim Yu-mi (beauty pageant titleholder) =

South Korean actress, model and beauty queen (born 1990)

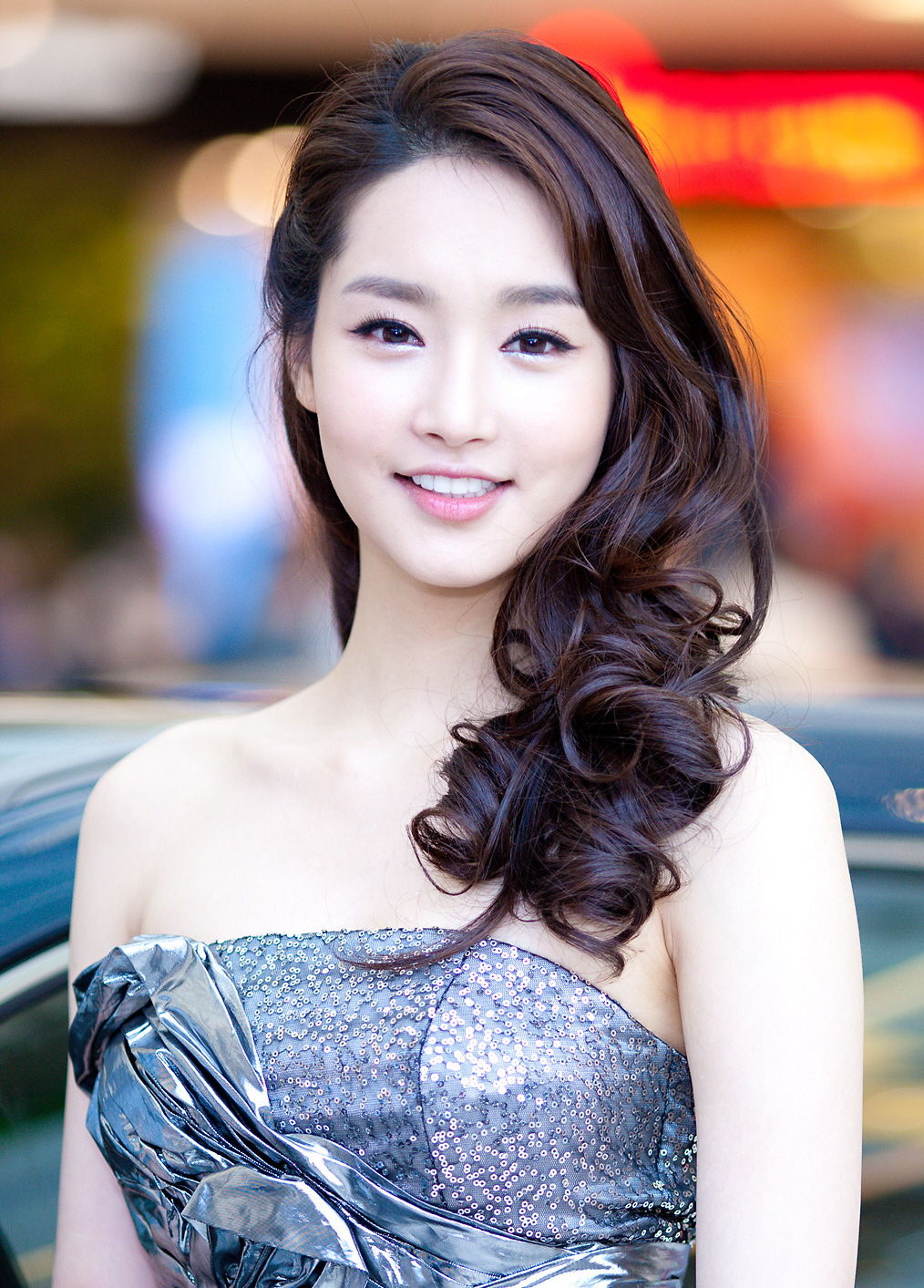
- Kim in 2012
- Born: April 26, 1990 (age 36); Seoul, South Korea
- Other name: Yumi Kim
- Education: Konkuk University
- Occupations: Actress; model; beauty pageant titleholder
- Height: 1.75 m (5 ft 9 in)
- Beauty pageant titleholder
- Title: Miss Korea 2012
- Agency: INN Company
- Years active: 2012–2021
- Hair color: Black
- Eye color: Black
- Major competitions: Miss Korea 2012 (winner); Miss Universe 2013 (unplaced)

Kim Yu-mi (Korean: 김유미, born April 26, 1990), also known as Yumi Kim, is a South Korean actress and beauty pageant titleholder who was crowned Miss Korea 2012, Miss Universe Korea 2013 and represented her country in the Miss Universe 2013 pageant. Kim began her career as an actress when she made her acting debut in the television series Naeil's Cantabile (2014).

== Education ==
Kim Yu-mi is a film major at Konkuk University in South Korea.

== Pageantry ==
=== Miss Korea 2012 ===
Kim Yu-mi was crowned Miss Korea 2012 in an event held at Kyung Hee University Grand Peace Palace in Seoul on July 6, 2012, beating out 53 other contestants. Since first time, HanKook Daily News, also known as Miss Korea Organization, announced the Miss Korea winner's title name as "Miss Universe Korea" during Miss Korea 2012 pageant.

=== Miss Universe 2013 ===
Kim Yu-mi participated in the Miss Universe 2013 representing Korea. She did not place in the semifinals.

== Acting career ==
On October 13, 2014, it was announced that Kim would make her debut as a television actress, playing Chae Do-kyung in the KBS2 Naeil's Cantabile. Kim then appeared in the music videos for Toy's "Three People" and 2PM's "My House".

On October 15, 2015, Kim starred in the web series Delicious Love, co-starring alongside B1A4's Gongchan. On November 10, she was cast in the MBC family-oriented television miniseries The Dearest Lady.

On June 22, 2016, Kim made her film debut in the Chinese film Bounty Hunters. On September 9, Kim appeared in the web series Bong Soon: A Cyborg in Love, playing the role as Super Junior's Kyuhyun ex-girlfriend. In 2017, Kim was cast as Lee Hyo-ri in Radiant Office.

On March 4, 2020, it was announced that Kim had signed with INN Company. On September 25, Kim was a cast in the variety show Beauty and Luxury Season 5. On October 26, Kim starred in the drama film A Song for My Dear, making return to acting after 4 years. The film was released on March 8, 2023.

== Cosmetic surgery controversy ==
Shortly after winning the 2012 Miss Korea pageant, younger photos of Ms. Kim appeared online showing a dramatic difference in her appearance before and after cosmetic surgery, causing a stir in the Korean media about the prevalence of cosmetic surgery. To which she responded in an interview "I was shocked that the papers made it out like I claimed to have been a natural beauty, I never once said that I was born beautiful."

== Filmography ==
=== Film ===
Year	Title	Role	Notes	Ref.
2016	Bounty Hunters	Mei	Chinese film	
2023	A Song for My Dear	Soo Kyung		

=== Television series ===
Year	Title	Role	Notes	Ref.
2014	Naeil's Cantabile	Chae Do-kyung		
2015	Persevere, Goo Hae-ra	Judy Kim	Cameo	
2015	Delicious Love	Kang Yu-na		
2015–2016	The Dearest Lady	Kang Se-ran		
2016	Bong Soon: A Cyborg in Love	Choi Seo-hee		
2017	Radiant Office	Lee Hyo-ri		

=== Television shows ===
Year	Title	Role	Ref.
2020–2021	Beauty and Luxury Season 5	Cast member	

=== Music video appearances ===
Year	Song Title	Artist	Ref.
2014	"Three People"	Toy feat. Sung Si-kyung	
2015	"My House"	2PM	

Awards and achievements
Preceded by Lee Seong-hye	Miss Korea; 2012	Succeeded by Yoo Ye-bin
