= Dasol Lee =

Beauty pageant titleholder

- Born: Lee Da Sol; January 4, 1990 (age 36); Cheongju, South Korea
- Occupation: Actor
- Height: 1.72 m (5 ft 7 1/2 in)
- Beauty pageant titleholder
- Title: Miss Grand Korea 2015
- Hair color: Black
- Eye color: Brown
- Major competitions: Miss Universe Canada 2014; Miss Grand International Korea 2015 (Winner)

Dasol Lee (born January 4, 1990) is a Korean-Canadian beauty pageant titleholder who was crowned Miss Grand Korea 2015. She represented Korea in the Miss Grand International 2015 pageant held in Bangkok, Thailand.

== Personal life ==
Lee was born in Cheongju, South Korea and grew up in Seoul. Her family moved to Canada when she was nine years old. She grew up in Hamilton, Ontario. She studied Bachelor of Science in Chemistry at Queen's University and Bachelor of Education at University of Toronto. She has played piano and violin for over 20 years. She speaks Korean, English, and French.

== Pageantry ==
=== Miss Grand International 2015 ===
Dasol Lee represented her country, Korea in Miss Grand International pageant held in Bangkok, Thailand.

=== Miss Universe Canada 2014 ===
Dasol Lee competed in Miss Universe Canada 2014, held in Toronto, Ontario, Canada.

Awards and achievements
Preceded by Jung Hye-won	Miss Grand International Korea; 2015	Succeeded by TBA
