= Yoo Ye-bin =

South Korean beauty pageant titleholder (born 1992)

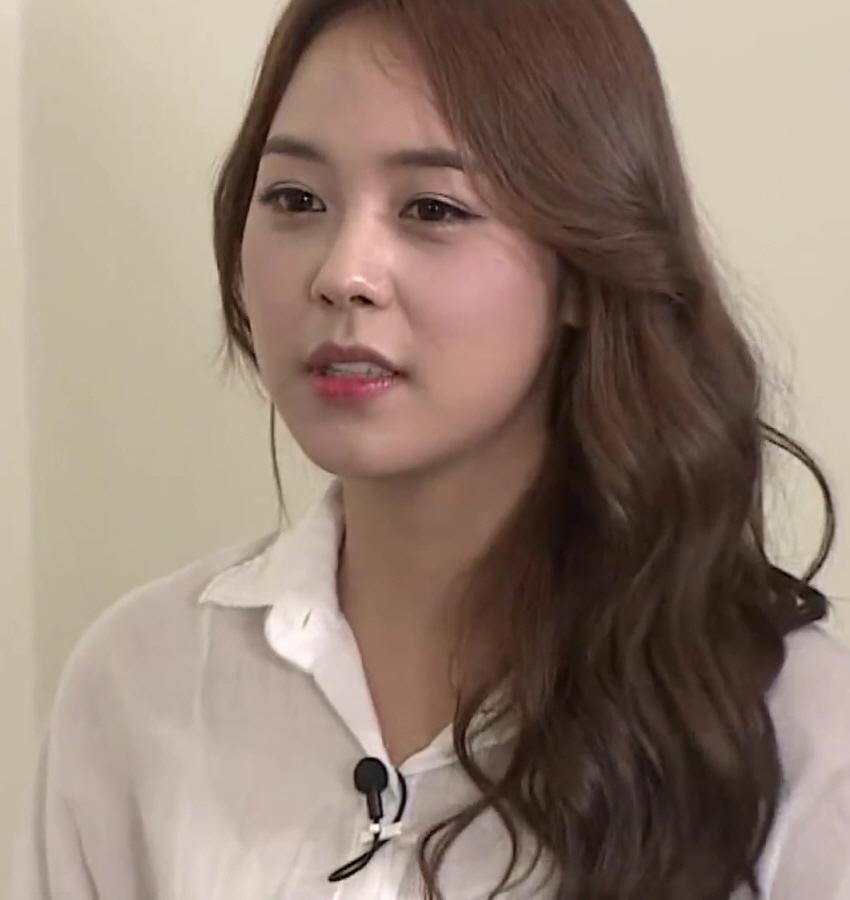
- Yoo in 2015
- Born: Yoo Ye-bin; January 30, 1992 (age 34); Daegu, South Korea
- Height: 1.71 m (5 ft 7 1/2 in)
- Beauty pageant titleholder
- Title: Miss Daegu 2013; Miss Korea 2013
- Agency: People Story Company
- Hair color: Brown; Black (dyed)
- Eye color: Black
- Major competitions: Miss Universe 2014 (unplaced)

Yoo Ye-bin (born January 30, 1992) is a South Korean actress and beauty pageant titleholder who was crowned Miss Korea 2013 and represented her country at the Miss Universe 2014 pageant.

== Early life ==
Yoo Ye-bin was born in Daegu, South Korea and currently is an undergraduate student majoring in textiles at Gyeongsang National University.

== Pageantry ==
=== Miss Korea 2013 ===
Yoo was crowned Miss Korea 2013 or ″Miss Universe Korea 2014″ during the Miss Korea 2013 competition held June 4.

=== Miss Universe 2014 ===
Yoo represented Korea at Miss Universe 2014, but was Unplaced.

== Acting career ==
In September 2018, Yoo signed an exclusive management deal with People Story Company.

=== Filmography ===
- Player (OCN, 2018) as Cho Yeon-hee

Awards and achievements
Preceded by Kim Yu-mi	Miss Korea; 2013	Succeeded by Kim Seo-yeon
