= Kim Joo-hee =

South Korean TV host and beauty pageant titleholder

Kim Joo-hee 김주희
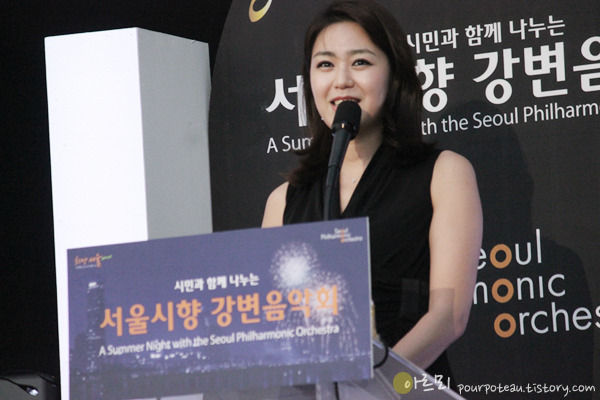
- Born: June 30, 1981 (age 45); Seoul, South Korea
- Height: 1.69 m (5 ft 6 1/2 in)
- Beauty pageant titleholder
- Title: Miss Korea 2005
- Hair color: Black
- Eye color: Brown
- Major competitions: Miss Universe 2006 (unplaced)

Kim Joo-hee (Korean: 김주희, born June 30, 1981) is a South Korean tv host and beauty pageant titleholder who was crowned Miss Korea 2005. She is former Seoul Broadcasting System announcer and represented her country at the Miss Universe 2006 pageant.

== Miss Korea 2005 ==
Kim Joo-hee has been crowned Miss Korea 2005 in an event held at the Grand Hilton Hotel in Seoul on 30 June 2005 beating out 53 other contestants.

== Miss Universe 2006 ==
Kim Joo-hee represented South Korea at the Miss Universe 2006 pageant held on 23 July 2006 in Los Angeles, California, United States.

== See also ==
- Miss Korea
- Seoul Broadcasting System

Awards and achievements
Preceded by Kim So-young	Miss Korea; 2006	Succeeded by Lee Ha-nui
