= Mister World Korea =

National male beauty pageant competition in South Korea

Mister World Korea 미스터 월드 코리아
- Formation: 2009; 17 years ago
- Type: Beauty pageant
- Headquarters: Seoul
- Location: South Korea
- Members: Mister World
- Official language: Korean
- President: Park Jeong-ah
- Website: missworldkorea.com

Mister World Korea (Korean: 미스터 월드 코리아) is a national male beauty pageant responsible for selecting South Korea's representative to the Mister World pageant.

Miss and Mister World Korea 2015 took place on 20 November at the Alpensia Resort in Pyeongchang. The current titleholder is Im Seung-jun, Mister World Korea 2015.

== History ==
In 2009, Hankook Ilbo sent first Mister World contestant who is represent Korea. The president of Miss and Mister World Korea is Park Jeong-ah.

== Titleholders ==
Year	Mister World Korea	Runners Up			Special Awards	Location	Ref.
Year	Mister World Korea	First	Second	Third	Special Awards	Location	Ref.
2015	Im Seung-jun	Koo Seung-hwan	Jung Koo-young	Lee Min-gu	Kim Hee-hwan, Yoo Tae-gye	Pyeongchang	
2014	Seo Young-suk	Kim Seong-eon	Im Hyun-woo, Kim Dae-young	Lee Hwang-hyun, Lee Ji-han, Park Geun-jong	Lee Young-jun, Kim Jae-hyeop	Yeongwol	
2009	Yoo Ji-kwang	Park Hyun-woo	Choi Jae-woong	Not awarded	Kim Hyun-jong, Shim Gyu-gong	Incheon	

== Representatives to international beauty pageants ==
Color keys

- : Declared as Winner
- : Ended as runner-up
- : Ended as top 5/6 qualification
- : Ended as one of the finalists or semifinalists
- : Ended as special awards winner

=== Mister World ===
The winner of Mister World Korea represents his country at Mister World. Miss and Mister World Korea Organization sent to Mister World in 2014.

Year	Delegate	Korean Name	Residence	Placement	Special Awards
2024	Did not compete				
Due to the impact of COVID-19 pandemic, no competition held
2019	Na Gi-wook	나기욱	Incheon	Unplaced	
2016	Seo Young-suk	서영석	Seoul	Unplaced	
2014	Lim Jae-yeon	임재연	Seoul	Unplaced	
2012	Did not compete				
2010	Yoo Ji-kwang	유지광	Seoul	Top 15	Talent & Creativity; Top 20 - Top Model

== See also ==
- Mister World
- Miss Korea
- Miss Queen Korea
- Miss Grand Korea
- Mister International Korea
