= List of Miss Supranational countries =

List of participating countries and territories in the Miss Supranational competition

This is a list of countries that have participated in the Miss Supranational pageant (until 2025 edition).

== Entrants 2009–present ==
Country / Territory	Debut	Participations	Years competed	National title	Placements	Best placement	First placement	Current placement	Notes
Albania	2009	15	2009-2021; 2024-present	Miss Shqipëria	2	Top 20: Anisa Mukaj (2010)	2010: Anisa Mukaj (Top 20)	2017: Alessia Çoku (Top 25)	Won Miss Talent 2009; Top Model 2017.
Angola	2014	4	2014; 2016-2017; 2025	Miss Angola	0	-	-	-	-
Argentina	2013	8	2013-2014; 2016; 2018-2019; 2022; 2024-2025	Miss Argentina	3	Top 20: Marisol Arrillaga (2014)	2014: Marisol Arrillaga (Top 20)	2019: Avril Marco (Top 25)	Won Best Body 2013; Top Model 2016.
Armenia	2010	1	2010	Miss Armenia	0	-	-	-	-
Aruba	2015	2	2015; 2024	Miss Aruba	1	Top 25: Rashida Schmidt (2024)	2024: Rashida Schmidt (Top 25)	2024: Rashida Schmidt (Top 25)	-
Australia	2013	10	2013-2019; 2024-present	Miss Australia	6	Top 10: Esma Voloder (2013); Christiana Fischer (2015)	2013: Esma Voloder (Top 10)	2018: Maddison Clare (Top 25)	Won Miss Supranational Asia and Oceania 2012; Miss Supranational Oceania 2018; Top Model Oceania 2018.
Azerbaijan	2009	2	2009; 2013	Miss Azerbaijan	0	-	-	-	-
Bahrain	2026	1	2026	Miss Supranational Bahrain	0	-	-	-	-
Bangladesh	2024	1	2024	Miss Bangladesh	0	-	-	-	-
Barbados	2019	1	2019	Miss Universe Barbados	0	-	-	-	-
Belarus	2009	11	2009-2019	Miss Belarus	6	Winner: Katsiaryna Buraya (2012)	2009: Marina Lepesha (1st Runner-up)	2018: Margarita Martynova (Top 25)	Won Miss Supranational Europe 2013; Top Model Europe 2018.
Belgium	2010	16	2010-present	Miss Belgium	3	Top 12: Louise-Marie Losfeld (2021)	2010: Chloe De Groote (Top 20)	2021: Louise-Marie Losfeld (Top 12)	Won Miss Internet 2010; Miss Elegance 2018; Miss Photogenic 2021; Top Model Europe 2021.
Belize	2012	1	2012	Miss Belize	0	-	-	-	-
Bolivia	2010	16	2010-present	Miss Bolivia	4	Top 12: Vanessa Hayes (2025)	2017: Romina Rocamonje (Top 25)	2025: Vanessa Hayes (Top 12)	-
Bonaire	2011	2	2011 2026-present	Miss Bonaire	0	-	-	-	-
Bosnia and Herzegovina	2012	1	2012	Miss Bosne i Hercegovine	1	Top 20: Emma Golijanin (2012)	2012: Emma Golijanin (Top 20)	2012: Emma Golijanin (Top 20)	-
Botswana	2023	2	2023-2024	Miss Botswana	1	Top 24: Dabilo Moses (2023)	2023: Dabilo Moses (Top 24)	2023: Dabilo Moses (Top 24)	-
Brazil	2009	17	2009-present	Miss Brazil World	13	Winner: Eduarda Braum (2025)	2009: Karine Osorio Pires (Top 15)	2026: Lara Marina (2nd runner-up)	Won Miss Supranational Americas 2009, 2013, 2018, 2021; Best National Costume 2011; Top Model 2018 & Top Model Americas 2018, 2026; Supra Influencer 2023.
British Virgin Islands	2026	1	2026-present	Miss Universe British Virgin Islands	0	-	-	-	-
Bulgaria	2009	3	2009-2011	Miss Bulgaria	0	-	-	-	-
Cambodia	2022	4	2022-2023; 2025-present	Miss Cambodia	1	Top 24: Sarytola Hok (2026)	2026: Sarytola Hok (Top 24)	2026: Sarytola Hok (Top 24)	Won Supra Influencer 2026
Cameroon	2010	4	2010; 2013; 2019; 2023	Miss Cameroon	1	Top 25: Angèle Kossinda (2019)	2019: Angèle Kossinda (Top 25)	2019: Angèle Kossinda (Top 25)	Won Miss Supranational Africa 2019.
Canada	2010	16	2010-present	Miss World Canada	4	1st runner-up: Siera Bearchell (2015)	2012: Katie Starke (Top 20)	2015: Siera Bearchell (1st runner-up)	Won Miss Congeniality 2010, 2022; Miss Top Model 2012; Miss Friendship 2014; Global Beauties´Woman of Substance 2015.
Cape Verde	2014	2	2014, 2017	Miss Cape Verde	0	-	-	-	-
Cayman Islands	2023	3	2023-2025	Miss Cayman Islands	0	-	-	-	
Chile	2014	8	2014-2017; 2019-2022; 2024	Miss Universo Chile	1	Top 20: Charlotte Molina (2014)	2014: Charlotte Molina (Top 20)	2014: Charlotte Molina (Top 20)	-
China	2009	11	2009-2010, 2013-2018, 2021-2022, 2026 - present	Miss China World	0	-	-	-	Won Top Model 2014; Top Model Asia 2021.
Colombia	2010	14	2010-2011, 2013-2025	Miss Colombia	10	1st runner-up: Tica Martinez (2017)	2010: Marcela Marín (Top 20)	2025: Daniela Roldán (Top 24)	Won Miss Supranational Americas 2022.
Costa Rica	2012	13	2012-2019; 2022-present	Reinas de Costa Rica	3	Top 10: Nicole Menayo (2017)	2012: Karina Ramos (Top 20)	2025: Fabiola Vindas (Top 12)	Won Miss Supranational Americas 2017.
Côte d'Ivoire	2013	6	2013, 2019, 2022-2024, 2026-present	Miss Côte d'Ivoire	0	-	-	-	-
Croatia	2009	10	2009-2011, 2015-2019, 2023-2024	Miss Croatia	1	Top 15: Andreja Cavlović (2009)	2009: Andreja Cavlović (Top 15)	2009: Andreja Cavlović (Top 15)	-
Cuba	2012	6	2012, 2022-present	Miss Cuba	0	-	-	-	Won Best National Costume 2012.
Curaçao	2011	7	2011, 2015, 2022-present	Miss Curaçao	3	2nd runner-up: Quishantely Leito (2025)	2023: Andreina Pereira (Top 24)	2025: Quishantely Leito (2nd runner-up)	Won Contestants' Choice 2023; Miss Supranational Caribbean 2023; Supra Chat Winner 2024.
Cyprus	2009	1	2009	Miss Cyprus	0	-	-	-	-
Czech Republic	2009	17	2009-present	Miss Czech Republic	10	1st runner-up: Hana Verná (2010)	2010: Hana Verná (1st runner-up)	2026: Karolína Gorylová (4th runner-up)	Won Miss Photogenic 2012, 2015; Miss Supranational Europe 2014, 2019; Top Model 2022.
DR Congo	2025	1	2025	Miss Supranational Congo	0	-	-	-	-
Denmark	2009	13	2009-2016; 2018; 2022; 2024-present	Miss Denmark	3	Top 12: Victoria Larsen (2024)	2012: Julia Prokopenko (Top 20)	2024: Victoria Larsen (Top 12)	Won Miss Elegance 2009; Miss Supranational Europe 2012; Miss Photogenic 2014; Supra Fan Vote Winner 2024.
Dominican Republic	2009	16	2009-2015, 2017-present	Miss Dominican Republic	7	4th runner-up: Eoanna Constanza (2021)	2011: Sofinel Báez (Top 10)	2026: Nicole Hernández (Top 24)	Won Miss Supranational Americas 2011; Miss Supranational Caribbean 2019, 2025: Won Top Model Caribbean 2026; Miss Elegance 2011
Ecuador	2010	13	2010-present	Concurso Nacional de Belleza Ecuador	5	Winner: Andrea Aguilera (2023)	2012: Sulay Castillo (4th runner-up)	2026: Kika Marques (Top 24)	Won Best Body 2012; Miss Photogenic 2017
Egypt	2011	3	2011, 2015-2016	Miss Egypt	0	-	-	-	-
El Salvador	2011	10	2011, 2013-2018, 2021-present	Reinado de El Salvador	2	Top 24: Linda Sibrián (2021); Luciana Martínez (2023)	2021: Linda Sibrián (Top 24)	2023: Luciana Martínez (Top 24)	Won Miss Photogenic 2023.
England	2009	13	2009-2016, 2018-2022	Miss England	2	4th runner-up: Amanda Lillian Ball (2009)	2009: Amanda Lillian Ball (4th runner-up)	2012: Rachael Howard (Top 20)	Won Best Body 2009; Miss Elegance 2014.
Equatorial Guinea	2011	6	2011, 2013-2015, 2018-2019	Miss Equatorial Guinea	1	Top 25: Maria Lucrecia Nve Maleva (2018)	2018: Maria Lucrecia Nve Maleva (Top 25)	2018: Maria Lucrecia Nve Maleva (Top 25)	Won Miss Supranational Africa 2014; Miss Personality 2015.
Estonia	2010	7	2010-2015; 2025	Miss Estonia	0	-	-	-	Won Miss Moto Show 2015.
Ethiopia	2011	4	2011, 2016-2017, 2019	Miss Ethiopia	1	3rd runner-up: Bitaniya Josef (2017)	2017: Bitaniya Josef (3rd runner-up)	2017: Bitaniya Josef (3rd runner-up)	-
Finland	2010	11	2010-2011, 2013-2014, 2017-present	Miss Finland	2	Top 12: Aleksandra Hannusaari (2024)	2010: Johanna Ahlback (Top 20)	2024: Aleksandra Hannusaari (Top 12)	Won Best Body 2010; Miss Photogenic 2019.
France	2009	13	2009-2022; 2026 - present	Miss France	4	1st runner-up: Eve Gilles (2026)	2011: Analisa Kebaili (Top 10)	2026: Eve Gilles (1st runner-up)	Won Miss Supranational Europe 2011.
French Polynesia	2011	1	2011	Miss Tahiti	1	Top 20: Mihilani Teixeira (2011)	2011: Mihilani Teixeira (Top 20)	2011: Mihilani Teixeira (Top 20)	Won Miss Personality 2011.
Gabon	2012	4	2012-2015	Miss Gabon	2	2nd runner-up: Maggaly Nguema (2014)	2013: Hilary Ondo (Top 20)	2014: Maggaly Nguema (2nd runner-up)	Won Miss Supranational Africa 2013.
Gambia	2010	1	2010	Miss Gambia	1	Top 20: Fatou Khan (2010)	2010: Fatou Khan (Top 20)	2010: Fatou Khan (Top 20)	Won Miss Supranational Africa 2010.
Georgia	2010	5	2010-2013, 2015	Miss Georgia	0	-	-	-	-
Germany	2009	13	2009-2010; 2012-2013; 2015-2017; 2019-present	Miss Universe Germany	2	1st runner-up: Anna Lakrini (2025)	2024: Luisa Victoria Malz (Top 25)	2025: Anna Lakrini (1st runner-up)	-
Ghana	2013	6	2013, 2015, 2021-2024	Miss Ghana	1	Top 24: Gifty Boakye (2022)	2022: Gifty Boakye (Top 24)	2022: Gifty Boakye (Top 24)	Won Miss Talent 2021; Supra Influencer 2022.
Gibraltar	2014	6	2014-2017, 2023-2024; 2026 - present	Miss Gibraltar	1	Top 12: Michelle Lopez Desoisa (2023)	2023: Michelle Lopez Desoisa (Top 12)	2023: Michelle Lopez Desoisa (Top 12)	Won Miss Supranational Europe 2023.
Greece	2009	8	2009-2011; 2014; 2018; 2021-2023	Star GS Hellas	2	Top 15: Dimitra Alexandraki (2009)	2009: Dimitra Alexandraki (Top 15)	2010: Margarita Papandreou (Top 20)	-
Guadeloupe	2013	7	2013-2018, 2021; 2026 - present	Miss Guadeloupe	0	-	-	-	-
Guatemala	2009	8	2009-2010, 2018-2019, 2022-present	Miss Guatemala	3	Top 24: María Fernanda Milián (2022); Tokyo Cristina Gonzalo (2025)	2019: Andrea Radford (Top 25)	2025: Tokyo Cristina Gonzalo (Top 24)	Won Best National Costume 2018. Miss Influencer 2025
Guinea	2010	1	2010	Miss Supranational Guinea	0	-	-	-	-
Guyana	2016	2	2016, 2021	Miss Guyana	0	-	-	-	-
Haiti	2010	7	2010, 2013, 2016, 2018-2025	Miss Haiti	1	Top 24: Pascale Bélony (2021)	2021: Pascale Bélony (Top 24)	2021: Pascale Bélony (Top 24)	Won Miss Supranational Caribbean 2021; Best National Costume 2018; Top Model Caribbean 2018.
Honduras	2009	7	2009-2013, 2019, 2024	Miss Honduras	4	3rd runner-up: Ruth Alemán (2009)	2009: Ruth Alemán (3rd runner-up)	2024: Stephie Morel (Top 25)	-
Hong Kong	2011	4	2011, 2013, 2015, 2022-present	Miss Hong Kong	1	Top 24: Kumiko Lau (2022)	2022: Kumiko Lau (Top 24)	2022: Kumiko Lau (Top 24)	Won Miss Congeniality 2011.
Hungary	2010	9	2010-2016, 2018-2019	Magyarország Szépe	2	4th runner-up: Korinna Kocsis (2016)	2011: Ágnes Konkoly (Top 20)	2016: Korinna Kocsis (4th runner-up)	Won Miss Supranational Europe 2016.
Iceland	2010	13	2010-2015, 2019-present	Miss Iceland	7	3rd runner-up: Tanja Ýr Ástþórsdóttir (2015)	2011: Guðrún Dögg Rúnarsdóttir (Top 20)	2026: Hrafnhildur Haraldsdóttir (Top 24)	Won Miss Bikini 2013; Miss Supranational Europe 2025
India	2011	15	2011-present	Miss Diva	14	Winner: Asha Bhat (2014); Srinidhi Shetty (2016)	2011: Michelle Almeida (Top 20)	2026: Avni Gupta (Top 12)	Won Miss Supranational Asia and Oceania 2011, 2015, 2016; Miss Supranational Asia 2022, 2023; Miss Internet 2011; Miss Talent 2014; Miss Photogenic 2022; Supra Chat 2025
Indonesia	2013	13	2013-present	Puteri Indonesia	11	Winner: Harashta Haifa Zahra (2024)	2013: Cok Istri Krisnanda Widani (3rd runner-up)	2026: Agnes Rahajeng (Top 12)	Won Miss Supranational Asia 2021, 2025; Best National Costume 2014, 2015, 2018, 2021; Miss Elegance 2016; Best in Swimsuit 2017; Top Model Asia 2018; Woman of Substance 2019; Supra Fan-Vote 2016 (via Mobstar app), 2017 (via Vodi app), 2019, 2021; Supra Chat 2022; Miss Talent 2024.
Iraq	2010	2	2010, 2013	Miss Iraq	0	-	-	-	-
Ireland	2010	6	2010, 2014-2015, 2019-2022	Miss Ireland	1	Top 25: Jessica VanGaalen (2019)	2019: Jessica VanGaalen (Top 25)	2019: Jessica VanGaalen (Top 25)	-
Israel	2011	3	2011-2012, 2015	Miss Israel	0				-
Italy	2010	7	2010; 2013-2015; 2017-2018; 2024	Miss World Italy	1	Top 25: Barbara Storoni (2017)	2017: Barbara Storoni (Top 25)	2017: Barbara Storoni (Top 25)	-
Jamaica	2013	11	2013; 2015-2023; 2025-present	Miss Jamaica World	4	Top 20: Regina Harding (2015)	2015: Regina Harding (Top 20)	2026: Rasheda Green (Top 24)	Won Miss Supranational Caribbean 2022.
Japan	2010	13	2010, 2014-present	Miss Japan	7	Top 20: Mieko Takeuchi (2015)	2015: Mieko Takeuchi (Top 20)	2026: Sadia Nagatori (Top 24)	-
Kazakhstan	2009	3	2009, 2017, 2022	Miss Kazakhstan	1	Top 15: Alina Sheptunova (2009)	2009: Alina Sheptunova (Top 15)	2009: Alina Sheptunova (Top 15)	-
Kenya	2014	8	2014-2015; 2017-2023	Miss World Kenya	3	Top 12: Roleen Mose (2022)	2015: Margaret Muchemi (Top 20)	2022: Roleen Mose (Top 12)	Won Miss Supranational Africa 2021; Supra Influencer 2021; Supra Fan-Vote 2022.
Korea	2010	10	2010; 2014; 2016-2023; 2025-present	Miss Queen Korea	3	Winner: Jenny Kim (2017)	2010: Yu Soo-jung (Top 10)	2025: Hyeon-jeong Yu (Top 24)	Won Miss Supranational Asia and Oceania 2010; Miss Talent 2018, 2023; Best National Costume 2018.
Kosovo	2009	6	2009-2013, 2016	Miss Universe Kosovo	0	-	-	-	-
Kyrgyzstan	2022	2	2022; 2025	Miss Kyrgyzstan	0	-	-	-	-
Laos	2018	4	2018-2019, 2022; 2024	Miss Universe Laos	0	-	-	-	Won Best National Costume 2018.
Latvia	2009	6	2009-2011; 2013; 2015; 2025-present	Miss Latvia	2	Top 20: Eva Caune (2011); Diana Kubasova (2013)	2011: Eva Caune (Top 20)	2013: Diana Kubasova (Top 20)	-
Lebanon	2011	3	2011, 2014, 2018	Miss Lebanon	1	Top 20: Daniella Rahme (2011)	2011: Daniella Rahme (Top 20)	2011: Daniella Rahme (Top 20)	-
Lesotho	2022	1	2022	Face of Lesotho	0	-	-	-	-
Lithuania	2009	6	2009-2012, 2015, 2019	Miss Lithuania	1	Top 20: Eglė Štandtaitė-Brogienė (2010)	2010: Eglė Štandtaitė-Brogienė (Top 20)	2010: Eglė Štandtaitė-Brogienė (Top 20)	-
Luxembourg	2013	3	2013-2015	Miss Luxembourg	1	Top 20: Heloise Paulmier (2013)	2013: Heloise Paulmier (Top 20)	2013: Heloise Paulmier (Top 20)	-
Macau	2013	6	2013; 2015-2016; 2019; 2025-present	Miss Macau	1	Top 24: Luiyu Li (2026)	2026: Luiyu Li (Top 24)	2026: Luiyu Li (Top 24)	Won Miss Congeniality 2013.
Malaysia	2013	9	2013-2016, 2018, 2022-2025	Miss World Malaysia	4	Top 10: Tanisha Demour (2015)	2015: Tanisha Demour (Top 10)	2023: Deidre Walker (Top 24)	Won Miss Talent 2013; Best Smile 2014.
Mali	2010	1	2010	Miss Mali	0	-	-	-	-
Malta	2015	7	2015-2022; 2024-present	Miss World Malta	0	-	-	-	-
Martinique	2013	1	2013	Martinique Queens	0	-	-	-	-
Mauritius	2014	7	2014-2016, 2018-2019, 2022-2023	Miss Estrella Mauritius	3	Top 12: Alexandrine Belle-Étoile (2022)	2016: Ambika Geetanjalee (Top 25)	2022: Alexandrine Belle-Étoile (Top 12)	Won Supranational Africa 2016, 2018, 2022; Miss Friendship 2015.
Mexico	2010	13	2010, 2013-present	Miss Mexico	9	1st runner-up: Jacqueline Morales (2013)	2013: Jacqueline Morales (1st runner-up)	2025: Angie Melchum (Top 24)	Won Miss Fashion City 2015; Best National Costume 2018, 2019; Miss Supranational Americas 2024; From The Ground Up 2025.
Moldova	2009	5	2009-2011, 2013, 2018	Miss Moldova	1	Top 15: Ana Velesco (2009)	2009: Ana Velesco (Top 15)	2009: Ana Velesco (Top 15)	Won Miss Top Model 2013.
Mongolia	2014	2	2014, 2016	Miss World Mongolia	0	-	-	-	-
Montenegro	2012	2	2012, 2018	Miss Montenegro	0	-	-	-	-
Morocco	2014	2	2014-2015	Miss Maroc	0				-
Mozambique	2023	1	2023	Miss Mozambique	0	-	-	-	-
Myanmar	2013	8	2013-2019; 2024-present	Miss Supranational Myanmar	6	Top 10: Han Thi (2014); Swe Zin Htet (2016)	2013: Khin Wint Wah (Top 20)	2024: Myo Sandar Win (Top 25)	Won Miss Internet 2013, 2014, 2015; Miss Supranational Asia and Oceania 2014; Best Evening Dress 2015; Miss Influencer 2024.
Namibia	2011	10	2011-2012; 2017-2023; 2025-present	Miss Namibia	4	Winner: Chanique Rabe (2021)	2019: Yana Haenisch (1st runner-up)	2026: Cassia Sharpley (Top 24)	Won Miss Congeniality 2012; Best Body 2017.
Nepal	2016	8	2016, 2018-present	Miss Nepal	1	Top 24: Dikshya Awasthi (2025)	2025: Dikshya Awasthi (Top 24)	2025: Dikshya Awasthi (Top 24)	-
Netherlands	2010	12	2010-2011, 2013-present	Miss Nederland	5	Top 12: Swelia Da Silva Antonio (2021); Luna-Isabella Stienstra (2023)	2016: Milenka Janssen (Top 25)	2023: Luna-Isabella Stienstra (Top 12)	Won Miss Elegance 2019; Best Influencer 2019.
New Zealand	2010	9	2010-2011; 2013-2015; 2018-2019; 2024-2025	Miss Universe New Zealand (2010-2019); Miss New Zealand International (2023-present)	1	Top 25: Eva Wilson (2019)	2019: Eva Wilson (Top 25)	2019: Eva Wilson (Top 25)	Won Miss Supranational Oceania 2019.
Nicaragua	2013	4	2013, 2023-2025	Miss Supranational Nicaragua	0	-	-	-	Won Best National Costume 2013. Miss Talent 2025
Nigeria	2010	14	2010-2013, 2015-2016, 2018-present	Most Beautiful Girl in Nigeria	3	3rd runner-up: Ndah Eno (2026)	2018: Daniella Orumwense (Top 25)	2026: Ndah Eno (3rd runner- up)	-
Northern Ireland	2009	7	2009, 2011-2015, 2019	Miss Northern Ireland	0	-	-	-	-
North Macedonia	2010	3	2010-2012	Miss Macedonia	0	-	-	-	-
Norway	2012	7	2012-2015; 2017; 2021; 2025-present	Miss Norway	0	-	-	-	-
Pakistan	2018	2	2018; 2024; 2026 - present	Miss Pakistan	1	Top 25: Anzhelika Tahir (2018)	2018: Anzhelika Tahir (Top 25)	2018: Anzhelika Tahir (Top 25)	-
Panama	2009	15	2009-2024	Señorita Panamá	7	Winner: Karina Pinilla (2010)	2010: Karina Pinilla (Winner)	2021: Darelys Santos (Top 24)	Won Best National Costume 2010, 2017, 2018; Miss Supranational Americas 2012, 2015; Best Body 2015; Top Model 2021.
Paraguay	2010	10	2010, 2015-2024; 2026 - present	Miss Paraguay	2	Winner: Stephania Stegman (2015)	2015: Stephania Stegman (Winner)	2016: Viviana Florentin (Top 25)	-
Peru	2009	12	2009-2011, 2014-2017, 2019-present	Miss Peru	8	3rd runner-up: Claudia Villafuerte (2010); Janick Maceta (2019)	2009: Nancy Cava (Top 15)	2024: Nathaly Terrones (Top 25)	Won Best National Costume 2022; Miss Supranational Americas 2023.
Philippines	2011	15	2011-present	The Miss Philippines	14	Winner: Mutya Datul (2013); Katrina Llegado (2026)	2012: Elaine Moll (3rd runner-up)	2026: Katrina Llegado (Winner)	Won Miss Personality 2013; Miss Internet 2016; Miss Congeniality 2017; Miss Talent 2022; Supra Chat 2023; Miss Supranational Asia and Oceania 2024.
Poland	2009	17	2009-present	Miss Polski	16	Winner: Monika Lewczuk (2011)	2009: Klaudia Ungerman (2nd runner-up)	2026: Oliwia Mikulska (Top 12)	Won Miss Supranational Europe 2010, 2017, 2021, 2022; Miss Semilac 2017.
Portugal	2010	13	2010-present	Miss República Portuguesa	2	Top 10: Priscila Alves (2017)	2010: Olívia Ortiz (Top 20)	2017: Priscila Alves (Top 10)	Won Miss Elegance 2012; Miss Talent 2017.
Puerto Rico	2010	15	2010-present	Miss Puerto Rico	11	Winner: Valeria Vazquez (2018)	2011: Velery Veléz (2nd runner-up)	2025: Valerie Klepadlo (4th runner-up)	Won Miss Photogenic 2013; Miss Supranational Americas 2014; Top Model Americas 2021; Miss Supranational Caribbean 2024.
Réunion	2013	1	2013	Miss Réunion	0	-	-	-	-
Romania	2009	15	2009-present	Miss Universe Romania	8	3rd runner-up: Bianca Tirsin (2017)	2010: Laura Barzoiu (Top 10)	2024: Andreea Ioana Stan (Top 25)	Won Best Evening Dress 2016; Miss Supranational Europe 2018.
Russia	2009	10	2009-2011, 2013, 2015-2021	Miss Russia	4	Top 20: Jana Dubnik (2013)	2010: Yevgeniya Shcherbakova (Top 20)	2018: Guzaliya Izmailova (Top 25)	Won Top Model 2009, 2010;Best Body 2016; Best National Costume 2018.
Rwanda	2011	10	2011-2021	Miss Rwanda	2	Top 20: Sonia Gisa (2015)	2015: Sonia Gisa (Top 20)	2016: Colombe Akiwacu (Top 25)	Won Miss Personality 2012; Miss Supranational Africa 2015.
Sao Tome and Principe	2014	2	2014, 2017	Miss São Tomé and Príncipe	0	-	-	-	-
Scotland	2009	8	2009-2010, 2012, 2014-2017, 2019	Miss Scotland	0	-	-	-	Won Miss Talent 2010; Miss Congeniality 2019.
Serbia	2010	5	2010-2013, 2017	Miss Serbia	1	Top 25: Bojana Bojanić (2017)	2017: Bojana Bojanić (Top 25)	2017: Bojana Bojanić (Top 25)	-
Sierra Leone	2013	4	2013; 2019-2021; 2024	Miss Sierra Leone	0	-	-	-	-
Singapore	2011	7	2011, 2015-2019, 2022	Miss Singapore World	1	Top 25: Naomi Huth (2019)	2019: Naomi Huth (Top 25)	2019: Naomi Huth (Top 25)	Won Miss Congeniality 2018; Miss Talent 2019.
Slovakia	2009	13	2009-2011, 2013, 2015-2024	Miss Universe Slovenskej Republiky	5	Top 10: Petra Denkova (2015); Lenka Tekeljakova (2016)	2009: Linda Mosatova (Top 15)	2024: Petra Sivakova (Top 25)	Won Miss Supranational Europe 2009; Supra Model of The Year 2024 Winner.
Slovenia	2009	6	2009-2012, 2014, 2018	Miss Slovenia	2	2nd runner-up: Sandra Marinović (2010)	2010: Sandra Marinović (2nd runner-up)	2011: Suzana Matic (Top 20)	Won Miss Photogenic 2010.
South Africa	2011	13	2011-2013, 2016-present	African Beauty International	7	Winner: Lalela Mswane (2022)	2011: Dhesha Jeram (Top 20)	2025: Lebohang Raputsoe (Top 24)	Won Miss Supranational Africa 2011, 2012, 2024; Miss Congeniality; Miss Friendship 2024.
South Sudan	2017	2	2017, 2021	Miss South Sudan	1	Top 25: Anyier Deng Yuol (2017)	2017: Anyier Deng Yuol (Top 25)	2017: Anyier Deng Yuol (Top 25)	Won Miss Supranational Africa 2017; Top Model Africa 2021.
Spain	2010	15	2010, 2012-present	RNB España	6	Top 10: Celia Vallespir (2014)	2012: Nieves Sánchez (Top 20)	2026: Nelly Mestre (Top 12)	Won Miss Warsaw Expo 2015; Miss Elegance 2017.
Sri Lanka	2013	3	2013, 2016, 2019	Miss World Sri Lanka	1	3rd runner-up: Ornella Gunesekere (2016)	2016: Ornella Gunesekere (3rd runner-up)	2016: Ornella Gunesekere (3rd runner-up)	-
Suriname	2011	10	2011-2021	Miss Suriname	2	2nd runner-up: Jaleesa Pigot (2016)	2012: Periskia Laing (Top 10)	2016: Jaleesa Pigot (2nd runner-up)	Won Miss Photogenic 2016; Miss Supranational Caribbean 2018.
Sweden	2010	9	2010-2016, 2018, 2021	Miss Sweden	1	Top 20: Ida Ovmar (2014)	2014: Ida Ovmar (Top 20)	2014: Ida Ovmar (Top 20)	Won Miss Elegance 2010, 2013; Best Body 2011; Miss Bikini 2014
Switzerland	2013	6	2013-2018	Miss Universe Switzerland	1	Top 20: Mylene Clavien (2014)	2014: Mylene Clavien (Top 20)	2014: Mylene Clavien (Top 20)	-
Taiwan	2009	3	2009-2010, 2015	Miss Taiwan	1	Top 15: Liu Xiao’ou (2009)	2009: Liu Xiao’ou (Top 15)	2009: Liu Xiao’ou (Top 15)	Won Miss Supranational Asia and Oceania 2009.
Tanzania	2026	1	2026-present	Miss Tanzania	1	Top 12: Tracy Nabukeera (2026)	2026: Tracy Nabukeera (Top 12)	2026: Tracy Nabukeera (Top 12)	
Thailand	2010	16	2010-present	Mister and Miss Supranational Thailand	12	Winner: Anntonia Porsild (2019)	2010: Maythavee Burapasing (4th runner-up)	2026: Kanyalak Nookaew (Top 24)	Won Miss Internet 2012, Best National Costume 2023.
The Bahamas	2009	6	2009-2011, 2013, 2021, 2023	Miss Bahamas	1	Top 15: Kendra Wilkinson (2009)	2009: Kendra Wilkinson (Top 15)	2009: Kendra Wilkinson (Top 15)	Won Miss Congeniality 2009, 2021; Miss Personality 2009, 2010.
Togo	2011	5	2011; 2013; 2018; 2023; 2025	Miss Togo	0	-	-	-	-
Trinidad and Tobago	2014	7	2014-2016, 2019-2025	Miss Trinidad and Tobago	5	Top 20: Yia-Loren Gomez (2014)	2014: Tinnitia Griffith (Top 20)	2022: Christin Coeppicus (Top 24)	Won Supra Chat 2021.
Turkey	2010	14	2010-2019; 2022-2023; 2025-present	Miss Turkey	2	2nd runner-up: Leyla Köse (2013)	2013: Leyla Köse (2nd runner-up)	2026: İlayda Güvenç (Top 24)	Won Miss Elegance 2022.
Ukraine	2009	13	2009-2011, 2013-2016, 2018-2019, 2022-2025	Miss Ukraine	6	Winner: Oksana Moria (2009)	2009: Oksana Moria (Winner)	2025: Kateryna Bilyk (Top 12)	Won Miss Photogenic 2009, 2011. Supra Fan Vote 2025
United Kingdom	2023	4	2023-present	Miss United Kingdom	3	3rd runner-up: Emma Collingridge (2023)	2023: Emma Collingridge (3rd runner-up)	2025: Brittany Feeney (Top 12)	-
United States	2011	15	2011-present	Miss Supranational USA	7	1st runner-up: Katrina Dimaranan (2018); Jenna Dykstra (2024)	2011: Krystelle Khoury (4th runner-up)	2026: Marley Stokes (Top 24)	Won Miss Fashion World 2014; Best Body 2018; Miss Supranational Americas 2019, 2025.
Uruguay	2013	3	2013; 2022; 2024	Miss Uruguay	0	-	-	-	-
United States Virgin Islands	2011	5	2011; 2013; 2019; 2024-2025	Miss US Virgin Islands	1	4th runner-up: Esonica Veira (2013)	2013: Esonica Veira (4th runner-up)	2013: Esonica Veira (4th runner-up)	-
Venezuela	2009	17	2009-present	Miss Earth Venezuela	9	1st runner-up: Valeria Vespoli (2016)	2010: Laksmi Rodríguez (Top 20)	2026: Silvia Maestre (Top 12)	Won Miss Supranational Americas 2010, 2016; Best Evening Dress 2017; Miss Photogenic 2018; Supra Chat 2021.
Vietnam	2009	13	2009, 2011-2012, 2015-2019, 2022-present	Miss Supranational Vietnam	9	2nd runner-up: Nguyễn Huỳnh Kim Duyên (2022)	2009: Chung Thuc Quyen (Top 15)	2026: Quỳnh Mai Ngô (Top 12)	Won Miss Internet 2009, 2017; Best National Costume 2009, 2016, 2018; Miss Supranational Asia and Oceania 2012; Miss Supranational Asia 2018, 2019; Miss St. George 2012; Miss Social Media 2015; Best Evening Dress 2018; Supra Chat 2022; Supra Fan-Vote 2023.
Wales	2010	9	2010-2017, 2019	Miss Wales	1	Top 25: Rachel Tate (2017)	2017: Rachel Tate (Top 25)	2017: Rachel Tate (Top 25)	-
Zambia	2019	4	2019; 2022-2023; 2025-present	Miss Zambia	1	Top 24: NaMakau Nawa (2025)	2025: NaMakau Nawa (Top 24)	2025: NaMakau Nawa (Top 24)	Won Miss Supranational Africa 2025; Supra Model of The Year 2025
Zimbabwe	2011	7	2011; 2013; 2017; 2022-2023; 2025-present	Miss Zimbabwe	2	Top 24: Sakhile Dube (2023); Nicole Nyawera (2026)	2023: Sakhile Dube (Top 24)	2026: Nicole Nyawera (Top 24)	Won Supra Model 2023; Miss Supranational Africa 2023.

== National franchises ==
National franchises have a lot of latitude in choosing candidates for Miss Supranational. Some are the winners of individual contests for their Miss Supranational, others get the honor by winning first or second runner-up from contests for candidates to multiple international pageants, and yet others are chosen in different ways.

=== Cameroon ===
The CAB (Cameroon Ambassadors of Beauty) is now the Cameroon national director for the Miss Supranational 2025 pageant.

=== Croatia ===
Tihana Babij won Miss Supranational Croatia 2018 after defeating 17 regional Croatia contestants; she herself comes from Vienna and was the representative of the Croatian diaspora.

=== Ecuador ===
Justeen Cruz was picked Miss Supranational Ecuador 2020 via an online competition due to the COVID-19 pandemic.

=== Gibraltar ===
Aisha Benyahya became Miss Supranational Gibraltar 2016 after winning second place at Miss Gibraltar.

=== India ===
Asha Bhat, Miss Supranational India 2014, and the eventual winner of Miss Supranational 2014, had been second runner up at Miss Diva 2014. Srinidhi Shetty was crowned Miss supranational 2016 After winning Miss Diva Supranational Crown in 2016 alongside India's representative to Mr Supranational Jitesh Thakur also won Second Runner up title who was also send by Times group and Altamash Faraz became Mister Supranational India 2017.after placing second runner-up in Mr India 2016. In 2018 India won Mr Supranational with Prathamesh making India the only country till date to win both subsidiaries.Shefali Sood became the Miss Supranational India 2019 representative at Miss Diva 2019. Aavriti Choudhary won Miss India Supranational 2020 during Miss Diva 2020.

=== Indonesia ===
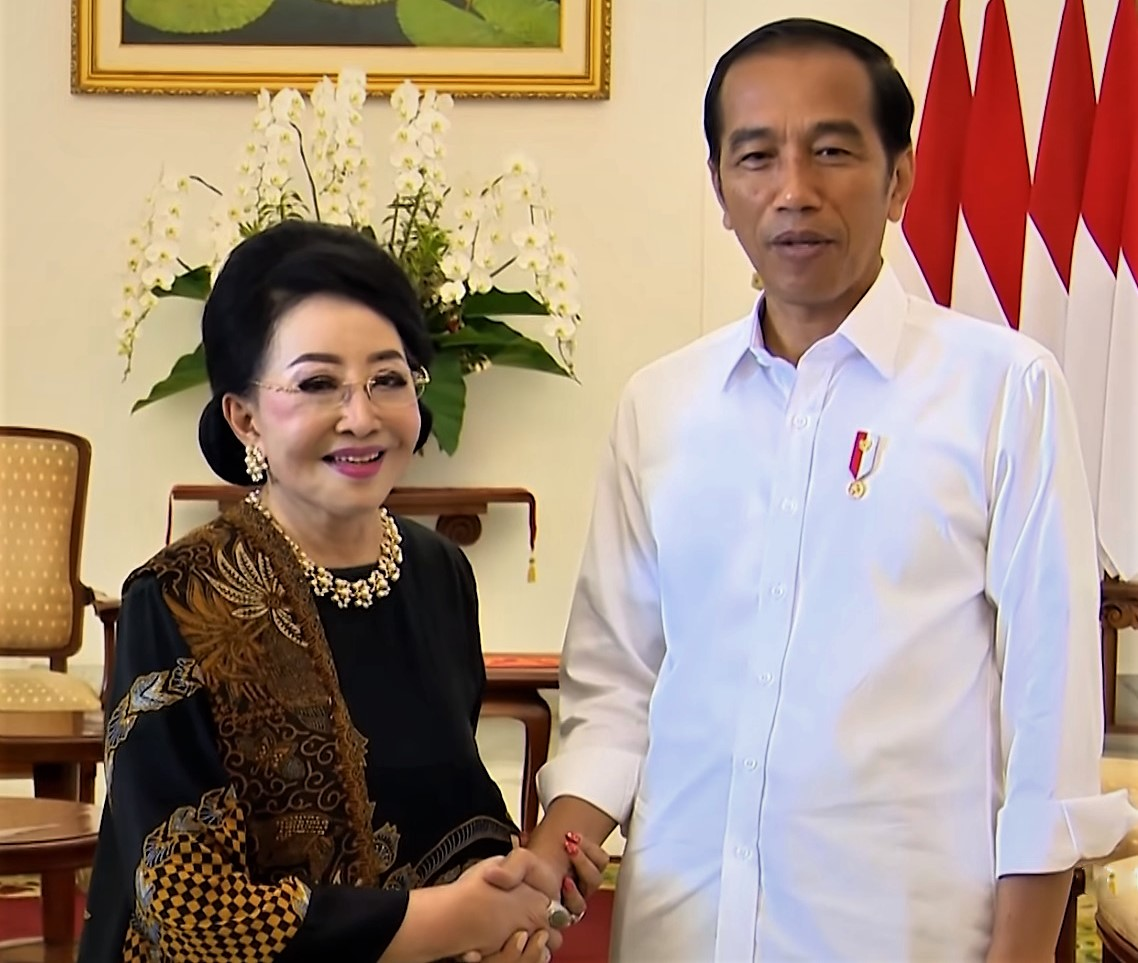
The president and CEO of Puteri Indonesia Org., The Royal Highest Princess Mooryati Soedibyo of Surakarta Sunanate, meeting with President Joko Widodo in Bogor Presidential Palace.

Puteri Indonesia Pariwisata (Javanese: (Hanacaraka) ꦦꦸꦠꦺꦫꦶꦆꦤ꧀ꦢꦺꦴꦤꦺꦱꦦꦫꦶꦮꦶꦱꦠ; literally translates into: "Princess Indonesia Tourism" or "Miss Supranational Indonesia") is one of the titles granted by the Puteri Indonesia beauty pageant. The winners of Puteri Indonesia Pariwisata represent Indonesia in Miss Supranational. The president-owner of Puteri Indonesia Pariwisata are The Royal Highest Family of Surakarta Sunanate, Princess Mooryati Soedibyo and Princess Putri Kuswisnuwardhani.

Puteri Indonesia Pariwisata is traditionally crowned in March, alongside the celebration of International Women's Day. The first Puteri Indonesia Pariwisata to compete in Miss Supranational was Cokorda Istri Krisnanda Widani from Bali in 2013. The 2011 and 2012 winners (Alessandra Khadijah Usman and Andi Tenri Gusti Harnum Utari Natassa) competed in Miss Asia Pacific World. The participation of Indonesia in Miss Supranational were continuing by Intan Aletrino became Miss Supranational Indonesia 2016 by winning Puteri Indonesia Pariwisata 2016. Karina Nadila Niab was Miss Supranational Indonesia 2017 after winning Puteri Indonesia Pariwisata 2017, and since then the winner of Puteri Indonesia Pariwisata was automatically represent Indonesia to Miss Supranational till now.

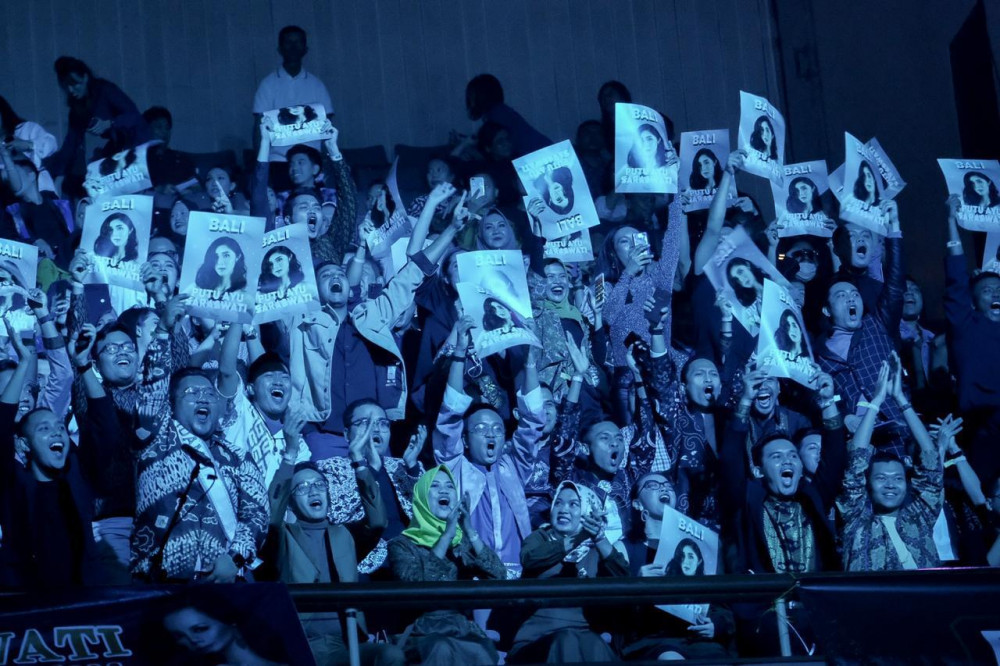
"Indonesian Pageant-Lover" gave their support as the candidates competed on the Puteri Indonesia final coronation night.

In 2019, Joko Widodo announced the Puteri Indonesia Organization as "National Intangible Cultural Heritage of Indonesia", which carries the values of Indonesian culture and society togetherness, to celebrate the role of women in the creative industry, environment, tourism, education and social awareness. In line with that, Angela Tanoesoedibjo the eldest daughter of media magnate MNC Group Hary Tanoesoedibjo and Miss Indonesia President and Chief Executive Officer Liliana Tanaja Tanoesoedibjo chosen as The Deputy of Ministry of tourism and Creative Economy of The Republic of Indonesia by the President of Indonesia, Joko Widodo at the Istana Negara Palace in Central Jakarta. Generally, the final coronation night of the pageant was annually broadcast on Indosiar, but the 2007 and 2019–present edition was broadcast on SCTV, which means both of SCM Network Televisions is the official broadcaster of Puteri Indonesia.

The reigning Puteri Indonesia Pariwisata 2020 is Jihane Almira Chedid of Central Java, who was crowned on 6 March 2020 in Jakarta Convention Center. She will represent Indonesia at the 12th edition of Miss Supranational 2021 beauty pageant.

Gallery of winners: The winners of Puteri Indonesia Pariwisata (Miss Supranational Indonesia)

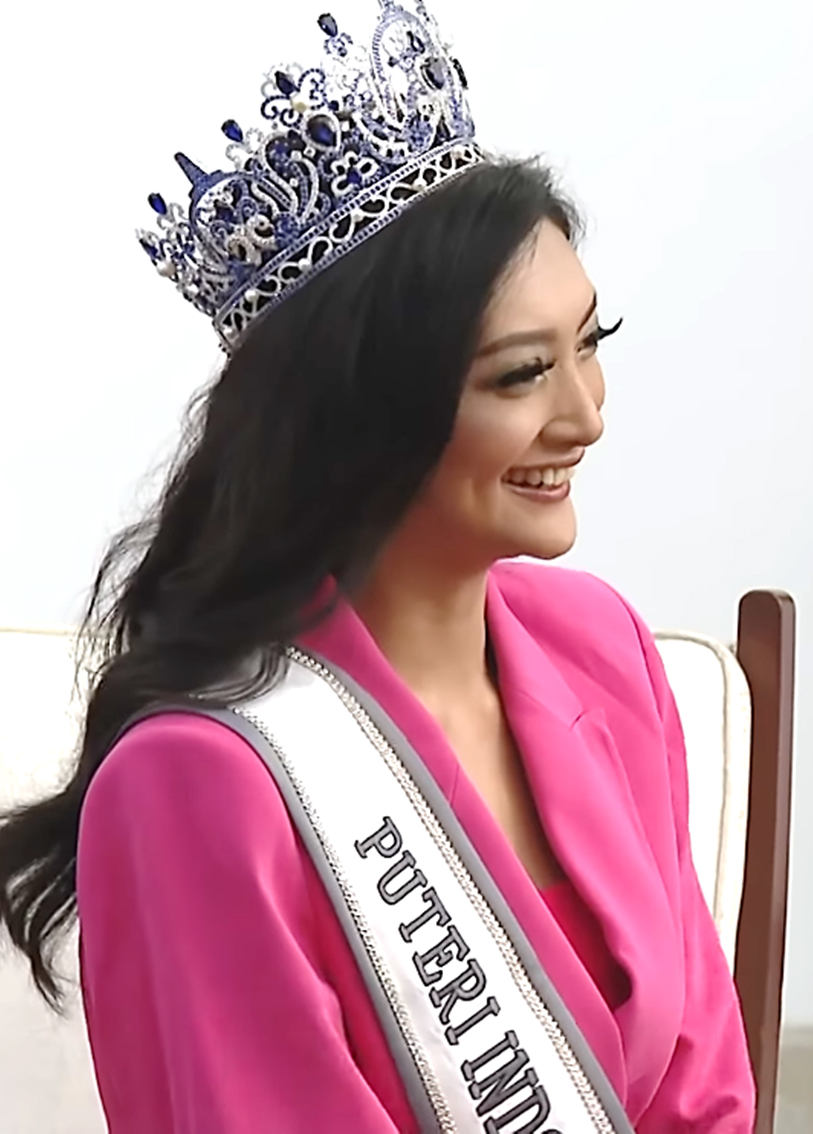
Puteri Indonesia Pariwisata 2022
Adinda Cresheilla

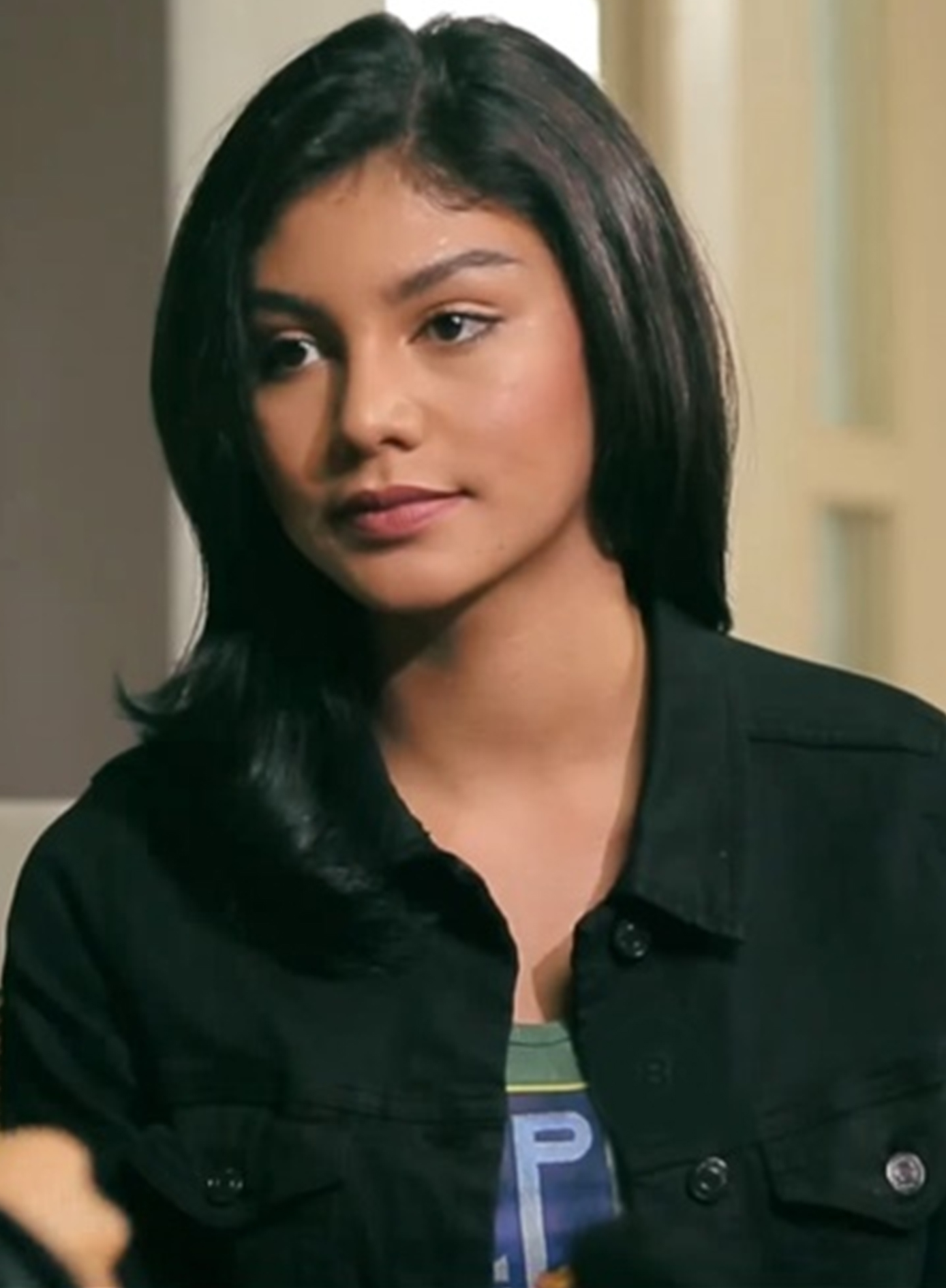
Puteri Indonesia Pariwisata 2020-2021
Jihane Almira Chedid

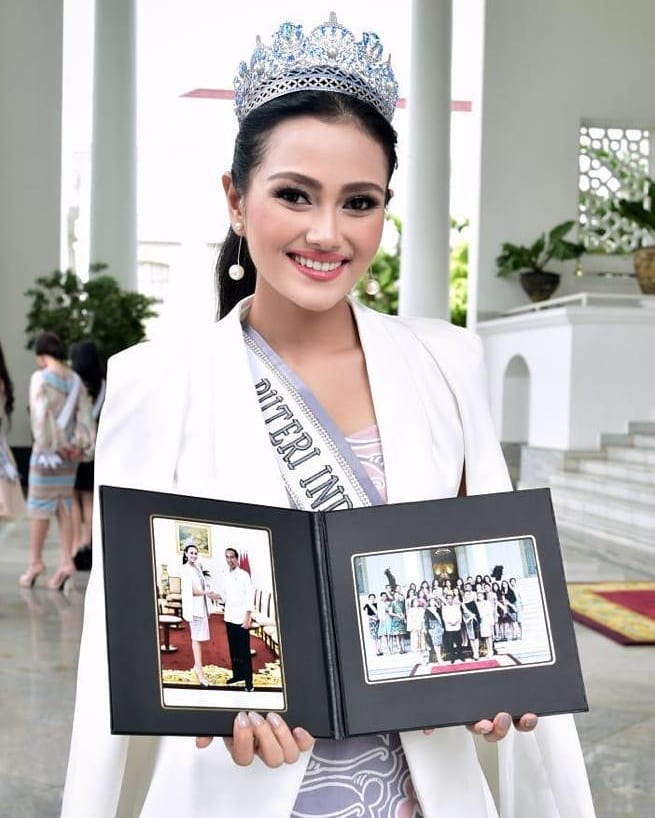
Puteri Indonesia Pariwisata 2019
Jesica Fitriana Martasari

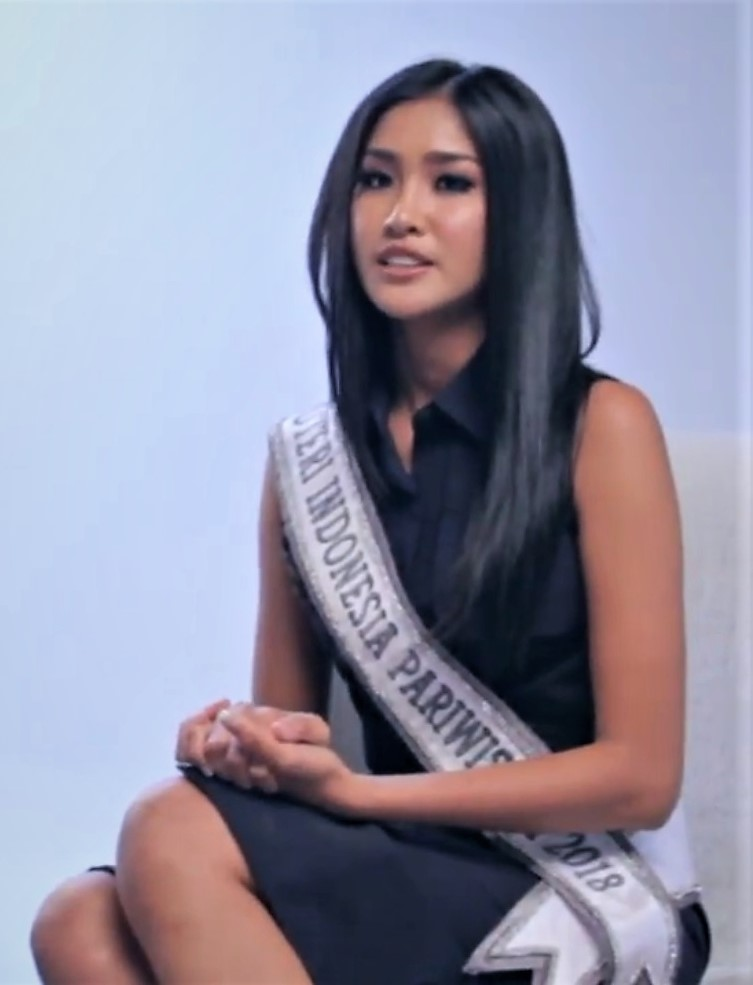
Puteri Indonesia Pariwisata 2018
Wilda Octaviana Situngkir

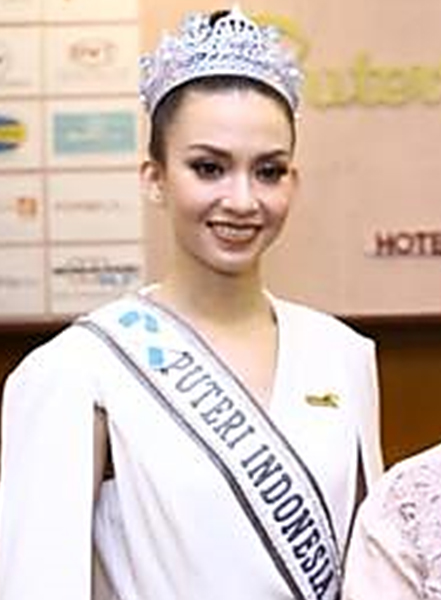
Puteri Indonesia Pariwisata 2017
Karina Nadila Niab

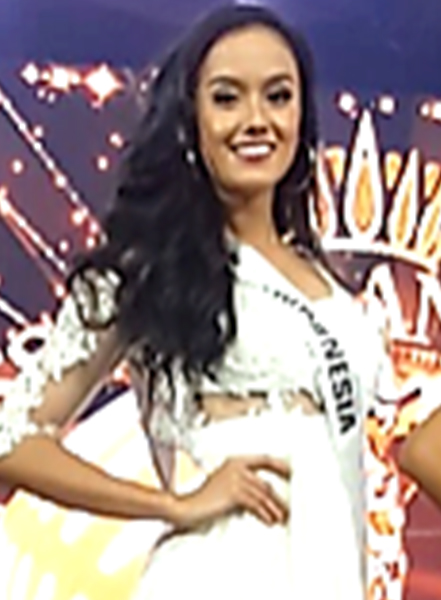
Puteri Indonesia Pariwisata 2016
Intan Aletrinö

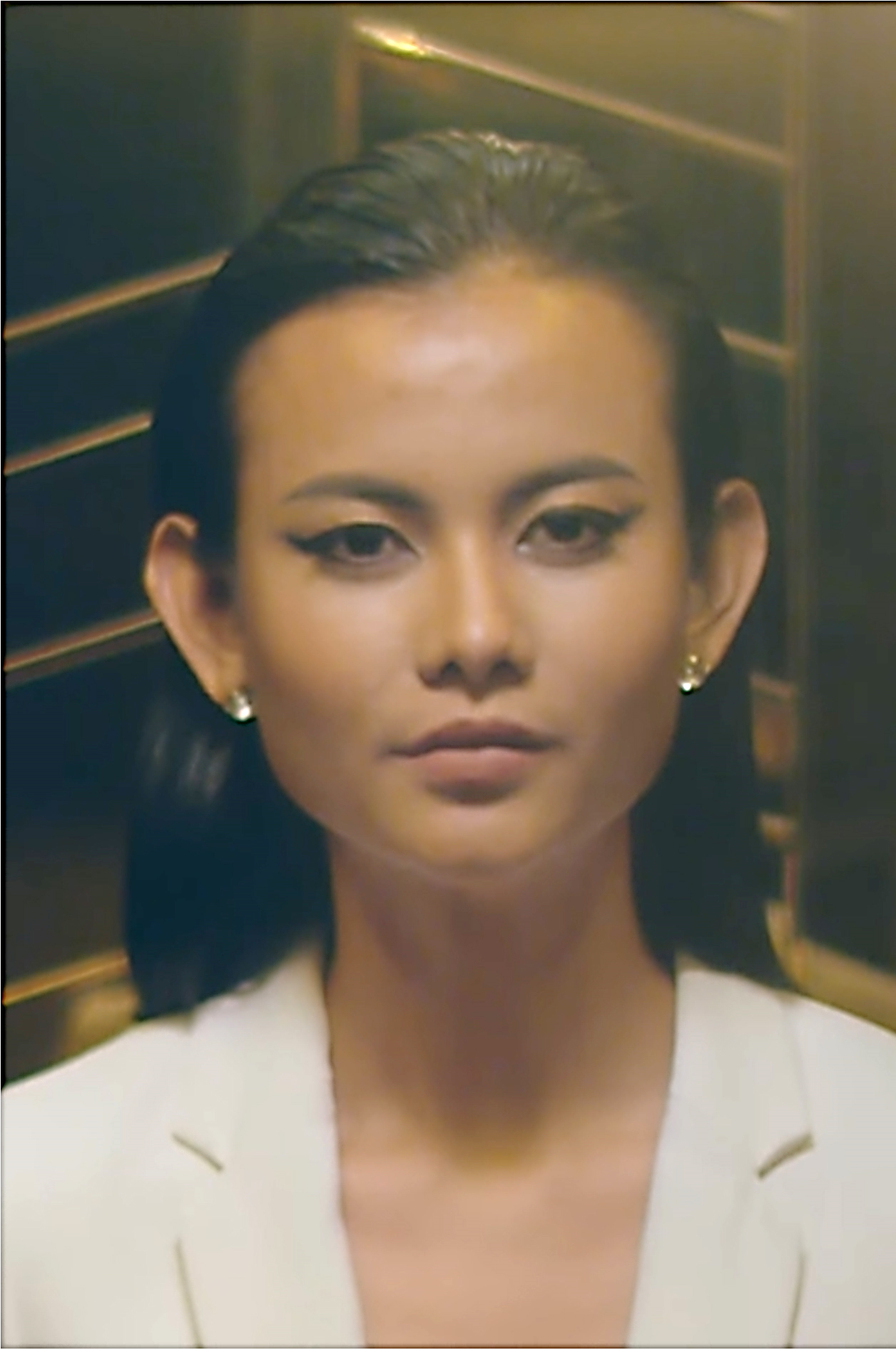
Puteri Indonesia Pariwisata 2015
Gresya Amanda Maaliwuga

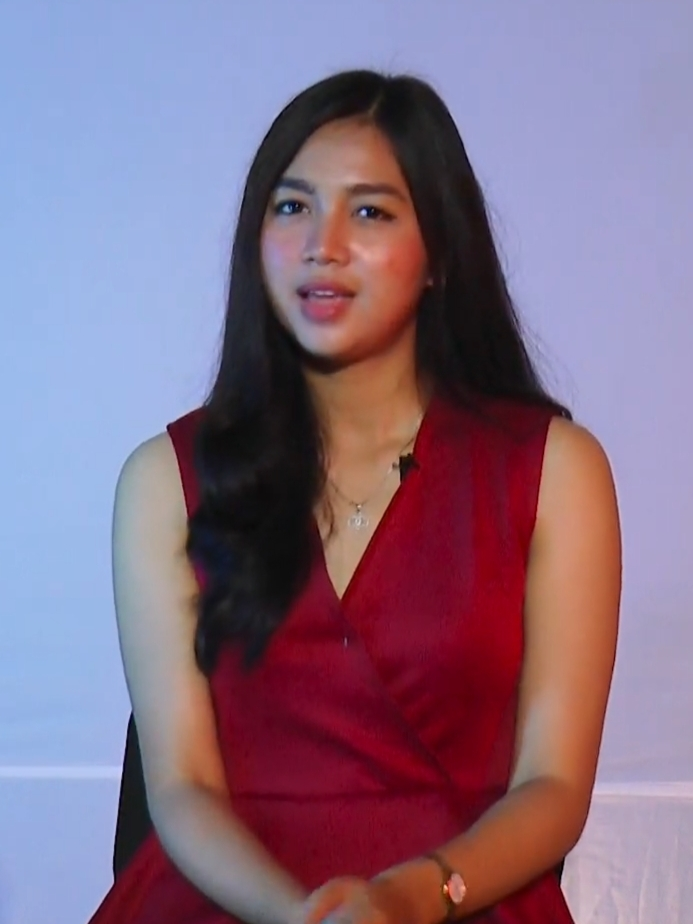
Puteri Indonesia Pariwisata 2014
Lily Estelita Liana

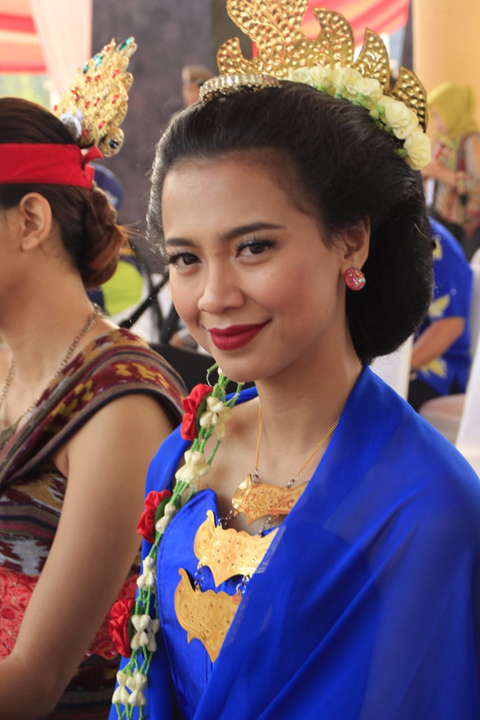
Puteri Indonesia Pariwisata 2007
Ika Fiyonda Putri

=== Jamaica ===
Franz Christie was chosen Mister Supranational Jamaica 2017 at the United Nations Pageants, separately from and before the Miss Supranational Jamaica candidate. Rayon Davis and Kimberly Dawkins were chosen Mister and Miss Jamaica Supranational 2019 together.

=== Japan ===
Yurika Nakamoto was selected Miss Supranational Japan 2018, defeating 30 candidates, at the same pageant that also selected Miss United Continents Japan 2018, and Miss Asia Pacific International Japan 2018.

=== Laos ===
Kithsada Vongsaysavath was selected Miss Supranational Lao 2017 after winning second runner-up at Miss Grand Laos 2017.

=== Mauritius ===
Urvashi Hureeram became Miss Supranational Mauritius 2019 as first runner-up to Miss Universe Mauritius 2019.

=== Myanmar ===
Khin Wint Wah was selected as the first Miss Supranational Myanmar, in 2013, by defeating 99 other contestants in a general knowledge test, rather than a beauty contest. Swe Zin Htet became Miss Supranational Myanmar 2016 by winning the Miss Golden Land Myanmar contest, which also sent contestants to Miss Earth, Miss Intercontinental, Face of Beauty International, Miss Tourism International and Miss Globe.

=== Nigeria ===
Oluchi Kalu became Miss Supranational Nigeria 2019 after being first runner-up at the 2019 Beauty of Africa International Pageant.

In August 2021, The Beauty of Africa International Pageant, terminated their contract in sending contestant to Miss Supranational due to the alleged ceaseless discrimination of African contestant and continual increase in their license fees according to the Nigerian national pageant director, Daniel Opuene. The Most Beautiful Girl in Nigeria pageant began selecting candidates for Miss Supranational Nigeria since 2021.

=== Philippines ===
The Philippines sent their first representative in 2012 through Binibining Pilipinas. Elaine Kay Moll, the First Runner-up of Binibining Pilipinas 2012, competed at the 4th edition of Miss Supranational and eventually won as the Third Runner-up, making the first Filipina to enter the semis and the first Filipina to place in the pageant. In 2013, Mutya Joanna Datul became the first Filipina and the first Asian to win. She also bagged the Miss Personality award.

Since 2014, Binibining Pilipinas sent their third placer to compete. Joanna Louise Eden and Resham Saeed placed Top 25 in 2016 and 2019 respectively, Yvette Marie Santiago and Rogelie Catacutan placed Top 20 in 2014 and 2015 respectively, Jehza Huelar placed Top 10 in 2018, and Chanel Olive Thomas placed Top 10 and won Miss Congeniality in 2017.

The Miss Supranational franchise was moved to Miss World Philippines in 2020. It is until 2021 that they sent their second placer to the pageant. Dindi Joy Pajares was appointed due to the delay of the national pageant because of the COVID-19 pandemic, and eventually placed Top 12 in 2021. Danielle Alison Black placed Top 24 and won Miss Talent at the 13th edition.

The Miss Supranational franchise again was moved to Miss Universe Philippines, sending their second placer to the pageant. Pauline Amelinckx became the First Runner-up in 2023, bringing the Philippines back at the Top 5 after 10 years. She also won the Supra Chat challenge.

In 2023, the Miss Supranational franchise was moved to The Miss Philippines, a sister pageant of the Miss Universe Philippines under the Empire PH.

=== Nepal ===
Nepal has been sending delegates regularly to Miss Supranational since 2018, under The Hidden Treasure Miss Nepal. For 2018, Mahima Singh repressnted Nepal at Miss Supranational. In 2019, Rose Lama represented Nepal at Miss Supranational. Shimal Kanaujiya who was crowned Miss Supranational Nepal 2020 represented Nepal at Miss Supranational 2021.

Dr. Santosh Upadhyaya won the first Mister Supra-star Search 2020, and was given the first Mister Supranational Nepal 2021 title. He represented Nepal in 5th edition of Mister Supranational 2021 in Poland and emerged as the 3rd runner-up at Mr. Supranational. Later he was given the license of Miss and Mister Supranational Nepal, under the organization Sanurvi International. In 2022, Sanish Shrestha and Keshu Khadka were crowned Mister and Miss Supranational Nepal and represented their country in respective international pageants.

In 2024, Mister Supranational Nepal 2024 Dhiroj Kaji Basnet and Miss Supranational Nepal 2024 Sajina Khanal will represent Nepal.

=== Rwanda ===
Aurore Mutesi Kayibanda competed in Miss Supranational 2013 after winning Miss Rwanda 2012. Shanita Munyana won Miss Supranational Rwanda in 2019, winning Rwf1 million.

=== South Africa ===
Belinde Schroeder was crowned Miss Supranational South Africa 2018. The Miss South Africa pageant also began selecting candidates for Miss Supranational South Africa in 2020.

=== Trinidad & Tobago ===
Yia-Loren Gomez was the first Miss Trinidad and Tobago Supranational in 2019.

=== United States ===
In the United States, there are statewide Miss Supranational titles. Angela Ritossa was Miss Ohio Supranational 2017 before competing for Miss Supranational United States.

Since February 2018, the Miss Supranational USA franchise has been owned and directed by Cecilio Asuncion, founder of transgender modeling agency Slay Model Management.

=== Vietnam ===
Nguyễn Thị Ngọc Châu became the first official Miss Supranational Vietnam after winning in 2018, and placed Top 10 at Miss Supranational 2019.

Since 2022, the Miss Supranational Vietnam franchise has been owned by Uni Media.

== See also ==
- List of beauty contests
