= Edward John Cameron =

British colonial administrator (1858–1947)

Sir Edward John Cameron KCMG
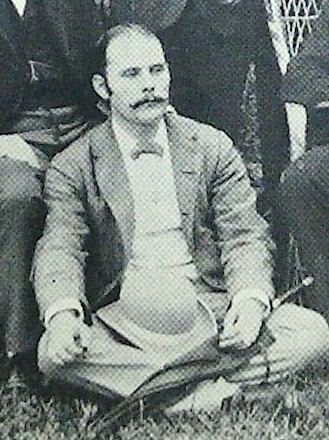

Personal details
- Born: 14 May 1858 Leamington, Warwickshire, England
- Died: 20 July 1947 (aged 89) Bath, Somerset, England
- Occupation: Colonial administrator

Sir Edward John Cameron, KCMG (14 May 1858 – 20 July 1947) was a British colonial administrator who served as governor of the Gambia from February 1914 to 1920.

== Early life and education ==
Born 14 May 1858, Cameron was the third son of John Charles Cameron MD, deputy surgeon-general of the British army, and Julia Elizabeth Mooyaart, daughter of James Mooyaart, auditor-general, Ceylon. Cameron was educated at Shrewsbury School and Clifton College, before entering Merton College, Oxford on 24 May 1877. On 12 April 1887 he married Eva Selwyn Isaacs (1858–1944), daughter of Australian barrister and politician Robert Macintosh Isaacs.

== Career ==
Commissioner of the Virgin Islands and member of the executive and legislative councils of the Leeward Islands from February 1887 to 1893. Commissioner of the Turks and Caicos Islands from 1893 to 1899. Administrator of Saint Vincent from May 1901 to March 1909. Acting Governor-in-Chief of the Windward Islands from June 1909 to October 1909. Commissioner of Saint Lucia from 11 March 1909 to 1914. Governor of the Gambia from 11 April 1914 until his retirement in July 1920. During his time in the Gambia, he instigated the first colonial investigation into the behaviour of Travelling Commissioner J K McCallum and his relationship with Fatou Khan.

Knighted CMG 30 June 1905 and KCMG 5 June 1916.
