= Miss Supranational 2013 =

5th Miss Supranational pageant, beauty pageant edition

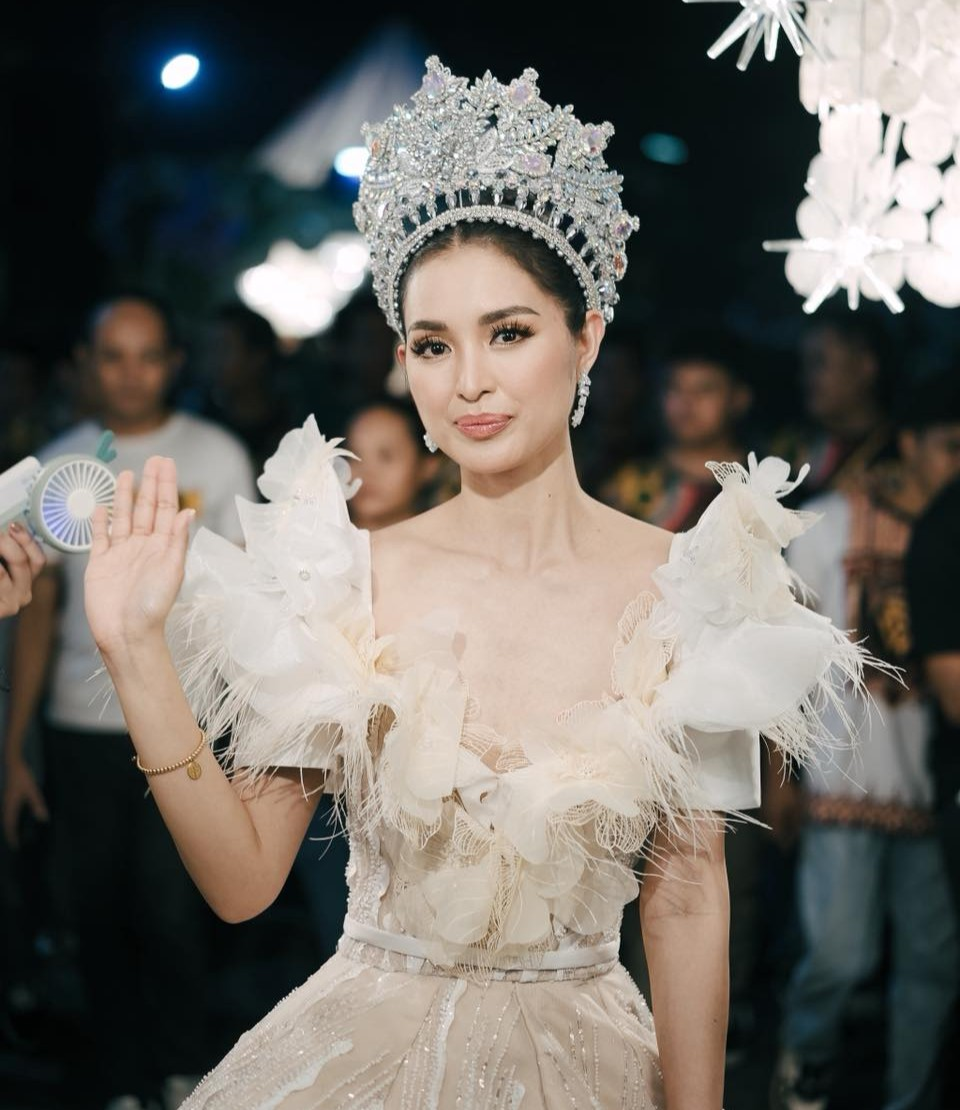
- Mutya Johanna Datul
- Date: 6 September 2013
- Presenters: Ivan Podrez; Denis Kuryan; Yekaterina Buraya
- Venue: Minsk Sports Palace, Minsk, Belarus
- Broadcaster: UStream
- Entrants: 83
- Placements: 20
- Debuts: Argentina; Australia; Côte d'Ivoire; Ghana; Guadeloupe; Indonesia; Jamaica; Luxembourg; Macao; Malaysia; Martinique; Mexico; Myanmar; Nicaragua; Réunion; Sierra Leone; Sri Lanka; Switzerland; Uruguay
- Withdrawals: Belize; Bosnia and Herzegovina; Cuba; Israel; Lithuania; Macedonia; Montenegro; Scotland; Slovenia; Vietnam
- Returns: Azerbaijan; Cameroon; China; Colombia; El Salvador; Equatorial Guinea; Finland; Guatemala; Haiti; Hong Kong; Iraq; Italy; Latvia; Moldova; Netherlands; New Zealand; Russia; Slovakia; Togo; Ukraine; United States Virgin Islands; Zimbabwe
- Winner: Mutya Johanna Datul; Philippines
- Congeniality: Sarah Leyshan (Macau)
- Best National Costume: Alejandra Gross (Nicaragua)
- Photogenic: Desirée Del Rio (Puerto Rico)

Miss Supranational 2013 was the fifth Miss Supranational pageant, held at the Minsk Sports Palace in Minsk, Belarus on 6 September 2013. This is the first edition of the pageant to be held outside of Poland.

Ekaterina Buraya of Belarus crowned Mutya Datul of the Philippines as Miss Supranational 2013 at the end of the event. She is the first Filipino and Asian to be crowned Miss Supranational.

Contestants from 83 countries and territories competed in this year's pageant. The pageant was hosted by Ivan Podrez, Denis Kuryan, and Yekaterina Buraya.

== Results ==
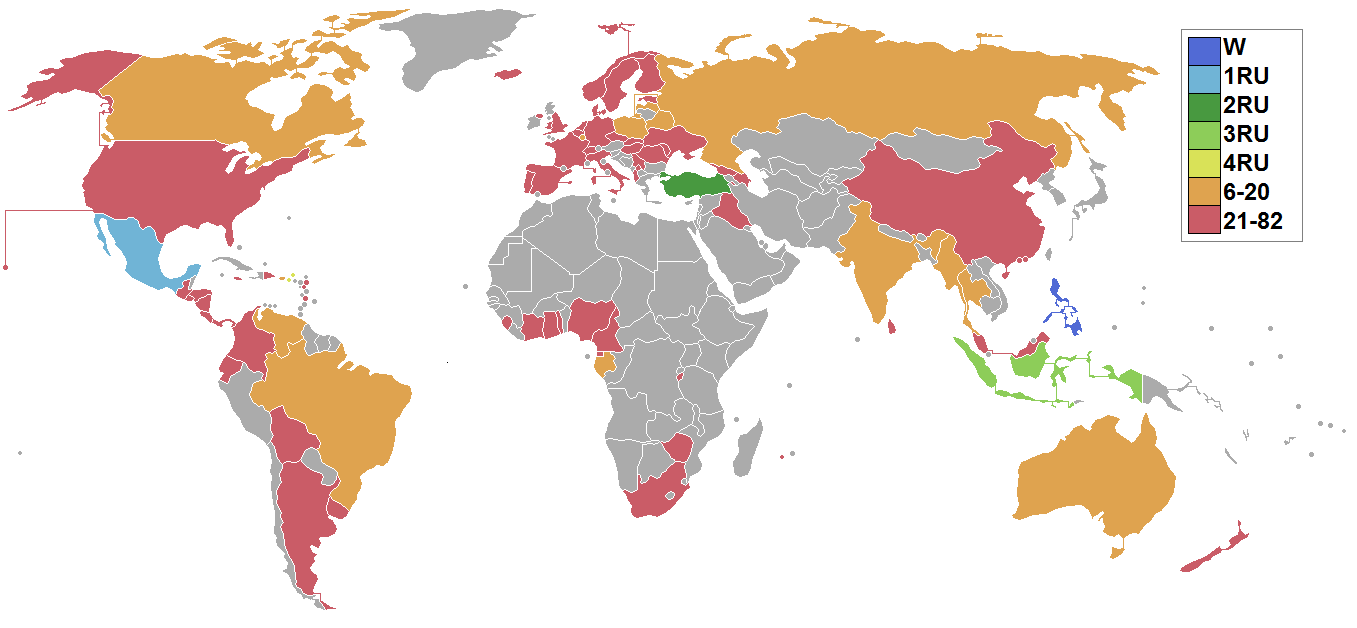
Countries and territories which sent delegates and results for Miss Supranational 2013

=== Placements ===
Placement	Contestant
Miss Supranational 2013	Philippines – Mutya Johanna Datul
1st Runner-Up	Mexico – Jacqueline Morales
2nd Runner-Up	Turkey – Leyla Köse
3rd Runner-Up	Indonesia – Cokorda Istri Krisnanda Widani
4th Runner-Up	United States Virgin Islands – Esonica Veira
Top 10	Australia – Esma Voloder; Belarus – Wieranika Czacyna; Brazil – Raquel Benetti; India – Vijaya Sharma; Poland – Angelika Ogryzek
Top 20	Canada – Suzette Hernandez; Gabon – Hillary Ondo; Latvia – Diana Kubasova; Luxembourg – Heloise Paulmier; Myanmar – Khin Wint Wah; Puerto Rico – Desireé Del Río; Russia – Yana Dubnik; Thailand – Thanyaporn Srisen; Ukraine – Kateryna Sandulowa; Venezuela – Annie Fuenmayor

=== Continental Queens of Beauty ===
Geographical Region	Contestant
Africa	Gabon – Hillary Ondo
Americas	Brazil – Raquel Benetti
Asia and Oceania	Australia – Esma Voloder
Europe	Belarus – Veronika Chachina

=== Special awards ===
Award	Contestant
Best National Costume	Nicaragua – Alejandra Gross
Miss Bikini	Iceland – Fanney Ingvarsdóttir
Miss Elegance	Sweden – Sally Lindgren
Miss Friendship	Macao – Sarah Leyshan
Miss Internet	Myanmar – Khin Wint Wah
Miss Personality	Philippines – Mutya Johanna Datul
Miss Photogenic	Puerto Rico – Desirée Del Rio
Miss Talent	Malaysia – Nancy Markus
Top Model	Moldova – Valeria Donu

== Contestants ==
Eighty-three contestants competed for the title.

Country/Territory	Contestant	Age (Note: Ages at the time of the pageant)	Hometown	Continental Group
Albania	Deisa Shehaj	20	Tirana	Europe
Argentina	Juliana Kawka	20	Buenos Aires	Americas
Australia	Esma Voloder	21	Melbourne	Oceania
Azerbaijan	Samira Akmanova	20	Baku	Europe
Belarus	Veronika Chachina	17	Gomel	Europe
Belgium	Karen Op't Eynde	19	Overijse	Europe
Bolivia	Teresa Talamás	20	Beni	Americas
Brazil	Raquel Benetti	26	São Francisco de Paula	Americas
Cameroon	Johanna Medio Akamba	23	Yaoundé	Africa
Canada	Suzette Hernandez	27	Vancouver	Americas
China	Liu Qiang	21	Beijing	Asia
Colombia	Isabel Cristina Asprilla	24	Bahía Solano	Americas
Costa Rica	Elena Correa	22	San José	Americas
Côte d'Ivoire	Reine Aka	20	Abidjan	Africa
Czech Republic	Lucie Klukavá	21	Ostrava	Europe
Denmark	Alexandria Eissinger	23	Roskilde	Europe
Dominican Republic	Alba Aquino	23	Higüey	Caribbean
Ecuador	Giuliana Villavicencio	23	Guayaquil	Americas
El Salvador	Metzi Solano	23	Santa Ana	Americas
England	Rachel Christie	24	London	Europe
Equatorial Guinea	Lisa Ngondek	18	Malabo	Africa
Estonia	Xenia Likhacheva	23	Tallinn	Europe
Finland	Asal Bargh	26	Helsinki	Europe
France	Camille René	18	Fort-de-France	Europe
Gabon	Hillary Ondo	19	Oyem	Africa
Georgia	Nino Gulikashvili	20	Tbilisi	Europe
Germany	Jackeline Dobritzsch	20	Berlin	Europe
Ghana	Gety Baffoa	21	Accra	Africa
Guadeloupe	Elodie Odadan	17	Basse-Terre	Caribbean
Guatemala	Ana Rodas	26	Guatemala City	Americas
Haiti	Manouchka Luberisse	26	Port-au-Prince	Caribbean
Honduras	Andrea López	18	Siguatepeque	Americas
Hong Kong	Sisi Wang	25	Hong Kong	Asia
Hungary	Anett Szigethy	19	Budapest	Europe
Iceland	Fanney Ingvarsdóttir	21	Mosfellsbær	Europe
India	Vijaya Sharma	21	New Delhi	Asia
Indonesia	Cokorda Istri Krisnanda Widani	21	Tabanan	Asia
Iraq	Klaodia Khalaf	20	Baghdad	Asia
Italy	Laura Piras	21	Sardinia	Europe
Jamaica	Maurita Robinson	23	Kingston	Caribbean
Kosovo	Ramela Koleci	22	Pristina	Europe
Latvia	Diana Kubasova	24	Riga	Europe
Luxembourg	Heloise Paulmier	18	Luxembourg	Europe
Macao	Sarah Leyshan	26	Macao	Asia
Malaysia	Nancy Markus	26	Kuala Lumpur	Asia
Martinique	Cindy Jolie	20	Fort-de-France	Caribbean
Mexico	Jacqueline Morales	22	Zapotlanejo	Americas
Moldova	Valeria Donu	17	Chișinău	Europe
Myanmar	Khin Wint Wah	19	Yangon	Asia
Netherlands	Leila Aigbedion	21	Heemskerk	Europe
New Zealand	Chanè Berghorst	21	Auckland	Oceania
Nicaragua	Alejandra Gross	19	Managua	Americas
Nigeria	Neri Omoregie	23	Edo	Africa
Northern Ireland	Chloe Marsden	18	Belfast	Europe
Norway	Marie Molo Peter	22	Fredrikstad	Europe
Panama	Yinnela Yero	23	Herrera	Americas
Philippines	Mutya Johanna Datul	21	Santa Maria	Asia
Poland	Angelika Ogryzek	21	Szczecin	Europe
Portugal	Bruna Monteiro	21	Bragança	Europe
Puerto Rico	Desirée Del Rio	26	San Juan	Caribbean
Réunion	Julie Nauche	25	Saint-Denis	Africa
Romania	Natalia Rus	17	Maramureș	Europe
Russia	Yana Dubnik	22	Novosibirsk	Europe
Rwanda	Aurore Mutesi Kayiranga	21	Kigali	Africa
Serbia	Tanja Cupic	20	Belgrade	Europe
Sierra Leone	Suad Dukuray	22	Freetown	Africa
Slovakia	Luciána Čvirková	20	Bratislava	Europe
South Africa	Natasha Pretorius	23	Cape Town	Africa
Spain	Eva Rogel	23	Seville	Europe
Sri Lanka	Gayesha Perera	25	Colombo	Asia
Suriname	Jaleeza Weibolt	21	Paramaribo	Caribbean
Sweden	Sally Lindgren	22	Stockholm	Europe
Switzerland	Joana Loureiro	20	Bern	Europe
Thailand	Thanyaporn Srisen	25	Bangkok	Asia
Togo	Armande Akumah	22	Lomé	Africa
Turkey	Leyla Köse	21	Nevşehir	Europe
Ukraine	Kateryna Sandulova	23	Kyiv	Europe
United States	Kristy Abreu	19	Westchester	Americas
United States Virgin Islands	Esonica Veira	24	Charlotte Amalie	Caribbean
Uruguay	Agustina Mederos	22	Montevideo	Americas
Venezuela	Annie Fuenmayor	22	Maracaibo	Americas
Wales	Fallon Robinson	18	Cardiff	Europe
Zimbabwe	Lungile Mathe	23	Harare	Africa

== Notes ==
Debut
