= Esma Voloder =

Bosnian-Australian beauty pageant titleholder

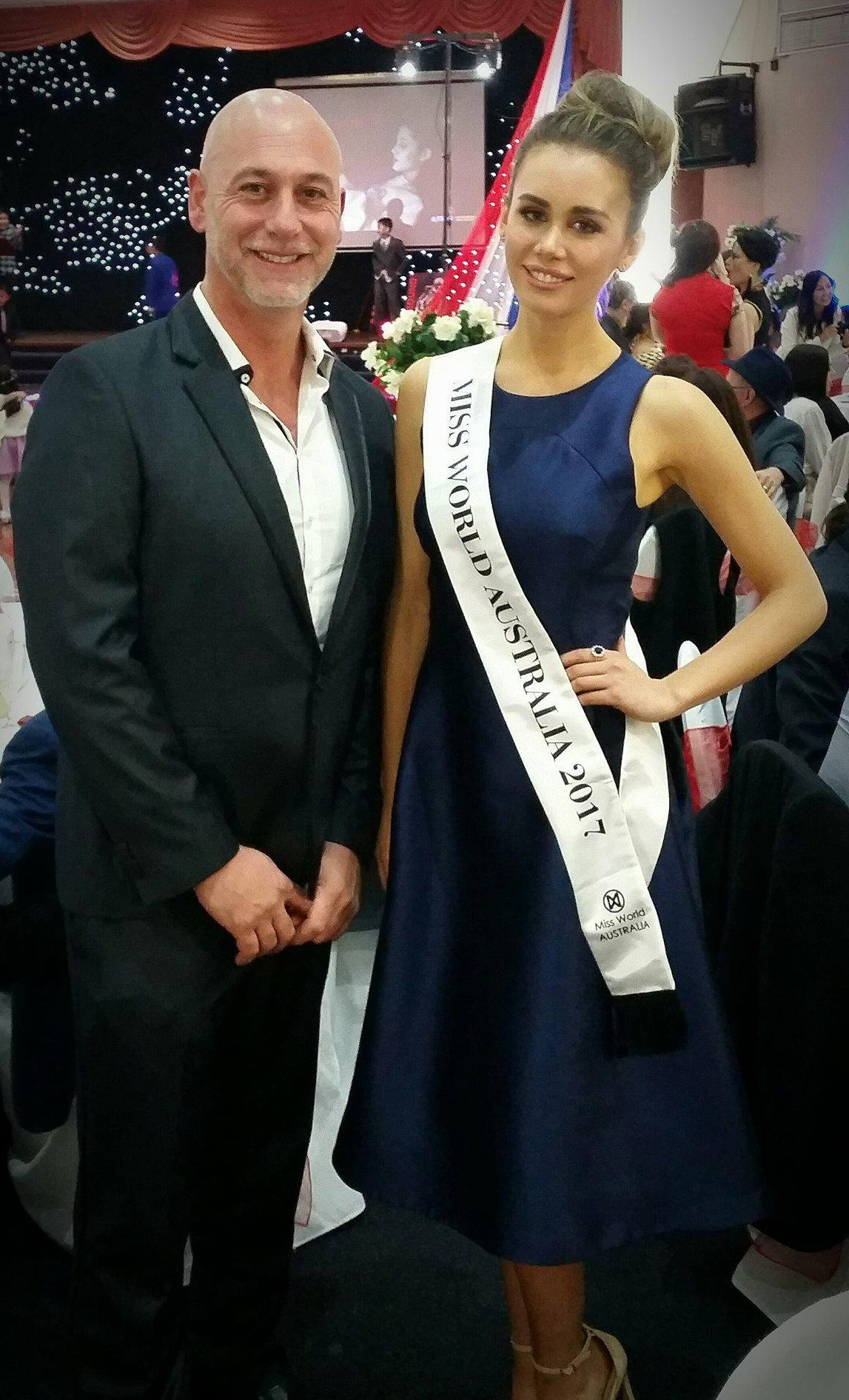
- Born: Esma Voloder
- Height: 5 ft 7 in (170 cm)
- Beauty pageant titleholder
- Title: Miss Supranational Australia 2013; Miss Globe International 2014; Miss World Australia 2017
- Hair color: Dark Blonde
- Eye color: Green
- Major competitions: Miss Supranational 2013 (Top 10); Miss Globe International 2014 (Winner); Miss World Australia 2017 (Winner); Miss World 2017 (Unplaced)

Esma Voloder is a Bosnian-Australian actress, model and beauty pageant titleholder who was crowned Miss World Australia 2017 and represented Australia at the Miss World 2017 pageant.

== Pageantry ==
=== Miss Supranational 2013 ===
Voloder represented Australia at Miss Supranational 2013 in Poland and ended up as a Top 10 semi-finalist.

=== Miss Globe International 2014 ===
Voloder has been crowned as Miss Globe International 2014 at the conclusion of the finals held on September 14, 2014, at Baku Crystal Hall, in the city of Baku, Azerbaijan.

=== Miss World Australia 2017 ===
Voloder was crowned Miss World Australia 2017 and competed at Miss World 2017 in Sanya, China, but failed to place in the semifinals, ending Australia's six-year streak of consecutive placements in Miss World, from 2011 through 2016.

== Personal life ==
Voloder was born in a refugee camp after her parents escaped the Bosnian War. The family then relocated to Australia. She has gone on to earn a degree in psychology and as of 2017, worked as a criminal profiler in Melbourne.

Voloder is a Muslim.

== Career ==
Voloder is a model, host, TV presenter, and is involved in international and Australian brand/label promotion

Awards and achievements
Preceded by (Queensland) Madeline Cowe	Miss World Australia; 2017	Succeeded by (Victoria (state)) Taylah Cannon
