= Fatou Khan =

Gambian administrator

- Born: c.1880 Njau
- Died: c.1940 Njau
- Citizenship: Gambia Colony and Protectorate
- Known for: Administering British colonial rule
- Criminal charges: Impersonation

Fatou Khan, also Fatu or Fatoo (c.1880 - c.1940) was a Gambian administrator, who was an unofficial commissioner of the Gambia Colony and Protectorate.

== Biography ==
Khan was born circa 1880 in Njau Village in the Upper Saloum District of the Gambia and was of Wolof ethnicity. Little is known of her early life, other than she married for the first time circa 1900, but divorced him ten years later. In 1910 she married according to Sharia marriage rites for a second time, on this occasion to the British Travelling Commissioner of the North Bank province, one J K McCallum. Khan taught her husband Wolof, a language for which he later wrote a grammar and dictionary. Throughout their marriage, McCallum increasingly relied on Khan to undertake his duties for him, which included collecting taxes and protecting her relatives from colonial authorities, such as her uncle, Chief Sawalo Sise. Often McCallum was reduced to signing letters that she had already drafted with the help of interpreters. He also, supposedly, taught her how to forge his signature, enabling her to have control of his affairs.

Khan was highly influential, despite being illiterate, however their inter-racial relationship ended in scandal in 1919. That year, Sawalo Sise, whom Khan had previously protected, brought charges against McCallum: that he had three wives - Fatou Khan, Fana Kumba Lowe and Fatim Mbowe; that he was not administering the district himself. He also accused Khan of using her influence to extract bribes from local farmers which were paid in grains, such as rice and coos. The Governor, Edward John Cameron, set up a committee of inquiry, which was shocked by the relationship between McCallum and Khan. This was the first recorded commission of enquiry established in colonial Gambia, and was a result of the role of a woman and her influence in colonial micro-politics. The enquiry suspended McCallum, who then retired from service with a pension of £227 per annum; Khan was fined £50 on charges of impersonation.

Khan died circa 1940 in Njau.

== Historiography ==
The life of Fatou Khan has been studied extensively by the historian Hassoum Ceesay, who demonstrates that her life can illustrate a variety of aspects of colonial Gambia: from the role of women, to literacy, to inter-racial relationships, as well as providing insight into colonial life in Gambia in the shadow of the First World War.
