= Emma Golijanin =

Bosnian beauty queen, model and actress (born 1992)

- Born: 15 April 1992 (age 33); Sarajevo, Bosnia and Herzegovina
- Occupation: Model
- Known for: Miss Bosnia and Herzegovina for Miss Earth 2010

Emma Golijanin (born 15 April 1992) is a Bosnian beauty queen, model and actress. She represented Bosnia and Herzegovina in the Miss Earth 2010 World Final held in Vietnam.
