= Jacqueline Morales =

Mexican model and beauty pageant titleholder

- Born: Jacqueline Alejandra Morales Pérez; 30 March 1991 (age 35); Zapotlanejo, Jalisco, Mexico
- Occupation: Model
- Height: 175 cm (5 ft 9 in)
- Title: Señorita Turismo Región de Los Altos 2010; Miss Supranational Mexico 2013

Jacqueline Alejandra Morales Pérez (born 30 March 1991) is a Mexican model, coach and beauty queen who represented her country in the Miss Supranational 2013 pageant in Minsk, Belarus, where she placed as first Runner-Up.

== Pageantry ==
Morales began competing in pageantry after she was selected to represent Zapotlanejo at Señorita Turismo Región de Los Altos 2010, where she emerged as the winner and became the only zapotlanejense to win the contest.

Two years later, she auditioned and competed in Nuestra belleza jalisco, which was held at Diana Theatre, Guadalajara on 19 July 2012, where she placed in the Top 5. But the thing did not stay in Jalisco: In 2013 she was announced as Miss Supranational Mexico by the former director of Miss Mexico, the late Hugo Castellanos who prepared several women from Jalisco for beauty pageants, including the Miss Universe, Ximena Navarrete, was also in charge of training Jacqueline.

As Miss Supranational Mexico 2013, Morales was the representative of Mexico at the Miss Supranational 2013. The final night was held on 6 September 2013 at Minsk, Belarus, where finished as the 1st Runner-Up, making her the first Mexican to reach the highest placement for the first time at this pageant.

Awards and achievements
Preceded by (Thailand) Nanthawan Wannachutha	Miss Supranational 1st Runner-Up; 2013	Succeeded by (Thailand) Parapadsorn Vorrasirinda
Preceded by Debut	Miss Supranational Mexico; 2013	Succeeded by (Jalisco) Natalia Sánchez Díaz
