= Sacred Heart School in Tokyo =

Private girls school in Tokyo, Japan

- 聖心女子学院初等科・中等科・高等科

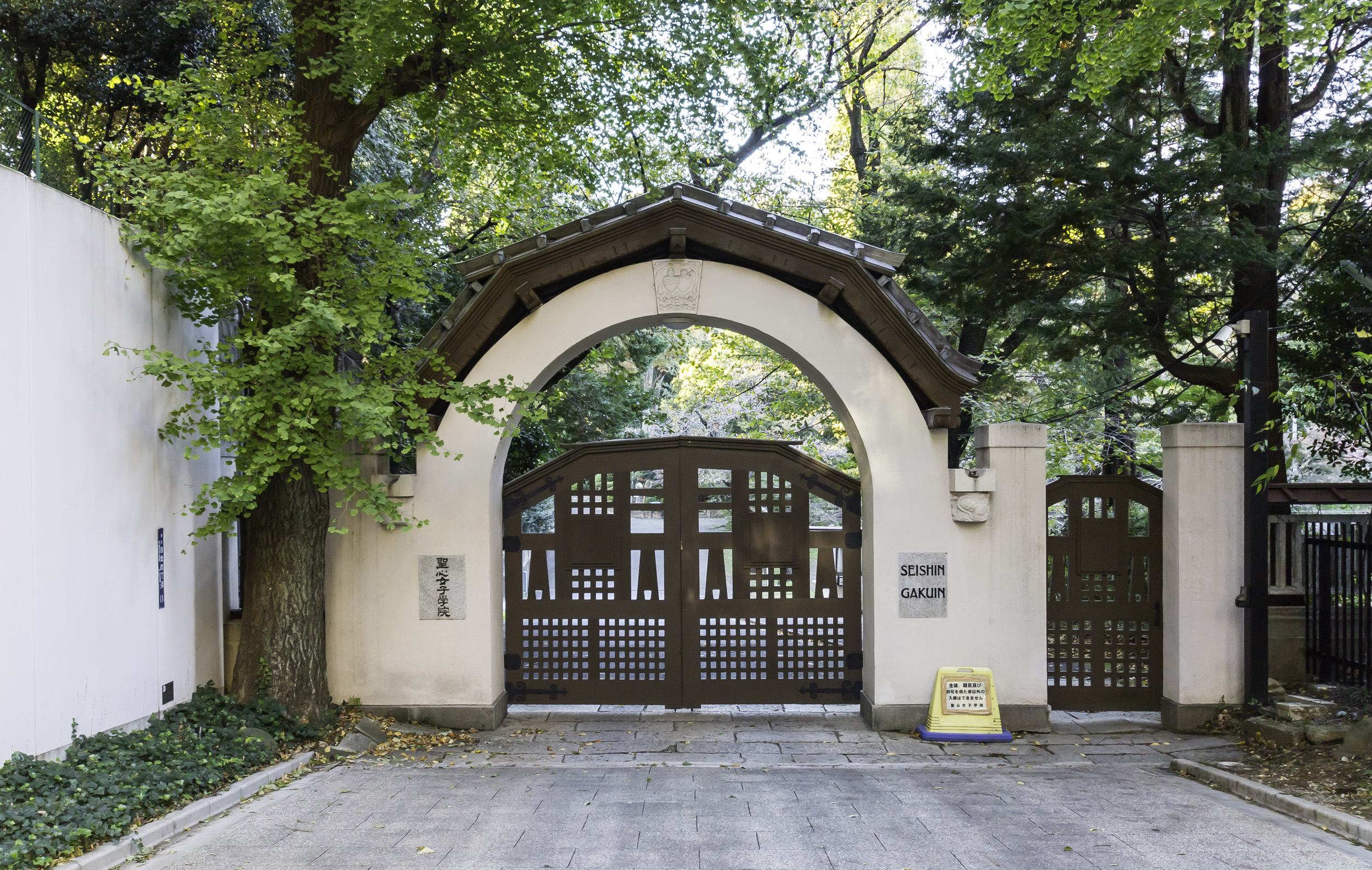
- Main gate, 2024

Location
- 4-11-1 Shirokane, Minato-ku; Tokyo, 108-0072; Japan; 35.6425°N 139.726°E

Information
- Religious affiliation: Catholicism
- Established: 1908; 118 years ago
- Website: www.tky-sacred-heart.ed.jp

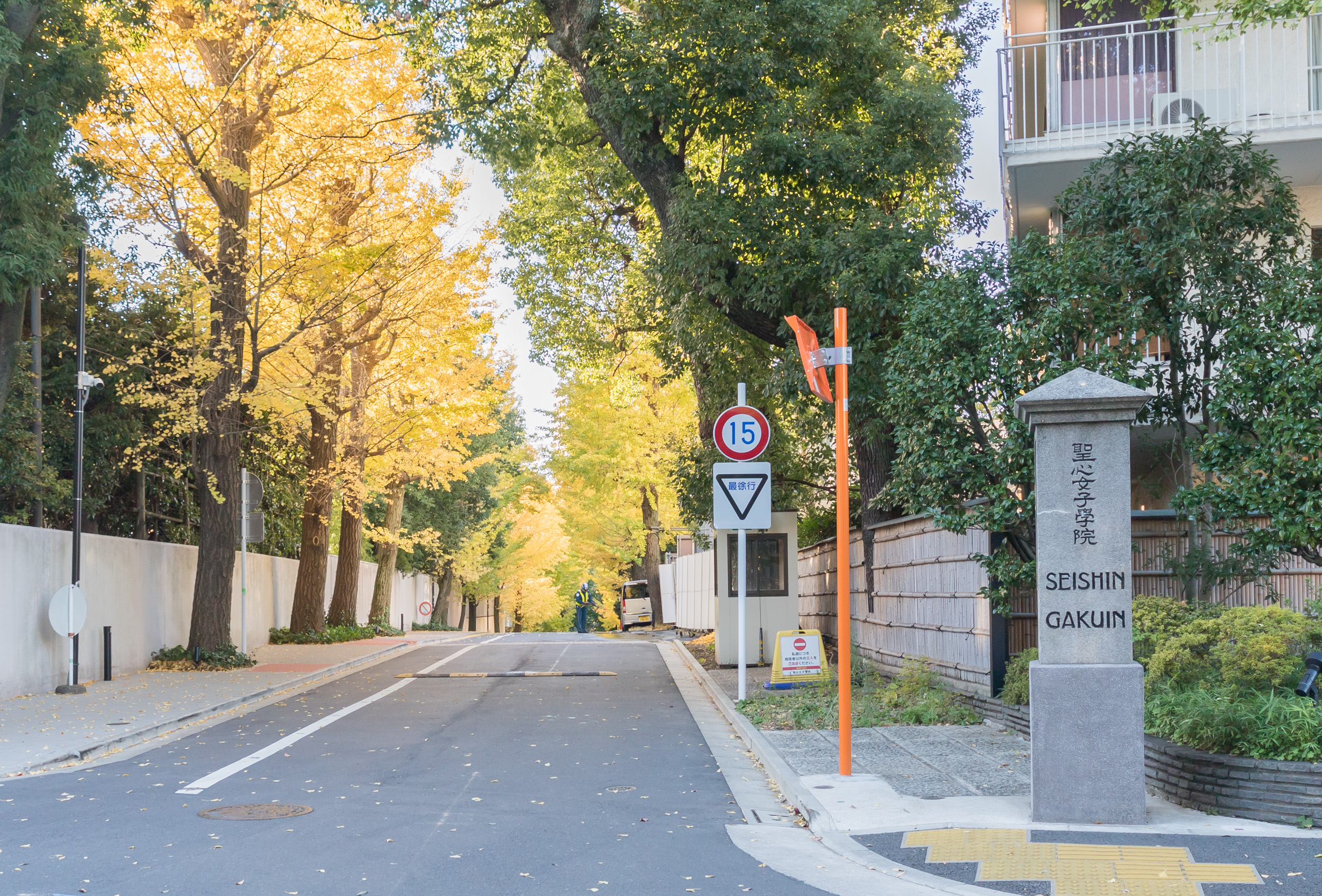
Sacred Heart School in Tokyo

Sacred Heart School in Tokyo (聖心女子学院, Seishin Joshi Gakuin) is a private school for girls in Shirokane, Minato, Tokyo. Founded in 1908, it serves grades 1–12, from elementary school through senior high school. It is a part of the Sacred Heart Schools network, affiliated with the University of the Sacred Heart in Tokyo.

== History ==
- 1910（Meiji 43） - Senior high school・Elementary school・kindergarten established
- 1947（Showa 22） - Junior high school reestablished according to Educational reform in occupied Japan
- 1948（Showa 23） - Senior high school established
- 1966（Showa 41） - Senior high school part-time curriculum established
- 1971（Showa 46） - Kindergarten closed
- 1972（Showa 47） - Two semester system established
- 1974（Showa 49） - 5 days per week system established
- 1976（Showa 51） - Senior High School part-time curriculum abolished
- 2008（Heisei 20） - 4-4-4 system established, starting from class entering elementary school this year
- 2012（Heisei 24） - Entry exam for students starting in year 5 of elementary school started.
- 2014（Heisei 26） - Junior High School entry stopped (transition to an integrated school system from Elementary to Senior High School)

== 4-4-4 System ==
From the class starting in 2008, the school transitioned to an integrated school system, dividing school years into 3 stages of 4 years each as follows.

- First stage: From first to fourth year of elementary school - focusing on fundamental education.
- Second stage: Fifth and sixth years of elementary school, and first and second years of junior high school - focusing on solidifying, mastering and expanding education.
- Third stage: Third year of junior high school and first to final year of Senior high school. - focusing on applying, developing and deepening education.

This change was motivated by wanting to distinguish fifth and sixth year elementary school students, who upon entering puberty begin to enter a different stage of development. Accordingly, these students study alongside junior high school students in the same school building.

== Religious events ==
- April - Commencement mass
- May - Feast of saint Madeleine Sophie Barat , Coronation of the Virgin
- June - Feast of the Sacred Heart
- July - Third year senior high school students silent meditation camp
- October- Feast of Mater Admirabilis, Sacred Heart festival
- November - Feast of saint Rose Philippine Duchesne
- December - Lily Procession, Christmas wishing
- February - Graduation mass
- March - Thanksgiving mass

== Clubs and circles ==
Clubs for the high school are divided into cultural clubs, sports clubs, and performance clubs. Club activities are limited to two times a week. In addition to these clubs, there are circles whose activities are typically conducted during lunch recess.

=== Cultural clubs ===
- Art club
- Physics and chemistry club
- Biology club
- Geology club
- Home economics (Senior high students only)

=== Sports clubs ===
- Tennis club
- Basketball club
- Volleyball club
- Table tennis club
- Badminton club
- Kendo club
- Swimming club

=== Performance clubs ===
- Orchestra club
- Japanese theater club
- English theater club
- Dance club
- Popular music club

=== Circles ===
- Sadou circle
- Japanese flower arrangement circle
- Choir circle
- E.S.S.
- Soccer circle
- Model United Nations circle
- Social studies circle
- Film circle
- Karuta circle
- Sign language circle
- Photography circle
- Calligraphy circle
- Art and literature circle
- Quiz circle
- Animation circle

The following are the elementary school clubs which are limited to 6th period on Monday.

=== Sports clubs ===
- Badminton club
- Basketball club
- Dance club
- Soccer club
- Softball club
- Table tennis club

=== Cultural clubs ===
- Sign language club
- Theater club
- Reading and writing club
- Computer club
- Crafts club
- Historical game club
- Chemistry club
- Art club

== Notable alumni ==
- Momoko Abe, Miss Universe Japan 2017
- Empress Michiko, Empress consort of Japan to Emperor Akihito.
- Princess Tomohito of Mikasa
- Hisako, Princess Takamado
- Yasuko Konoe (kindergarten), former member of the Imperial House of Japan
- Okamura Fuku, Catholic nun
- Mieko Kamiya, Doctor
- Kikuko Inoue, Olympic equestrian
- Hidé Ishiguro, philosopher
- Sadako Ogata, diplomat
- Ayako Sono, writer
- Maria Mori, singer and actress
- Yūko Nakagawa, politician
- Akie Abe, Japanese socialite and widow of Shinzo Abe
- Naomi Tokashiki, politician
- Kaori Ishikawa, politician
- Miyako Tanaka, swimmer
- Hitomi Kaneko, classical musician
- Rina Kitagawa, voice actress
- Mariko Oi, BBC reporter

== See also ==
- List of high schools in Tokyo
