= University of the Sacred Heart (Japan) =

Catholic women's university in Tokyo, Japan

Coordinates: 35°39′5.3″N 139°43′12.1″E

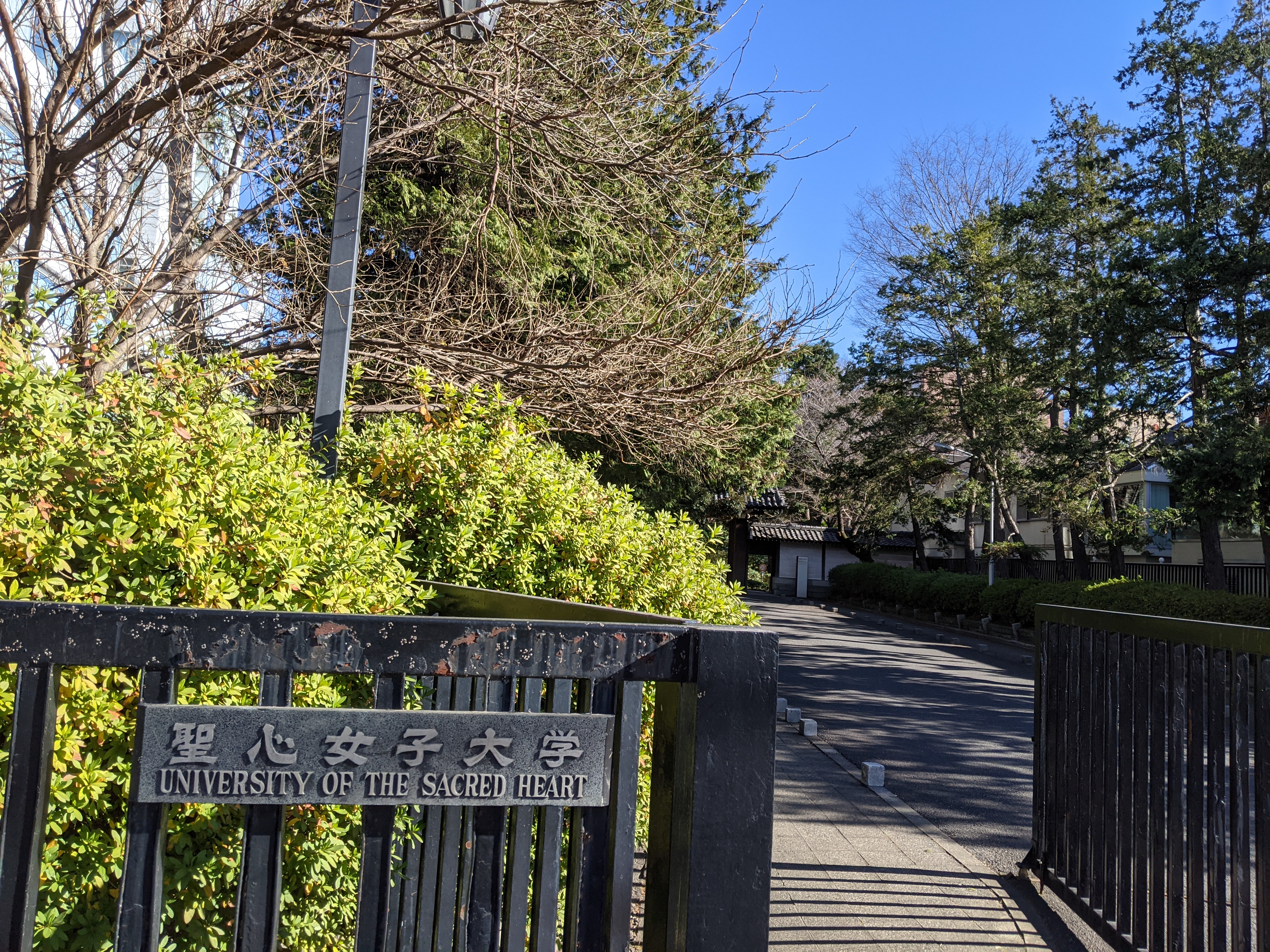
- University of the Sacred Heart
- Motto: Ubi caritas, ibi Deus
- Type: Catholic; Private
- Established: 1916/1948
- Affiliations: Society of the Sacred Heart
- Head: Kiyo Yamagata
- Faculty: 67
- Undergraduates: 2,000
- Postgraduates: 100
- Location: Shibuya, Tokyo, Japan
- Campus: Urban
- Website: www.u-sacred-heart.ac.jp

The University of the Sacred Heart (聖心女子大学, Seishin Joshi Daigaku) is a Japanese private women's university located in Hiroo, Shibuya, Tokyo.

It was established in 1916 as a special school (senmon gakkō) by the Society of the Sacred Heart, a French Roman Catholic religious order for women. It became a university in 1948 and is one of the oldest women's universities in Japan.

== Departments ==
The university has one faculty of Liberal Arts, with the following departments:

- Department of English Language and Literature
- Department of Japanese Language and Literature
- Department of History and Social Sciences
- Department of Philosophy
- Department of Education

It also has a graduate school of arts offering master's degrees and doctorates in these subjects.

== Affiliated schools ==
- Sacred Heart School in Tokyo in Shirokane, Minato, Tokyo
- International School of the Sacred Heart in Hiroo, Shibuya, Tokyo
- Sapporo Sacred Heart Junior & Senior High School in Chūō-ku, Sapporo
- Fuji Sacred Heart Junior & Senior High School in Susono, Shizuoka Prefecture
- Obayashi Sacred Heart School in Takarazuka, Hyōgo Prefecture

== Notable alumnae ==
- Eriko Yamatani, politician
- Makiko Fujino, politician
- Empress Michiko
- Sadako Ogata, scholar, former United Nations High Commissioner for Refugees
- Mariko Ōhara, author
- Ayako Sono, author
- Ikumi Yoshimatsu, Miss International 2012 (first Japanese to do so)
- Momoko Abe, Miss Universe Japan 2017

== See also ==
- Sacred Heart Professional Training College
