= Joshi (disambiguation) =

Joshi (from jyotishi) is an Indian family name.

Joshi may also refer to:

- Joshi (director), Indian filmmaker
- Joshi (wrestling), a female wrestler in Japanese professional wrestling
- Seishin Joshi Gakuin, a school
- Japanese particles or joshi

== See also ==
- Jyotisha, indian astrology
  - Jyotiḥśāstra, astrological texts
- Jyotish (caste), an Indian Brahmin subgroup, related with the surname
