= Japan–Malaysia relations =

- Japan: Malaysia

Diplomatic mission
- Embassy of Japan, Kuala Lumpur: Embassy of Malaysia, Tokyo

Japan–Malaysia relations refers to bilateral foreign relations between the two countries Japan and Malaysia. The earliest recorded historical relation between the two nations are the trade relations between the Malacca Sultanate and the Ryūkyū Kingdom in the 15th century. Small numbers of Japanese settlers migrated to various parts of present-day Malaysia throughout the 19th century. This continued well into the 20th century, until relations reached an abrupt nadir with the rise of the Empire of Japan and its subsequent invasion and occupation of British Malaya and Borneo during World War II, during which the local populace endured often brutal Japanese military rule.

Relations gradually improved after the war, culminating in Malaysia's "Look East" policy during the first premiership of Mahathir Mohamad in the 1980s.

Japan maintains an embassy in the capital city of Kuala Lumpur, a consulate-general office in George Town, Penang and a consular office in Kota Kinabalu. Malaysia has an embassy in Shibuya, Tokyo. The two countries enjoy warm diplomatic relations. According to a 2013 Pew Research Center survey, 80% of Malaysians hold a positive view of Japan and its influence, ranking Malaysia as one of the most pro-Japanese countries in the world.

Results of 2013 Pew Research Center poll Asia/Pacific views of Japan by country (sorted by fav − unfav)
Country polled	Favorable	Unfavorable	Neutral	Fav − Unfav
China	4%	90%	6	-86
South Korea	22%	77%	1	-55
Pakistan	51%	7%	42	44
Philippines	78%	18%	4	60
Australia	78%	16%	6	62
Indonesia	79%	12%	9	67
Malaysia	80%	6%	14	74

== History ==
=== Maritime trade ===
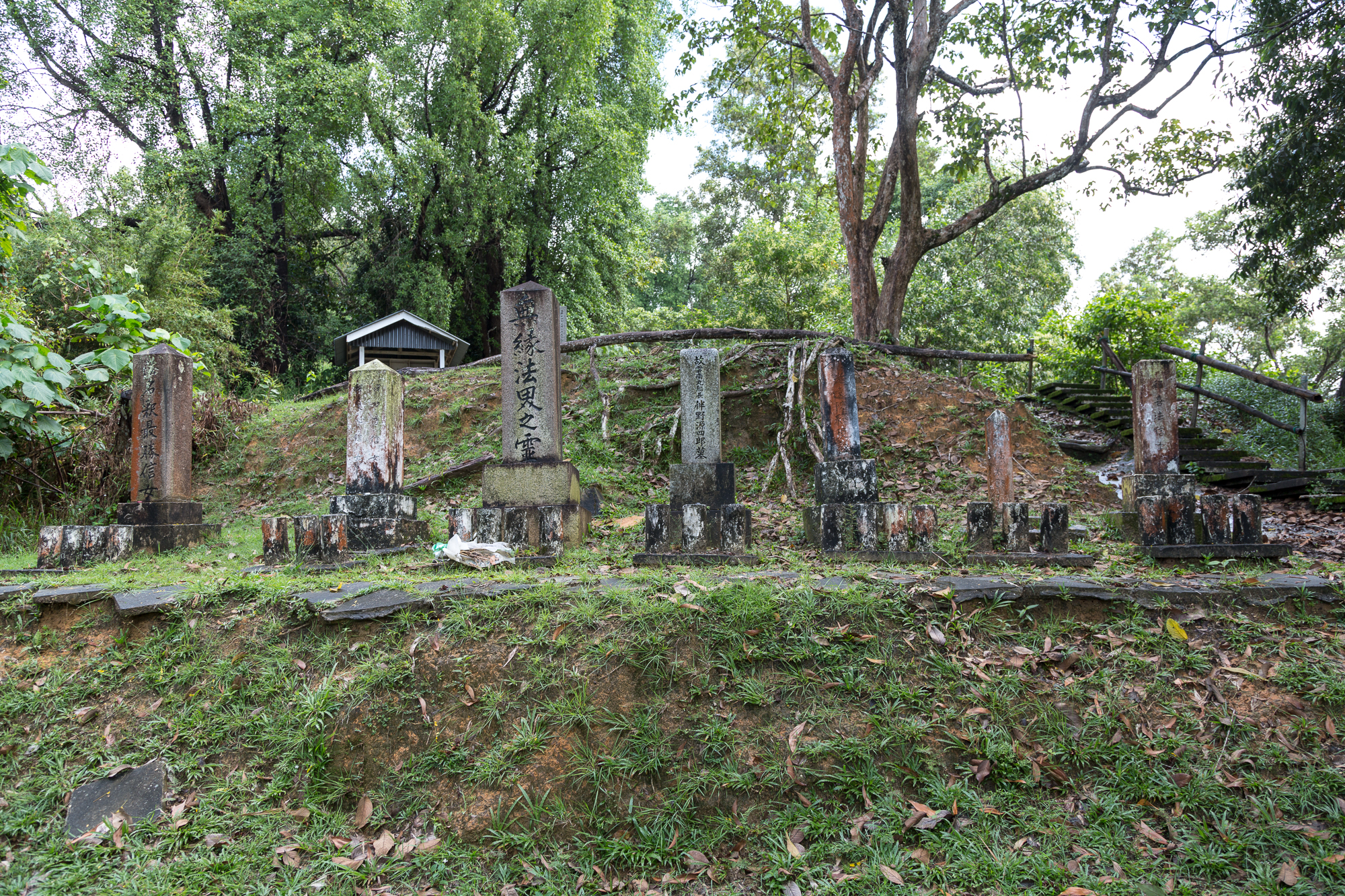
The Sandakan Japanese Cemetery site in Sandakan, Sabah, with most of the graves belonging to Japanese women, has existed since before World War II.

The Ryūkyū Kingdom held trade relations with the Malacca Sultanate in the 15th century. Its maritime trade with kingdoms in Southeast Asia included Japanese products—silver, swords, fans, lacquerware, folding screens—and Chinese products—medicinal herbs, minted coins, glazed ceramics, brocades, textiles—were traded for Southeast Asian sappanwood, rhino horn, tin, sugar, iron, ambergris, Indian ivory and Arabian frankincense. Altogether, 150 voyages between the kingdom and Southeast Asia on Ryūkyūan ships were recorded in the Rekidai Hōan, an official record of diplomatic documents compiled by the kingdom, as having taken place between 1424 and the 1630s, with 61 of them bound for Siam, 10 for Malacca, 10 for Pattani and 8 for Java, among others.

=== World War II ===
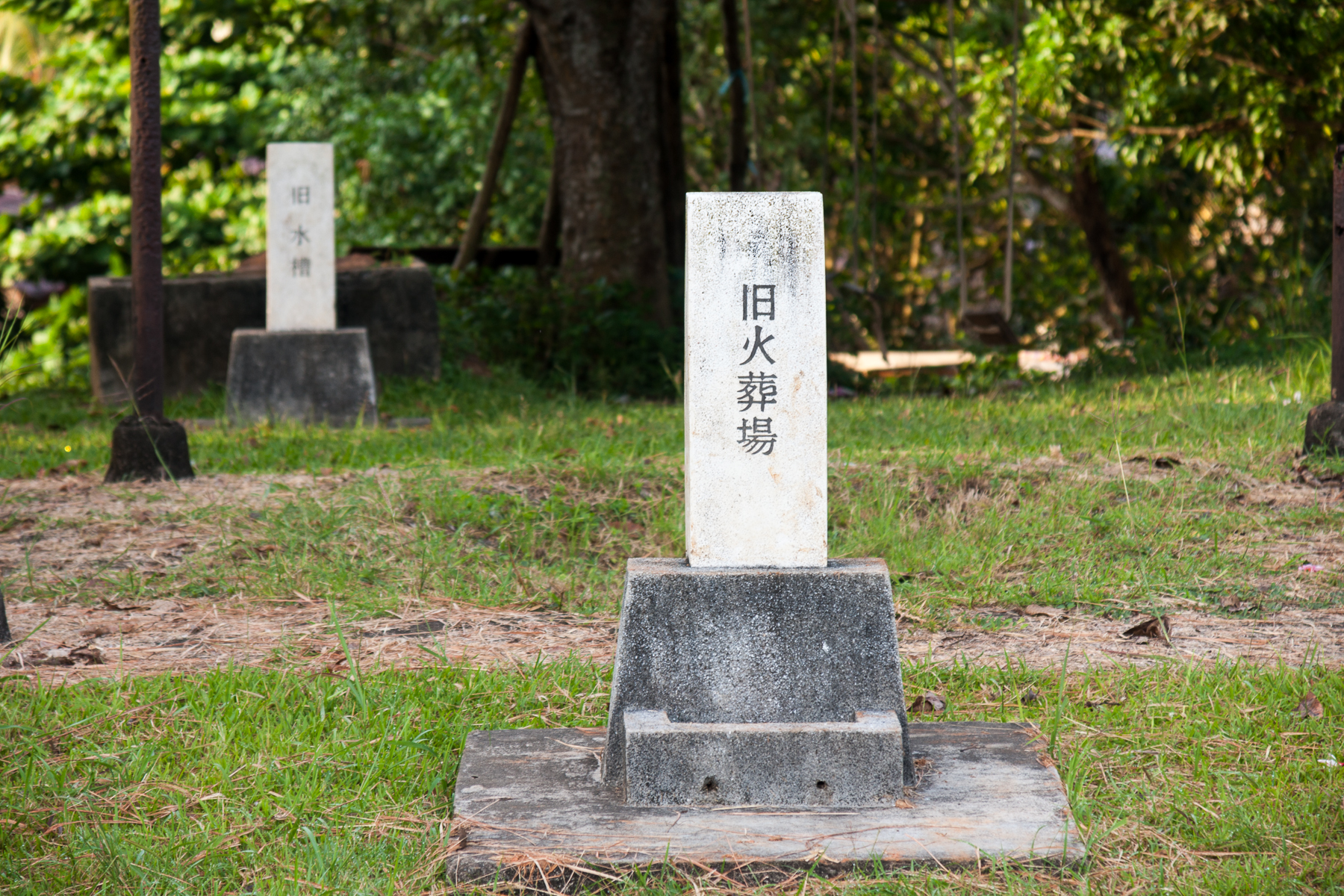
The Tawau Japanese War Memorial in Tawau, Sabah.

In the 20th century, Japan established itself as an imperial superpower and launched offensives throughout Southeast Asia, including Malaya, a British colony at the time. The Malayan Campaign from 8 December 1941 saw the Imperial Japanese Army overwhelming British and Commonwealth troops. The Japanese occupation gave rise to an anti-Japanese movement in Malaya especially within the Chinese community, fuelled by their contempt for the Japanese invasion of China, which resulted in the establishment of the Malayan Peoples' Anti-Japanese Army (MPAJA).

The movement did not find enough support from the Malays and Indians with whom the Imperial Japanese Army engaged in a propaganda of "Asia untuk Orang Asia" ("Asia for Asians"), portraying the Japanese as the locals' saviours from colonial rule. The local population found inspiration for independence from witnessing the ability of Imperial Japan to expel the Europeans from Southeast Asia. The Kesatuan Melayu Muda (Young Malay Union) worked with the Japanese to anti-colonial and anti-British sentiments in Malaysia. However, the Japanese authorities did not entertain requests for independence by the local population. Significant support for the Japanese deteriorated and the British were able to regain Malaya, Singapore as well as North Borneo at the end of World War II.

With its defeat and subsequent occupation at the hands of the United States, Japan sought to re-establish diplomatic relations with its neighbouring countries. The Malayan independence from the British on 31 August 1957 was followed by the establishment of diplomatic relations with Japan. The Japanese embassy was opened in Kuala Lumpur on 9 September 1957.

=== Look East Policy ===
The "Look East Policy" was an economic policy announced by the Prime Minister of Malaysia, Mahathir Mohamad, during the "5th Joint Annual Conference of MAJECA/JAMECA" at the Hilton Hotel, Kuala Lumpur on 8 February 1982. The policy was established as a follow-up to the "Buy British Last" policy that was also announced by the prime minister in October 1981.

The policy sought to learn from Japan and South Korea, regarded as superpowers of the East, the work ethics, practices and policies that have helped the two nations advance in various industrial and economic sectors at times much more than its Western counterparts. Students and civil servants have been sent to study courses in industrial, technical, executive and commercial sectors. Official figures have estimated as much as 15,000–16,000 Malaysian citizens benefited from the policy since the inception in 1982, and the current Malaysian government has sought to revise the policy to include green technology and biotechnology. When Mahathir returned to the prime ministership in 2019, he revived the "Look East" policy and urged more Malaysians to study in Japan while at the same time welcoming any Japanese universities headed by Japanese nationals to open up their branches in Malaysia for Malaysian students who are unable to afford the cost of living in Japan.

== Economic relations ==
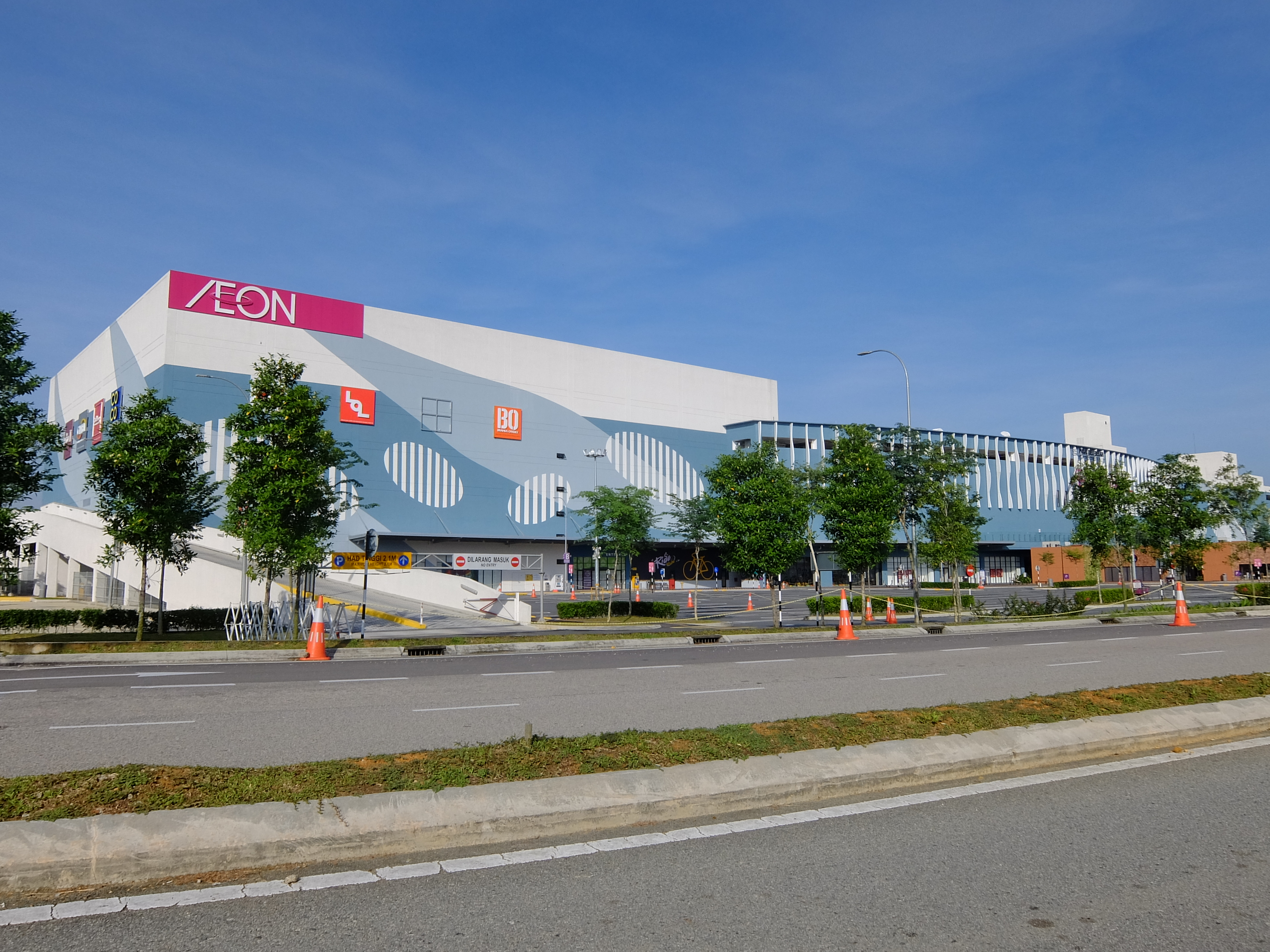
Japan's Æon Group shopping mall in Johor, Malaysia.

Total trade between Malaysia and Japan in 2011 was at RM145.3 billion with RM80 billion contributed by exports from Malaysia to Japan, while imports from Japan amounted to RM65.3 billion. There are about 1,400 Japanese companies operating in Malaysia, creating more than 11,000 job opportunities.

Japan has increased its import of liquefied natural gas to about 34%. Before 2007, the bilateral rate between both countries were at a deficit. In the halal industry, halal certification endorsement by the Malaysian government has allowed Malaysian companies in the halal food industry to compete well in the Japanese market. The building of a halal park in Japan is also considered.

In 2016, around 413,000 Japanese tourists visited Malaysia, while 394,000 Malaysian tourists visited Japan. Until 2017, there were around 1,500 Japanese companies operating in Malaysia. To encourage more Japanese companies to invest in Malaysia, Sumitomo Mitsui Banking Corporation (SIMBC) signed a memorandum of understanding (MoU) with Malaysian Investment Development Authority (MIDA) and InvestKL. On 5 May 2017, both countries concluded a currency swap arrangement of up to US$3 billion through Bank of Japan (BOJ) and Bank Negara Malaysia (BNM) to contribute to financial market stability and strengthen ties between both nations.

== Official visits ==
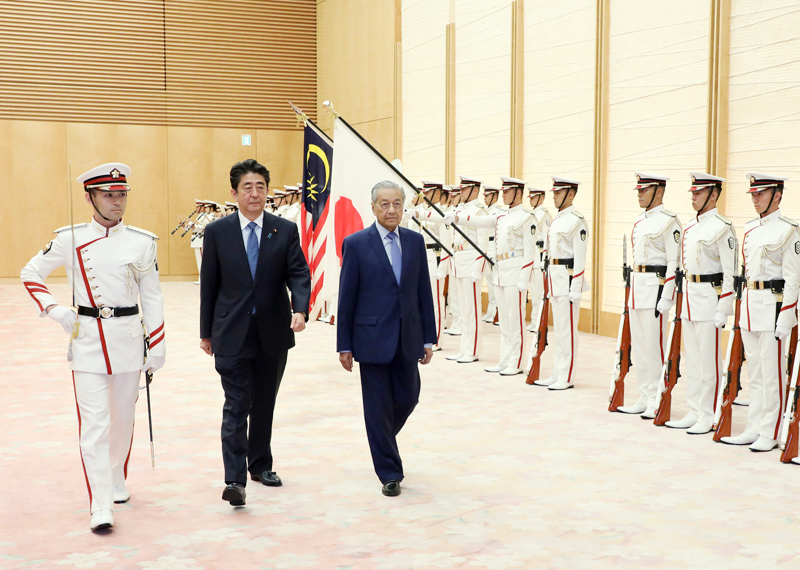
On 12 June 2018, Mahathir visited Japan, marking his first overseas trip since becoming Prime Minister for the second time

The Japanese and Malaysian governments have visited each other on multiple occasions. Notable visits include the Yang Di-Pertuan Agong (King) of Malaysia visiting Japan in 2005 while in 2006, the Emperor and Empress of Japan visited Malaysia. Both Japan and Malaysia are members of East Asia Summit, Asia-Pacific Economic Cooperation, ASEAN+3 and World Trade Organization.

== Security relations ==
In September 2016, the Japanese government, through Prime Minister Shinzō Abe, provided Malaysia free patrol boats following similar agreements with the Philippines and Vietnam. The military vessels, which were previously used by the Japan Coast Guard, were given to Malaysia to counter Chinese military activities in the waters of Malaysia. In May 2017, Japan sought to give their P-3C patrol planes to Malaysia.

== Education relations ==
In March 2023, University of Tsukuba announced the establishment of a new international campus in Malaysia, becoming the first Japanese public university to set up a campus outside of Japan.

Malaysia hosts five Nihonjin gakkō (Japanese schools) in Kuala Lumpur, Penang, Johor Bahru, Ipoh, and Kota Kinabalu – the most of any Asian country except China.

== Transport links ==
Malaysia Airlines, AirAsia X, Batik Air Malaysia, Japan Airlines and All Nippon Airways all offer direct flights between Malaysia and Japan.

== See also ==
- Foreign relations of Japan
- Foreign relations of Malaysia
- Japanese migration to Malaysia
