= Makiko Fujino =

Japanese politician (born 1949)

- 藤野 真紀子

Member of the House of Representatives
- In office 11 September 2005 – 21 July 2009
- Constituency: Tōkai PR

Personal details
- Born: 15 September 1949 (age 77) Chiyoda, Tokyo, Japan
- Party: Liberal Democratic
- Spouse: Kimitaka Fujino (m. 1973)
- Education: University of the Sacred Heart

Makiko Fujino (藤野 真紀子, Fujino Makiko; born 15 September 1949) is a Japanese politician of the Liberal Democratic Party, a member of the House of Representatives in the Diet (national legislature), representing the 4th District of Aichi Prefecture. A native of Tokyo and graduate of the University of the Sacred Heart, she was elected to the House of Representatives for the first time in 2005. Her husband is Kimitaka Fujino, a member of the House of Councilors in the Diet.

== See also ==
- Koizumi Children
