= Atsushi Ogata =

- 緒方 篤
- Born: 1962 (age 63–64)
- Education: Harvard College; Center for Advanced Visual Studies
- Occupations: Film director; screenwriter; video artist; actor
- Parents: Shijuro Ogata (father); Sadako Ogata (mother)

Atsushi Ogata (緒方 篤, Ogata Atsushi; born 1962) is a Japanese film director, scriptwriter, video artist, and actor. Born in Japan and partly raised in the United States, Ogata has worked in the Netherlands, Germany, Japan, and the US. He is a graduate of Harvard College and the Center for Advanced Visual Studies (CAVS) of the Massachusetts Institute of Technology. Ogata has received funding from ZDF German national public television and the Dutch National Film Fund for his screenplays.

His father was banker Shijuro Ogata and his mother was United Nations High Commissioner for Refugees Sadako Ogata.

Ogata's short film Eternally Yours (不老長寿, Furochōju), which he wrote, directed, and produced, was the only Japanese film to be selected for the New Directors/New Films Festival 2007 in New York at the Museum of Modern Art and the Film Society of Lincoln Center. It won the Best Short Film Award at the 2007 Bangkok International Film Festival in Thailand, the Seahorse Award Best Short Film at the Moondance International Film Festival 2007, and the Indie Soul Best Story Line Award at the Boston International Film Festival 2008. Wakiyaku Monogatari (脇役物語), his feature-film directorial debut Cast Me If You Can was released on October 23, 2010 in Japan.
