= Tokusō Saizensen =

Japanese television series

- Genre: Detective drama
- Written by: Shukei Nagasaka
- Directed by: Toshihiko Amano; Yukio Noda; Akinori Matsuo
- Starring: Hideaki Nitani; Hiroshi Fujioka; Toshiyuki Nishida; Kojiro Hongo; Hideji Ōtaki; Naoya Makoto; Atsushi Watanabe; Kenichi Sakuragi; Kiyotaka Mitsugi; Shigeru Araki; Yusuke Natsu; Yuji Abe; Katsuhiko Yokomitsu
- Narrated by: Shūichirō Moriyama (ep.1-53), Shinji Nakae (ep54-)
- Theme music composer: Chūji Kinoshita
- Ending theme: Watashi Dakeno Jyujika sung by Fausto Cigliano
- Country of origin: Japan
- Original language: Japanese
- No. of episodes: 509

Production
- Producer: Masaki Takahashi
- Running time: 45 minutes
- Production company: Toei Company

Original release
- Network: TV Asahi
- Release: April 6, 1977 – March 26, 1987

Tokusō Saizensen (特捜最前線; lit. "Special Investigation Frontline") was a long running popular television detective series in Japan, which ran from 1977 to 1987. Aired on TV Asahi. It stars Hideaki Nitani.

== Cast ==
- Hideaki Nitani as Kyosuke Kamishiro (Boss of the Special Investigation Division)
- Hiroshi Fujioka as Tetsuo Sakurai
- Shigeru Araki as Akira Tsugami
- Toshiyuki Nishida as Yozo Takasugi
- Kojiro Hongo as Tsuyoshi Tachibana
- Katsuhiko Yokomitsu as Jinichi Kubayashi
- Hideji Ōtaki as Ippei Funamura
- Naoya Makoto as Ryuji Yoshino (1977–86)
- Yusuke Natsu as Junichi Kano
- Atsushi Watanabe as Denkichi Tokita
- Kenichi Sakuragi as Jiro Taki
- Masumi Sekiya as Mikiko Takasugi
- Kiyotaka Mitsugi as Kiyoshiro Inukai
- Yuji Abe as Toshio Sugi
