= Yuumi Kato =

Japanese model and beauty pageant titleholder

- Born: Yuumi Kato; July 10, 1996 (age 30); Nagoya, Aichi, Japan
- Height: 1.72 m (5 ft 7 1/2 in)
- Beauty pageant titleholder
- Title: Miss Universe Mie 2018; Miss Universe Japan 2018
- Hair color: Black
- Eye color: Dark Brown
- Major competitions: Miss Universe Mie 2018 (Winner); Miss Universe Japan 2018 (Winner); Miss Universe 2018 (Unplaced); Miss International Japan 2022 (2nd Runner-up)

Yuumi Kato (加藤 遊海, Katō Yuumi; born 10 July 1996) is a Japanese model, actress and beauty pageant titleholder who won Miss Universe Japan 2018 and represented Japan at Miss Universe 2018.

== Personal life ==
Kato was born in Nagoya, and lived in Malaysia between the ages of five and fifteen. Her father ran a Japanese cafe in Subang Jaya, Selangor. From 2016 to 2017 she played the character Mikan in the Malay language television series Jenaka Kampung Kalut, and also worked as a brand ambassador for Isuzu Malaysia.

Kato is fluent in Japanese, Malay, Chinese, and English. She works as a model, actress and reporter.

=== Miss Universe Japan 2018 ===
On 19 March 2018 Kato was crowned as Miss Universe Japan 2018, represented Mie at Hotel Chinzanso Tokyo. She represented her country Japan at the Miss Universe 2018 held in Bangkok, Thailand on December 17, 2018. She succeeded outgoing Miss Universe Japan 2017 Momoko Abe

=== Miss Universe 2018 ===
Kato represented her country at the Miss Universe 2018 but she did not make the Top 20.

Awards and achievements
Preceded by Momoko Abe	Miss Universe Japan; 2018	Succeeded by Ako Kamo
