= Naoya Makoto =

Japanese actor

- Born: Seigo Furukawa; June 25, 1948 (age 78); Saga City Japan
- Occupation: Actor

Naoya Makoto (誠 直也, Makoto Naoya), born Seigo Furukawa (古川 誠剛, Furukawa Seigō) (born June 25, 1948) is an actor from Japan. Makoto is best known for playing the role of Tsuyoshi Kaijō / AkaRanger in Himitsu Sentai Gorenger.

== Biography ==
Naoya Makoto debuted as an actor in 1971. His first appearance was as a guest performer in the film Gendai Yakuza: Sakura Chi Sankyoudai. Over the next few years, Makoto performed in a variety of small roles. He also plays small roles in musical theater. In 1975, he starred in Himitsu Sentai Gorenger and became famous.

Makoto also has a singing career in J-pop (Japanese pop music). His world solo recording career began with the EP 'Omae no Asakusa', which was released in 1978 on the King Records label.

== Filmography ==
=== Drama ===
- Fireman (NTV, 1973), as Daisuke Misaki / Fireman
- Shounen Drama Series / Ken kaere jii (NHK, 1973)
- Eyeful Daisakusen (episode 37) (TBS, 1973)
- Ronin of the Wilderness (episode 1, serial 2) (NET, 1974), as Saku Ware
- Ōedo Sōsamō (episode 127) (Tokyo 12 Channel, 1974)
- Himitsu Sentai Gorenger (NET, 1975–1977), as Tsuyoshi Kaijō / AkaRanger
- Tokusō Saizensen (Special Investigation Front Line) (TV Asahi, 1977–1985), as Sersan Polisi Ryuji Yoshino
- Taketonbo (NTV, 1980)
- NHK Taiga drama / Shishi no Jidai (NHK, 1980), as Josuke Urakawa
- Ginga TV Shousetsu / Kemuri ga Me ni jimiru (NHK, 1981)
- Onna Kiri Insaikura (Fuji TV, 1982)
- The Suspense / Sanji: Bus Guide no Satsui (TBS, 1982)
- Deai, Meguriai (TBS, 1983)
- Yoshida Shigeru (Kansai TV, 1983)
- Hanasake Hanako 2 (NTV, 1983–1984)
- NHK Taiga drama / Haru no Hatou (NHK, 1985)
- Paula TV Shousetsu / Koi to Omelette (TBS, 1986)
- Tokusō Saizensen / (TV Asahi, 1987), as Matsu Teppou
- Edo wo Kiru VII (episode 22) (TBS, 1987), as Kichinosuke Oda
- Chushingura: Onna-tachi no Ai (TBS, 1987)
- Tenka no Goiken Ban Makaritooru! Hikozaemon Gaiki (TV Asahi, 1987)
- Saturday Wide Gekijou Kyotaro Nishimura Travel Mystery 11 (TV Asahi, 1987)
- Osato (Yomiuri TV, 1987–1988)
- Hana no Shougai: Ii Tairou to Sakuradamon (TV Tokyo, 1988)
- Drama 23 / Kamakura wo Tabi suru Onna-tachi (TBS, 1988)
- Onihei Hankachō (episode 3, serial 1) (Fuji TV, 1989)
- Hana Shinjuu (Yomiuri TV, 1990)
- Hissatsu Special: Haru, Seizoroi Shigoto Nin! Harusameja, Akunin Taiji (ABC, 1990), as Seikichi
- Minamoto no Yoshitsune (NTV, 1991)
- Daihyou Torishimariyaku Deka (episode 29) (TV Asahi, 1991)
- Gakkou ga abunai (TBS, 1992)
- Kenkaya Ukon (episode 12, serial 2) (TV Tokyo, 1993), as Shindo
- Onihei Hankachō (episode 13, serial 5) (Fuji TV, 1994), as Usui no Kamataro
- Drama 30 / Michinoku Onsen Touhikou (CBC, 1994)
- Ai to Yabou no Dokugan Ryuu: Date Masamune (TBS, 1995)
- Mou Hitotsu no Kazoku (NHK, 1995)
- NHK Taiga drama / Hachidai Shougun Yoshimune (NHK, 1995), as Takenokoshi Masatake
- NHK Taiga drama / Hideyoshi (NHK, 1996), as Ishikawa Kazumasa
- Chushingura (Fuji TV, 1996)
- NHK Taiga drama / Genroku Ryouran (NHK, 1999), as Heihachiro Kobayashi
- Okan (Yomiuri TV, 2000)
- Rouge (NHK, 2001), as Iichiro Tanigawa
- O-Edo wo Kakeru! (episode 9) (TBS, 2001), as Shinhachi Amano
- NHK Taiga drama / MUSASHI (NHK, 2003), as Todo Takatora
- Serial Kagurazaka Sho Seikatsu Anzenka (TV Tokyo, 2005 - ongoing), as Principal Nakamura
- Taxi Driver's Mystery Diary 21 (TV Asahi, 2005), as Sawa
- Keishichou Sousa Ikka 9 Kakari (TV Asahi, 2006), as Masashi Koreeda
- Aibou Season V (TV Asahi, 2006)
- Homicide Team 9 Season 2 (TV Asahi, 2007), as Masashi Koreeda
- Homicide Team 9 Season 3 (TV Asahi, 2008), as Masashi Koreeda
- Kaizoku Sentai Gokaiger (TV Asahi, 2011), as AkaRanger (Guest)
- DCU (TBS, 2022), as Daigo Noda (episode 1)
- Black Forceps (Season 2 episode 2) (2024), as Shigeno

=== Film ===
- Gendai yakuza: Chi Sakura Sankyoudai (Toei, 1971) - Saburo
- Furyou Banchou: Totsugeki Ichiban (Toei, 1971)
- Mamushi no Kyoudai: Shougai Kyoukatsu Juuhachi-Pan (Toei, 1972)
- Hito Kiri Yota: Kyouken San-Kyoudai (Toei, 1972) - Hiroshi
- Furyou Banchou: Norainu Kidoutai (Toei, 1972) - Bakudan
- Furyou Banchou: Ichimoudajin (Toei, 1972) - Sabu
- Ookami Yakuza: Soui wa Ore ga Dasu (1972) - Jiro
- Bankaku Rock (1973) - Katsu
- Andougumi Gaiden: Hito Kiri Shatei (1974) - Nakada
- Yamaguchigumi Gaiden: Kyushu Shinkou Sakusen (1974) - Hitoshi Sakai
- Shougeki! Baishun Toshi (1974) - Jiro
- Battles Without Honor and Humanity: Police Tactics (1974) - Mamoru Kaneda
- Bouryoku Machi (1974) - Takeshi
- Karajishi Keisatu (1974) - Takao Narimatsu
- Battles Without Honor and Humanity: Final Episode (1974) - Shigehisa Kanazawa
- Ninkyou Hana Ichirin (1974) - Kenta Takahara
- New Battles Without Honor and Humanity (1974) - Tadashi
- Shorinji Kempo (1975) - Hiroshi Tomoda
- Track Yarou: Goiken Muyou (1975) - Goro Iwamura
- Track Yarou: Tenka Gomen (1976) - Masakazu Izawa
- Himitsu Sentai Goranger: Hurricane Bomb (Toei, 1976) - Tsuyoshi Kaijou / AkaRanger
- Track Yarou: Otoko Ippiki Momojiro (1977) - Sakurajima
- Ougon no Inu (Shochiku, 1979) - Detektif Masuda
- Honoo no Gotoku (Toho, 1981) - Kotaro Iroha
- Onimasa (Toei, 1982) - Tetsuo Gondo
- Yamashita Shounen Monogatari (Toho-Towa, 1985) - Shiraishi Sensei
- Saigo no Bakuto (Toei, 1985) - Kiyoshi Kawafuji
- Kanashiki Hitman (1989) - Hidemasa Kishita
- Mishima: A Life in Four Chapters (1989) - Teacher of Kendo
- Bungakushou Satsujin JZiken: Ooinaru Josou (Toei Classics Film, 1989) - Detektif Tanimoto
- Watermoon (Toei, 1989) - Kenzo Hirokawa
- Gekidou no 1750-Nichi (1990) - Asari
- Uteba kagerou (1991) - Tatsuya Negishi
- Shishiou-tachi no Natsu (1991) - Zenkichi Sakakibara
- Bakusou Tracker Gundan (KSS, 1994) - Yuichiro Kimizuka
- Ningen no Tsubasa: Saigo no Catch Ball (Cinema Craft, 1996) - Tokuo Konishi
- Edisi Film Namba Kinyuu Den, Minami no Teiou PART VIII (KSS, 1996) - Kuroda
- Wakkanai Hatsu, Manabi Za (JTA Kinema Tokyo, 1999)
- Shura ga yuku 10: Hokuriku Dairi Kessen (Toei Video, 2000) - Shizuo Nakayama
- Oyabun wa Jesus-Sama (Groove Corporation, 2001) - Satoru Kabira
- Jitsuroku Hitman: Tsuma, Sono Ai (Toei, 2002) - Kakiuchi
- New Battles Without Honor and Humanity/Murder, or Another Battle/Conspiracy (Toei Video, 2003)
- Bakuryuu Sentai Abaranger DELUXE: Abare Summer Is Freezing Cold! (Toei, 2003) - Kenja Akgal
- Koudou Taichou Den: Ketdumei (KSS, 2003) - Kanji Suemori
- Jitsuroku Hitman: Hokkai no Tora, Boukyou (Toei, 2003) - Kosuke Tahata
- Cerita Shibuya (Toei, 2004) - Yamauchi
- Gokudou no Onna-tachi: Jouen (2005)
- Haru Urara (Kinema Star Film, 2005)
- Otokomae: Nihonichi no Gaka ni nattaru! (Sazanami, 2005) - Oogaki
- Fuunji: Chouja Banzuke ni Idon da Otoko (AMC, 2006)
- Yakusoku no Gogo ~OVER THE NIGHT~ (Sazanami, 2007)
- Osaka Fukei Sennyuu Sousakan (2007) - Segawa
- Gokaiger Goseiger Super Sentai 199 Hero Great Battle (Toei, 2011) - Tsuyoshi Kaijou / AkaRanger
- Saber + Zenkaiger: Super Hero Senki (2021) - Akarenger (voice)

=== Theater ===
- Shiranui onna Bushi (Shinjuku Koma Theater, 1981)
- Waraisetsu Inaka Kozo / Ora wa Tenka no Oodorobou (Meijiza, 1987)
- Hissatsu Shigotonin Nakamura Mondo Sanjou! (Umeda Koma Theater, 1988)
- W no Higeki (1993)
- Tsuki Umaya Oen ~Koi wa Miren yo Kanbotan~ (Meijiza, 1995)
- Edo no Haru: Onna Ichidai Matoi (1997)
- Naniwa Ninjou: Omoroi-Machi (Shin Kabukiza, 1999)
- Yuujou ~Akizakura no Ballade~ (2000)
- Yozakura Onana -Jinsei Gekijou- (Shin Kabukiza / Meijiza, 2001)
- The Drift 3/5: Yume no Shibahama Hanjouki (Misonoza, 2005)
- Douki no Sakura (Kudan Kaikan, 2006)

== Discography ==
EP

- Omae no Asakusa (おまえの浅草) (King Records, 1978)
- Yukimushi (雪虫) (Teichiku, 1980)
- Sapporo City Light '87 (札幌 City Light '87) (1987)...with Ritsuko Abe
