= Shijuro Ogata =

Japanese banker

- 緒方 四十郎
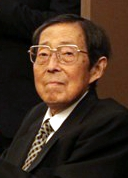
- Ogata in 2013

Director of the Development Bank of Japan
- In office 1981–1991

Personal details
- Born: 16 November 1927 Tokyo, Japan
- Died: 14 April 2014 (aged 86) Tokyo, Japan
- Spouse: Sadako Ogata (m. 1960)
- Children: Two; including Atsushi Ogata
- Education: Fletcher School at Tufts University
- Occupation: Banker

Shijuro Ogata (緒方 四十郎, Ogata Shijuro; 16 November 1927 – 14 April 2014) was a Japanese banker. He served as Director and as Vice President of the Development Bank of Japan. He was married to United Nations diplomat Sadako Ogata.

== Career ==
In 1971 was appointed branch manager of the Okayama branch office of the national bank. During the Nixon shock in August of the same year, he served as general manager of the General Affairs Division of the Foreign Bureau, dealing with a confusing market. Later, after serving as Deputy Director of the Foreign Bureau. In 1975, he moved to New York City.

In 1979, he assumed the position of Director at the Foreign Bank of the Bank of Japan. In 1981, he was appointed as a director of the Bank of Japan and oversaw international relations.

In 1991, Ogata retired. Upon his retirement, he served as a board of director to Yamaichi Securities and Fuji Xerox. He also co-chaired the United Nations Financial Advisory Committee.

== Personal life ==
In 1960, Ogata married Sadako Nakamura. They had one son, Atsushi Ogata, and one daughter.

He was born in Tokyo. His father was Taketora Ogata.

Ogata died on 14 April 2014 in Tokyo of heart failure at the age of 86.

== Written works ==
- "Circle and the Bank of Japan - Central Banker of reminiscence" Chuokoronsha < Chuko Shinsho >, 1996 . ISBN 412101331X
- "Haruka Showa-Father, Takekata Ogata and I", Asahi Shimbun, 2005 . ISBN 4022579749
