= Yuji Abe =

Japanese television reporter and actor

- 阿部 祐二
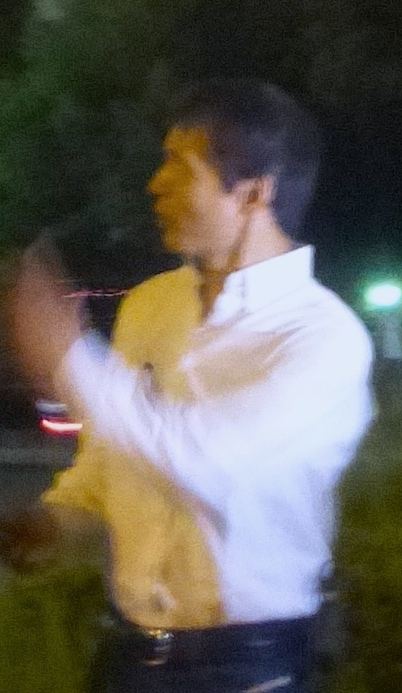
- 2015
- Born: 14 August 1958 (age 68); Itabashi, Tokyo, Japan
- Other name: Yuji Date
- Citizenship: Japan
- Occupations: Actor; TV reporter
- Years active: 1983–
- Agent: Tender Pro
- Height: 185 cm (6 ft 1 in)
- Spouse: Masako Isomura
- Children: Momoko Abe (daughter)

Yuji Abe (阿部 祐二, Abe Yūji; born 14 August 1958) is a Japanese television reporter and actor. He is represented by Tender Pro.

== Biography ==
He was born in Itabashi, Tokyo. He graduated from Yayoi Elementary School, Daiichi Junior High School, Koishikawa High School, and Waseda University Faculty of Political Science and Economics. His height is 185 cm (6 ft 1 in). His wife is professional golfer Masako Abe (maiden name: Isomura). Their eldest daughter Momoko Abe was selected as Miss Universe Japan in 2017 while working as a fashion model and tarento (celebrity). He currently lives in Urayasu, Chiba Prefecture.

He started his career as an actor in 1983 in the television drama Fukei-san wa Majo (Tokyo Broadcasting System) under the stage name Yuji Date (伊達 祐二, Date Yūji), which he used during his early years as an actor. After appearing on the magazine Popeye as a model and acting in television dramas for around a decade, he turned to reporting starting with Big Morning (TBS).

== Filmography ==
=== Modelling ===
Title	Publisher
Popeye	Magazine House

=== Films ===
Year	Title	Role	Distributor	Notes
	Baajin Road	Classroom teacher		Lead role. Unreleased in theatres. Later on at the late-night frame of TBS.
	Gotoshi Kabushiki Gaisha: Akutoku Hallo Buttsubuse!	Secretary in charge of National Assembly policy	Pal Entertainment's Production	
	Gotoshi Kabushiki Gaisha III	Driver	Pal Entertainment's Production	
	Godzilla: Tokyo S.O.S.	Yokosuka's reporter		
	Boku no Hatsukoi o Kimi ni Sasagu	Teacher Ito		
	Brooklyn Bridge o watatte	Saki Onodera's father		
	Bitter Coffee Life			
	Neon Chō: Dai Ni-maku			
	Yagyuu Jūbee Yonaoshi Tabi			Narration
1992	A mine field.	Chachai		
2009	Gokusen: The Movie	Reporter		
2012	Ace Attorney	Shingo Otoro		
2021	I'll Be Your Ears			
2023	Maku wo Orosuna!			

=== TV dramas ===
Date	Title	Role	Network	Notes
1983	Fukei-san wa Majo	Keiji Sakashita	TBS	
24 Nov 1983	Mokuyō Golden Drama Hiren	Tsutomu	YTV	
1984	Furyō Shōjo to Yobarete	Keitaro Tanba	TBS	
1985	Thirteen Boy		TBS	
1985–87	Tokusō Saizensen	Inspector Toshio Sugi	EX	
16 Aug 1987	Abunai Deka		NTV	Episode 45 "Kinshin"
9 Dec 1987	Bay City Deka	Nagai	EX	Episode 10 "Shōnan Dai Sōsa-sen! Kiken na Onna"
28 Oct 1988	Motto Abunai Deka		NTV	Episode 4 "Kisaku"
1988	New Town Kari Bunsho	Police investigator Hiroshi Nomoto	EX	
12 Nov 1989	Gorilla Keishichō Sōsa Dai 8 Han		EX	Episode 28 "Aru Shōjo no Giwaku"
8 Dec 1989	Katte ni shiyagare Hay! Brother	Yokota	NTV	Episode 9
12 Dec 1989	Nerawa rete		NTV	
9 Jan 1990	Kayō Super Wide Hakodate no Onna		EX	
18 May 1990	Keiji Kizoku	Shigaki	NTV	Episode 4 "Sono Toki, Yajū ni Kiba o Muita"
Jul–Sep 1990	Geinō Shakai		TBS	
27 Oct 1990	Kamikōchi ni Kieta Onna		EX	
2 Nov 1990	Ōedo Sōsamō: Jun Hashizume Han		TV Tokyo	Phase 1 Episode 4 "Yamaotoko ni Daka reta Onna"
15 May 1991	Hagure Keiji Junjōha	Mitsuo Kubo	EX	4th Series Episode 7 "Tōrima!? Nerawa reta Akai Kōto no Onna"
26 Oct 1991	Hakkōdasan Satsujin Boshoku	Goro Hiraoka	EX	
14 Nov 1991	Yonimo Kimyōna Monogatari		CX	"Mujin Kantai"
12 May 1992	Oretachi Rookie Cop		TBS	Episode 5 "Dai Dassen"
1992–93	Special Rescue Exceedraft	Iwao Daimon	EX	
5 Jun 1992	Keiji Kizoku 3		NTV	Episode 6 "Yogoreta Kao no Tenshi"
11 Aug 1992	Bengoshi Kenosuke Asahita 4: Kōkogaku Kyōshitsu no Satsujin		NTV	
21 Feb 1994	TBS Drama Special Genkotsu Oshō wa Mei Tantei	Tajima	TBS	
25 Jun 1994	Notohantō Onna-tachi no Satsujin Fūkei	Keiji Aoki	EX	
30 Jun 2009	MW: Dai 0-shō: Akuma no Game	Mysterious man	NTV	
3 Oct 2009	Hidarime Tantei Eye	Reporter	NTV	Single Special
13 Mar 2010	Hidarime Tantei Eye	Reporter	NTV	Final Episode
16 Mar 2010	Seicho Matsumoto Drama Special Kiri no Hata	TV reporter	NTV	
1 Jan 2015	Time Scoop Hunter Special: Oshōgatsu Panic! Kaireki Ōsōdō	Himself	NHK G	
9 Jan 2016	Special Drama Keiji Ballerino	TV reporter	NTV	
11 Mar 2016	Tensai Bakabon	Himself	NTV	

=== Informational programmes ===
Title	Network	Notes
Big Morning	TBS	Reporter
Fresh!	TBS	Reporter
Look Look Konnichiwa		Reporter
Let's!		Reporter
The! Jōhō Tsū		Reporter
Sukkiri!!		Reporter
The Tsuiseki Scoop Gekijō		Reporter
Wide na Show	CX	Wide na information

=== Variety ===
Title	Network	Notes
Monday Late Show	NTV	Reporter

=== Anime ===
Date	Title	Role	Network	Notes
Aug 2012	Himitsu no Akko-chan	Himself	NTV	Short film version

=== Advertisements ===
Year	Product
2009	Tsutaya Discas
2010	Kobayashi Pharmaceutical "Toilet Sono Ato ni"
2016	Mister Donut

=== Japanese dub ===
Year	Title	Role	Voice dub for	Notes
2009	Angels & Demons	American reporter	Steve Kehela	

=== Music videos ===
Artist	Song	Notes
Dr.Metal Factory	"Jupiter"	Also appeared in the jacket photograph of "Kava-meta Now" and "Kava-meta Then" of the same song
ET King	"mother"	

=== Direct-to-video ===
Year	Title
2013	Cosplay Tantei

=== Radio ===
Title	Network
Tokyo Remix Zoku	J-Wave

== Bibliography ==
Date	Title	Publisher	ISBN
25 Feb 2012	"Kyōsai-ka" ga Seikō suru 22 no Hōsoku	Kodansha	ISBN 978-4062174121
