= Jyotish (caste) =

The Jyotish caste comprises individuals who traditionally practiced astrology. According to many sources, these individuals were originally considered part of the Brahmin caste. They were said to have originated from Shakadweepa or Sakaldweep, and hence were referred to as Sakaldweepiya or Shakadweepi Brahmans. Upon entering India, most of them settled in Northern India, although one group migrated to Odisha in the Eastern part of India.

They were well versed in Astrology and also did Vedic rituals, teaching, and practicing Ayurvedic treatments. However, with the advancement of scientific research, their significance diminished. As a result, the later generations lost the know-how of their ancestors and therefore lost their incomes. Their poor financial state made them socially weak and backward.

However, in many places in Odisha, these people still practice Vedic rituals and serve as temple worshipers. Yet, in the undivided Puri district, their economic and social status is very low. While in other parts of India, the people practicing astrology are known as Panditji or Brahmans, in Odisha, they are struggling to regain their lost pride. They are Brahmins of Shakadweep and are now trying to get their social status back.

== Social Status ==
They are classified as an Other Backward Class (OBC), according to the system of reservation or affirmative action in India.
