= Momoko Abe =

Miss Universe Japan 2017

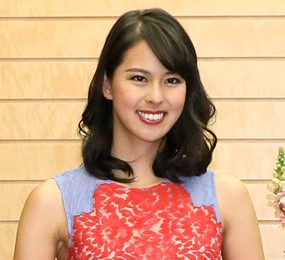
- Born: 17 September 1994 (age 32); Urayasu, Chiba, Japan
- Beauty pageant titleholder
- Title: Miss Universe Japan 2017
- Hair color: Black
- Eye color: Brown
- Major competitions: Miss Universe Japan 2017 (Winner); Miss Universe 2017 (Unplaced) (Best National Costume)

Momoko Abe (阿部 桃子, Abe Momoko; born 17 September 1994) is a Japanese actress, model and beauty pageant titleholder who was crowned Miss Universe Japan 2017 and represented Japan at Miss Universe 2017.

== Life and career ==
Abe was born in Chiba Prefecture in Japan. Her mother is a professional golf player. Her father is the television reporter Yuji Abe. Since childhood she learned how to play golf, piano, swimming and ballet. She speaks English and Japanese fluently, and studied philosophy at the University of the Sacred Heart (Japan) in Tokyo.

=== Miss Universe Japan 2017 ===
On 4 July 2017, Abe was crowned Miss Universe Japan 2017. Abe was crowned the winner by outgoing titleholder Sari Nakazawa.

=== Miss Universe 2017 ===
Abe represented Japan at Miss Universe 2017 and won the Best national costume award.

Awards and achievements
Preceded by Sari Nakazawa	Miss Universe Japan; 2017	Succeeded by Yuumi Kato
