= Kimitaka Fujino =

Japanese politician (1948–2026)

- 藤野公孝
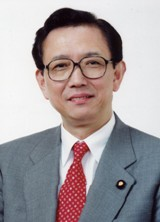
- Fujino in 2006

Member of the House of Councillors
- In office 26 November 2003 – 28 July 2007
- Constituency: proportional representation

Personal details
- Born: 29 May 1948 Saeki District, Allied-occupied Japan
- Died: 9 July 2026 (aged 78) Yokohama, Japan
- Party: LDP
- Education: Faculty of Economics, University of Tokyo
- Occupation: Civil servant

Kimitaka Fujino (Japanese: 藤野公孝 Fujino Kimitaka; 29 May 1948 – 9 July 2026) was a Japanese politician. A member of the Liberal Democratic Party, he served in the House of Councillors from 2003 to 2007.

Fujino died in Yokohama on 9 July 2026, at the age of 78.
