= Tawau Japanese War Memorial =

- タワウ戦争記念館; Tugu Peringatan Perang Jepun Tawau
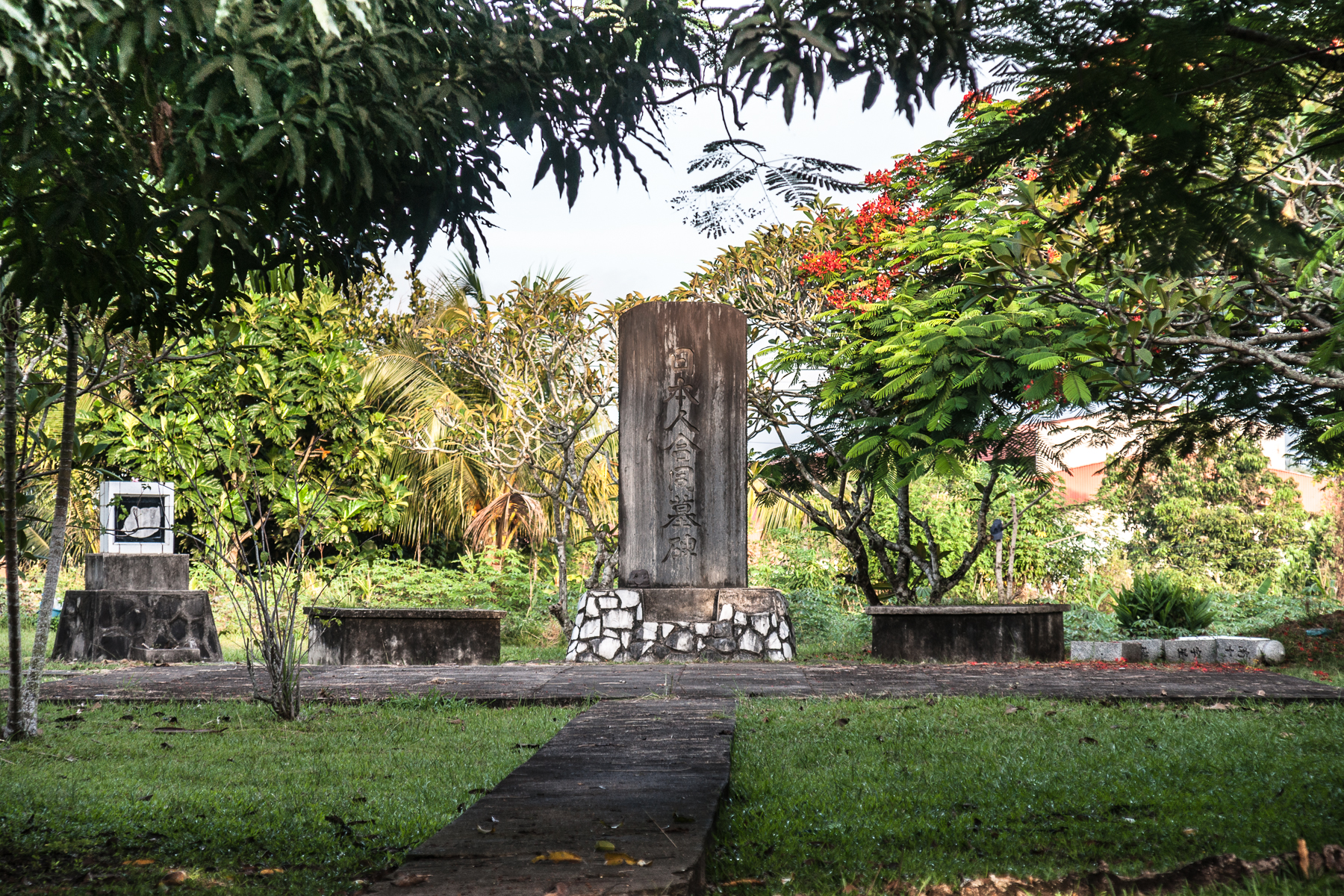
- The memorial site
- Interactive map of Tawau Japanese War Memorial
- Location: Tawau
- Coordinates: 4°16′01″N 117°52′41″E
- Dedicated to: Japanese residents in Tawau

Tawau Japanese War Memorial (Japanese: タワウ戦争記念館; Malay: Tugu Peringatan Perang Jepun Tawau) is a former Japanese cemetery in Tawau in the Malaysian state of Sabah which has been transformed into a memorial.

== History ==
After the Anglo-Japanese Treaty of 1902, many Japanese businessmen began to settle in the surrounding area of Tawau. On 19 January 1916, the Japanese Nippon Industrial Company bought 240 acres for rubber plantations and another 607 hectares of adjacent land. The plantation, known as "Kuhara Estate of Rubber and Manila Hemp," was established under the name of the owner, Fusanosuke Kuhara. Another Japanese plantation, known as "Kubota Estate," belonged to Kubota Umeme, was specialised in coconut and had operated since 1916. According to 1921 statistics, 191 Japanese resided in Tawau, and before the outbreak of the Second World War, there were 1,175.

The growing number of Japanese caused the cemetery to be built before the Second World War, and it was used by the Japanese community as a burial site. The vast majority of the people buried here died before the Second World War.

== Location ==
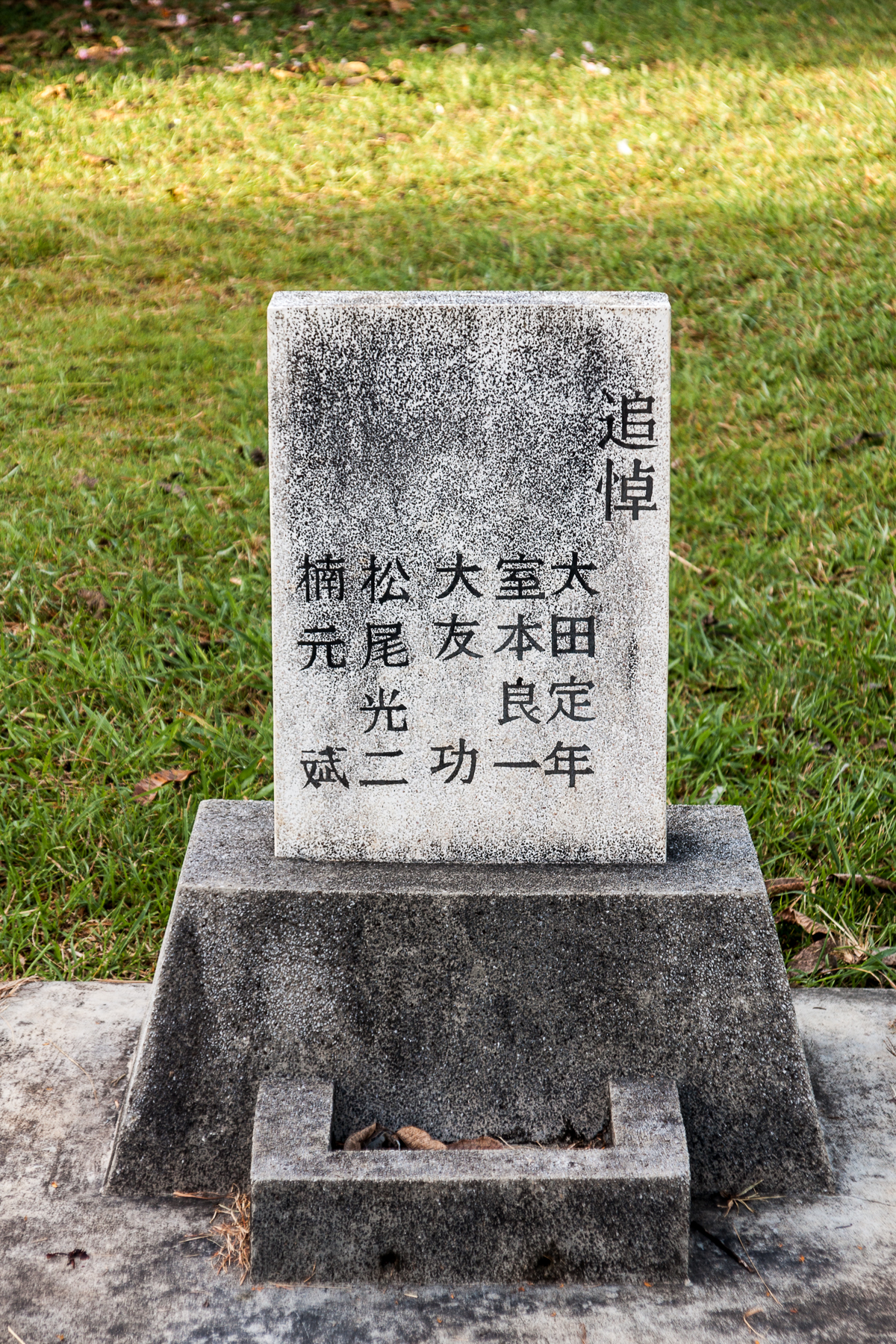
The grave stone with five Japanese names

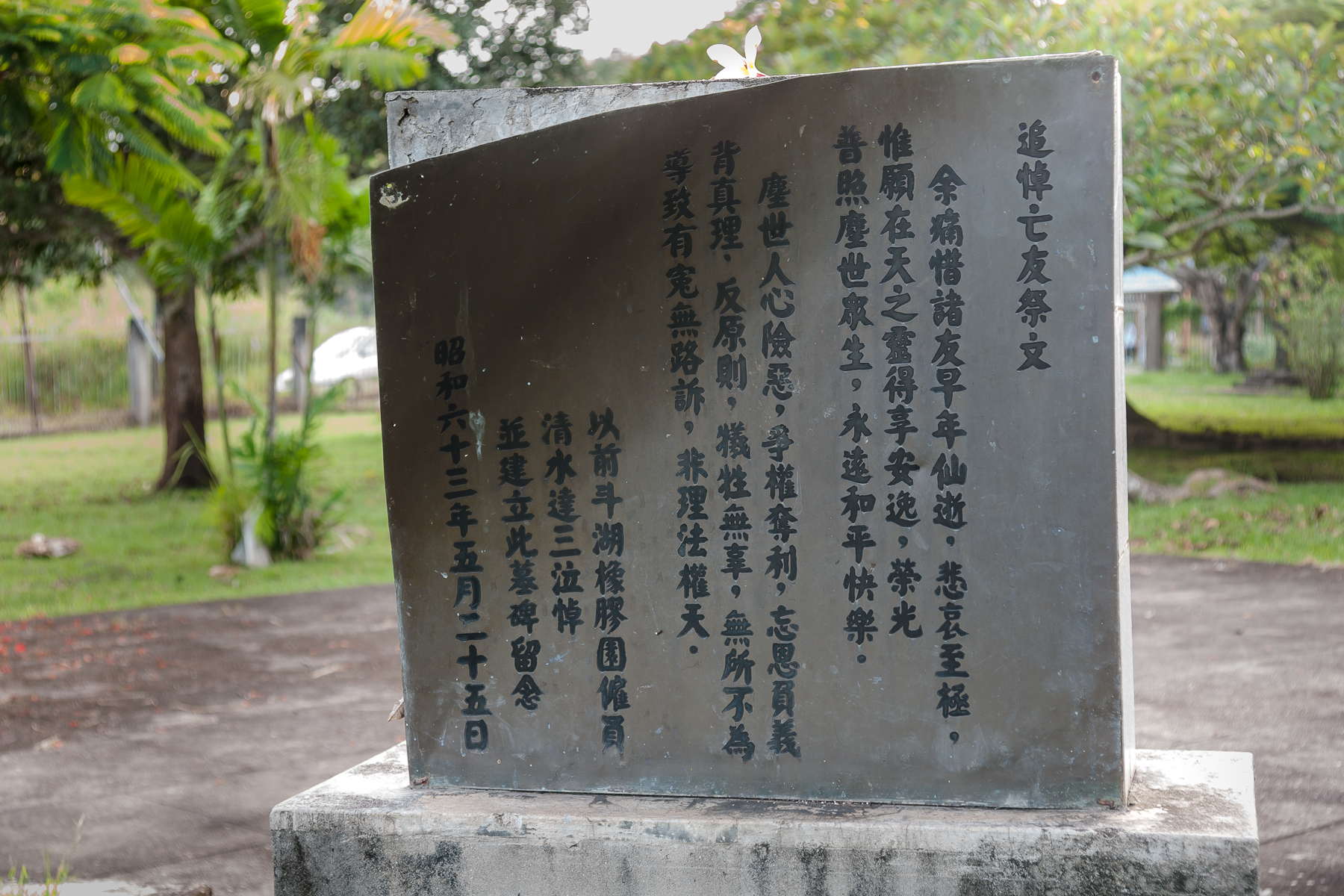
Japanese characters in the back of one of the monument, dated 25 May 1988

This site is located on the road of Tanjung Batu Street, west of Tawau Golf Course. The site is fenced on three sides. Only a few relics recall its original function as a cemetery. One of the graves listed five Japanese names, such as Sadatoshi Ohta, Ryoichi Muromoto, Isao Ohtomo, Koji Matsuo, and Takeshi Kusumoto.

On the back of one of the monuments built after the Second World War, several rows of Japanese characters can be seen, whose translation is as follows:

MOURNING THE DECEASED
I regret that some of our friends have died so young.
It is very sad.
I just hope that you enjoy the afterlife.
And your holy light over radiates to us the living, peaceful, and happy forever.
The hearts of the people in this world are threatening.
And they fight for power and profit, and they are ungrateful and not truly directed against the principles, victims of the innocent, terror at nothing.
So that nothing can be done against the injustices suffered.
It is a lawless society.
Former Tawau Rubber Estate employee Shimuzu Tatsuzo mourned with tears and built this grave stone commemorating the 63 years of the reign of Emperor Shōwa on 25 May.
