= Sadako Ogata =

Japanese diplomat (1927–2019)

Her Excellency Sadako Ogata
- 緒方 貞子
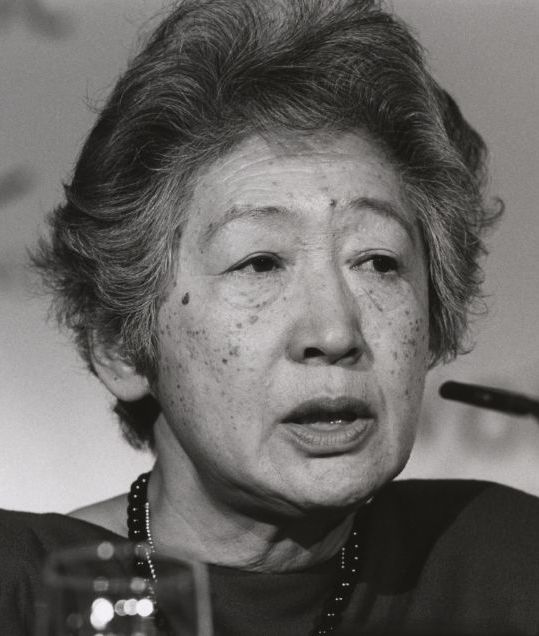
- Ogata in 1993

President of the Japan International Cooperation Agency
- In office 1 October 2003 – 30 March 2012
- Preceded by: Position established
- Succeeded by: Akihiko Tanaka

United Nations High Commissioner for Refugees
- In office 3 November 1990 – 31 December 2000
- Preceded by: Thorvald Stoltenberg
- Succeeded by: Ruud Lubbers

President of the United Nations International Children's Emergency Fund
- In office 1978–1979
- Preceded by: Ferdinand Oyono
- Succeeded by: Zaki Hasan

Personal details
- Born: 中村 貞子 (Nakamura Sadako); 16 September 1927 Azabu, Tokyo City, Tokyo Prefecture, Japan (present day Minato, Tokyo, Japan)
- Died: 22 October 2019 (aged 92) Tokyo, Japan
- Spouse: Shijuro Ogata (m. 1960; died 2014)
- Children: Two; including Atsushi Ogata
- Education: University of the Sacred Heart; Georgetown University; University of California, Berkeley

Sadako Ogata, née Nakamura (緒方 貞子, Ogata Sadako; 16 September 1927 – 22 October 2019), was a Japanese academic, diplomat, author, administrator, and professor emerita at the Roman Catholic Sophia University. She was widely known as the head of the office of the United Nations High Commissioner for Refugees (UNHCR) from 1991 to 2000, as well as in her capacities as Chair of the UNICEF Executive Board from 1978 to 1979 and as President of the Japan International Cooperation Agency (JICA) from 2003 to 2012. She also served as Advisor of the Executive Committee of the Japan Model United Nations (JMUN).

== Early and academic life ==
She was born on 16 September 1927 to a career diplomat father Toyoichi Nakamura (who became in 1943 the Japanese ambassador to Finland) and her maiden name was Sadako Nakamura. Her mother was a daughter of Foreign Minister Kenkichi Yoshizawa and granddaughter of Prime Minister Inukai Tsuyoshi, who was assassinated when she was four years old, due to his opposition to Japanese militarism, whose assassination marked the end of civilian control over the Japanese military until after World War II.

She was born in Tokyo, Japan and, due to her father's profession, she lived in the U.S. (she attended the Catlin Gabel School in Portland) from 4 to 8 years old, also lived in China from 8 to 10 during the Japanese occupation when her father was Japanese consul in Guangzhou and Hong Kong before the family went back to Japan. She stayed in Japan during World War II and after the war, she graduated from the University of the Sacred Heart in Tokyo (she majored in English Literature). Although it was not common for a Japanese woman to study abroad at that time, she entered the Edmund A. Walsh School of Foreign Service at Georgetown University, earning a master's degree in International Relations. She wanted to study the reason why Japan entered a reckless aggression war, which was not put a brake on after the assassination of her great-grandfather, Prime Minister Inukai Tsuyoshi. She was awarded a PhD in Political Science from the University of California, Berkeley in 1963, after she completed a dissertation on the politics behind the foundation of Manchukuo. The study analyzed the causes of the Japanese invasion of China. As for her personal life, in 1960 she married Shijuro Ogata and her name changed from Sadako Nakamura to Sadako Ogata. In 1965, she became Lecturer at International Christian University in Tokyo. After 1980, she taught international politics at Sophia University in Tokyo as a professor and later became Dean of the Faculty of Foreign Studies until her departure to join the UNHCR in 1991.

== Career ==
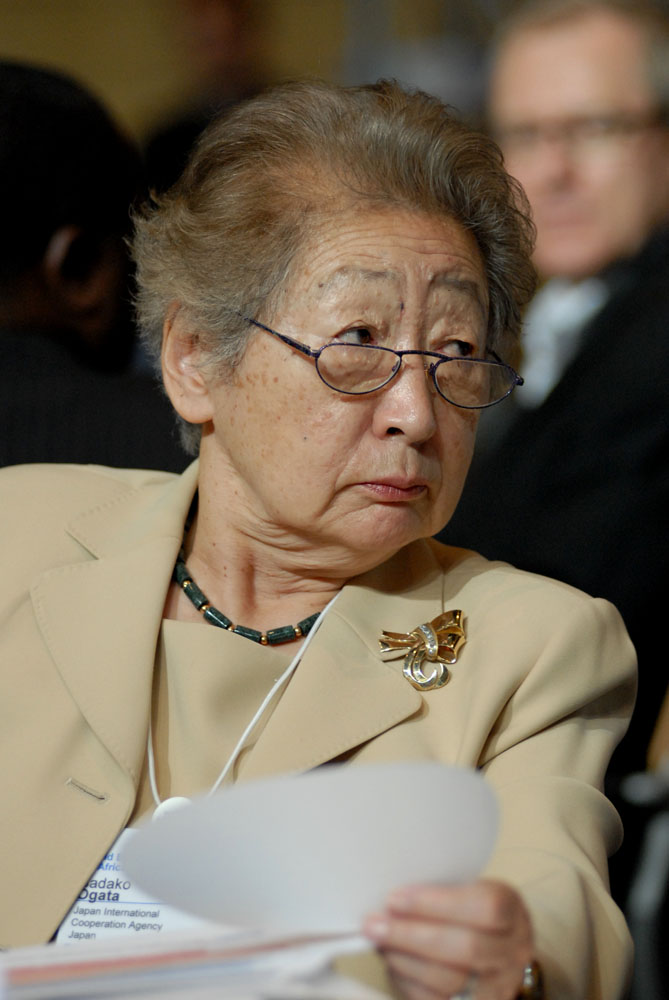
Ogata at the World Economic Forum on Africa, Cape Town, South Africa, on 4 June 2008

=== United Nations / United Nations High Commissioner for Refugees ===
Ogata was appointed to Japan's UN mission in 1968, on the recommendation of Fusae Ichikawa, a female member of the House of Councillors of Japan, who was an activist of the women's suffrage in Japan since the 1920s and had a high opinion of Ogata's character & ability. Ogata represented Japan at several sessions of the UN General Assembly in 1970. In addition, she served from 1978 to 1979 as Envoy Extraordinary and Minister Plenipotentiary for the permanent mission of Japan to the UN, and as Chair of the UNICEF Executive Board.

In 1990, she was appointed as head of the United Nations High Commissioner for Refugees (UNHCR). She was the first woman to be appointed as a head of the UNHCR. She left Sophia University to start her new position at UNHCR. Her presumed term at UNHCR was only three years, which was the remaining term of her predecessor who had left after only one year, but she continued to be assigned. She was re-elected twice (in November 1993 and in September 1998), and served, over a decade, until 2001.

As head of the UNHCR, she implemented effective strategies and helped countless refugees escape from despair, including Kurdish refugees after the Gulf War, refugees in the Yugoslav Wars, refugees in the Rwandan genocide, and Afghan refugees including victims of Cold War. In the face of Kurdish refugees at the border between Turkey and Iraq, Ogata expanded the mandate of UNHCR to include the protection of internally displaced persons (IDPs). She was a practical leader who deployed military forces in the humanitarian operations, for example at the siege of Sarajevo, the Airlift Operations in cooperation with some European air forces during the Bosnian War. During the period, the budget and the staff in UNHCR more than doubled.

Her formidable negotiating skills and petite stature earned her the sobriquet of "diminutive giant."

After UNHCR leader, in 2001, she became co-chairperson of UN Human Security Commission.

=== RET International ===
In December 2000, and coinciding with the end of her second term at the High Commission at UNHCR, as well as the 50th anniversary of the agency, Ogata announced the launch of RET International in Geneva, Switzerland. Ogata’s vision for RET was to bridge a massive gap she had witnessed during her tenure as the head of the UN Refugee Agency, specifically in education for youth.

The organization, whose initials stood for Refugee Education Trust, would be devoted to secondary education for refugees as Ogata saw this as a critical gap in need of a solution. She believed that if adolescents and youth are not given any opportunities, they will become extremely vulnerable to illegal activities, gangs, underage labor, drug trafficking, sexual abuse, sex trafficking, and violence. RET, therefore, would aim to provide them with the skills to confront these threats, develop their resilience to become self-reliant.

At inception, RET worked exclusively in refugee camps using education as a tool. However, as refugee migration patterns changed and new crises emerged, the paradigm shifted in different parts of the world and the organization developed methods specifically for refugee camps, proved to be adaptable to young people in fragile environments in general.

As of 2025, the organization remains headquartered in Geneva operates in 15 countries around the world. It has worked directly with a number of UN agencies over the years, including UNHCR, as well as governments, and private foundations to provide opportunities to vulnerable communities.

=== Japanese government / JICA President ===
In 2001, after the September 11 attacks, she was appointed as Special Representative of Prime Minister of Japan on Reconstruction Assistance to Afghanistan.

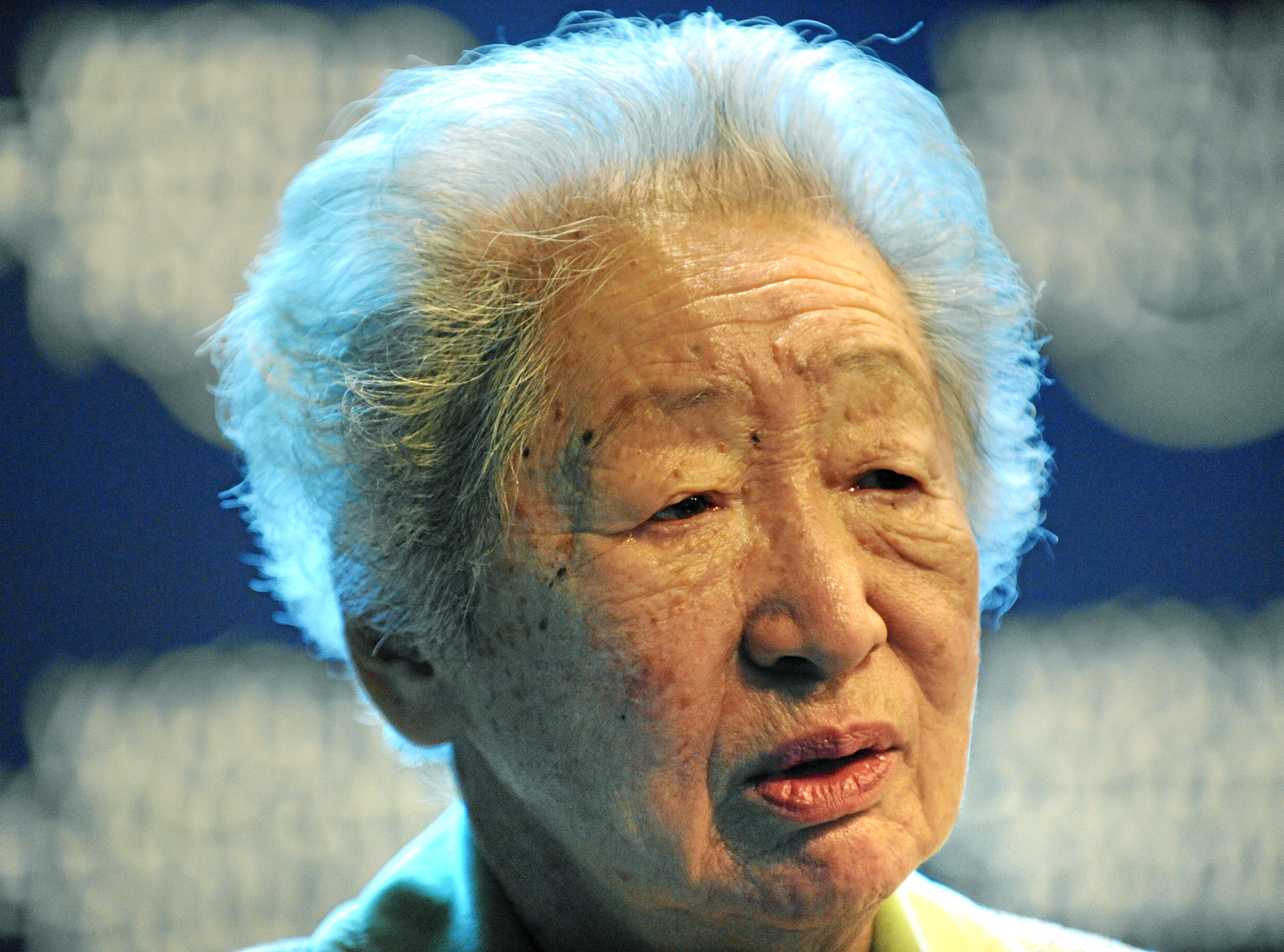
Ogata in 2012

The Koizumi government approached Ogata as a candidate to replace Makiko Tanaka as Japanese foreign minister in early 2002, but Ogata refused to accept the position. Although Ogata did not publicly explain her refusal, Kuniko Inoguchi told The New York Times that Ogata "would hate to be used as a token or a figurehead because she has fought all her life for the condition of women, and she wouldn't help someone who would try to use her for their political purposes."

Next year, going back to Tokyo, the Japanese government appointed her as President of the Japan International Cooperation Agency (JICA) on 1 October 2003. It was reported that young JICA officials expressed their strong desire for her leadership, even before the formal appointment. She led JICA with her emphasis on ideas from fields and Human Security. She built up peace-building projects on Afghanistan and Mindanao. By adding loan assistance, under her leadership JICA became the world-largest bi-laterial aid organization in 2008. She continued to work as president of JICA for more than two terms (over eight years), retiring in April 2012 to be succeeded by Akihiko Tanaka.

She was a member of The Advisory Council on the Imperial House Law on 27 November 2014. The council was Junichiro Koizumi then-Prime Minister's private advisory organ which belonged to the Cabinet Office. The council met 17 times from 25 January 2005 to discuss the Japanese succession controversy and the Imperial Household Act. On 24 November 2005, The Advisory Council's recommendation included female members' right to the throne including the right to be extended to the female lineage, and extension of the primogeniture to female members of the imperial household. Both Ogata and Empress Michiko's alma mater is the University of the Sacred Heart.

A "Reception for Respecting Mrs. Sadako Ogata's Contributions to Our Country and the International Community" was held by Kōichirō Genba, Minister for Foreign Affairs on 17 April 2012, in Tokyo. Prime Minister Yoshihiko Noda gave a speech. He said "Because of the 2011 Tōhoku earthquake and tsunami, the offers of assistance to Japan from more than 160 countries and more than 40 international organizations were NOT irrelevant to Mrs. Sadako Ogata's achievements".

Ogata was involved in the Sergio Vieira de Mello Foundation.

== Honors ==
=== Japanese decorations ===
- 2001 Person of Cultural Merit
- 2003 Order of Culture

=== Other ===
- 1993 Journalistic prize Golden Doves for Peace issued by the Italian Research Institute Archivio Disarmo
- 1994 Prize For Freedom by the Liberal International
- 1995 Liberty Medal
- 1995 Member of the American Philosophical Society
- 1997 Ramon Magsaysay Award
- 2000 Seoul Peace Prize
- 2001 Order of Friendship of Russia
- 2001 Commander's Cross of the Order of Merit of the Federal Republic of Germany Commander Crosse
- 2001 Commander of the Légion d'honneur
- 2001 Knight Grand Cross of the Order of Merit of the Italian Republic
- 2001 Commander First Class of the Order of the Polar Star of Sweden
- 2001 Indira Gandhi Prizehttps://www.officialgazette.gov.ph/featured/filipino-recipients-of-japanese-decorations-and-japanese-recipients-of-philippine-decorations/
- 2002 Fulbright Prize for International Understanding
- 2002 Honorary Doctor of Human Letters from Brown University.
- 2005 World Citizenship Award
- 2006 Grand Officer (Maringal na Pinuno) of the Order of Lakandula of the Philippines
- 2008 Grand Officer of the Order of Orange-Nassau of the Netherlands
- 2011 Honorary Dame Commander of the Order of St. Michael and St. George (DCMG)
- 2011 Medal of the Friendship of Nations (Danaker Medal) of Kyrgyzstan
- 2011 Hessian Peace Prize
- 2013 Band of the Order of the Aztec Eagle of Mexico
- 2013 Grand Cross of the Order of Sikatuna, Rank of Datu
- 2017 Humanitarian Medal Mother Teresa of Kosovo
- 2019, In 2019, Time created 89 new covers to celebrate women of the year starting from 1920; it chose Ogata for 1995.

== Quotes ==
- "If we ignore the plight of the refugees or the burden of the countries which have received them, I fear we will pay a heavy toll in renewed violence. Conditions must be created urgently to allow the refugees to go back and live in peace and tolerance in their own country." — Liberty Medal acceptance speech, 4 July 1995

== Personal life ==
In 1960, she married Shijuro Ogata (1927–2014), a son of Taketora Ogata, who was also an official of the Bank of Japan and later became its executive director. After the marriage, she changed her name from Sadako Nakamura to Sadako Ogata. She has one son (Atsushi Ogata, a film director) and one daughter. Ogata died on 22 October 2019 at the age of 92.

== Family tree ==
Tsuyoshi Inukai
Misao	Kenkichi Yoshizawa
Tsuneko	Toyoichi Nakamura	Taketora Ogata
Sadako Ogata	Shijūrō Ogata
Atsushi Ogata

== Notes ==
Diplomatic posts
Preceded by Thorvald Stoltenberg	United Nations High Commissioner for Refugees; 1991–2000	Succeeded by Ruud Lubbers
