= Sari Nakazawa =

Japanese model

- Born: July 13, 1993 (age 33); Ōtsu, Shiga, Japan
- Height: 171 cm (5 ft 7 1/2 in)
- Beauty pageant titleholder
- Title: Miss Universe Japan 2016
- Hair color: Black
- Eye color: Black
- Major competitions: Miss Universe Japan 2016 (Winner); Miss Universe 2016 (Unplaced)

Sari Nakazawa (中沢沙理, Nakazawa Sari; born July 13, 1993) is a Japanese model and beauty pageant titleholder who was crowned Miss Universe Japan 2016 and represented Japan in Miss Universe 2016.

== Early life ==
Nakazawa worked as a model in Japan.

== Pageantry ==
=== Miss Shiga 2016 ===
Nakazawa was crowned Miss Shiga 2016 and became eligible to compete at the Miss Universe Japan pageant in 2016.

=== Miss Universe Japan 2016 ===
Nakazawa was crowned Miss Universe Japan representing Shiga on March 1, 2016. She represented Japan at the Miss Universe 2016 pageant. Sayaka Matsumoto was titled first runner-up, Kaori Arike the second runner-up, Mako Sato the third runner-up, and Yukari Shiotsuki finished as the fourth runner-up.

=== Miss Universe 2016 ===
Nakazawa competed at Miss Universe 2016 but did not place.

Awards and achievements
Preceded by Ariana Miyamoto	Miss Universe Japan; 2016	Succeeded by Momoko Abe
