= Shirokane =

Shirokane 白金
- District
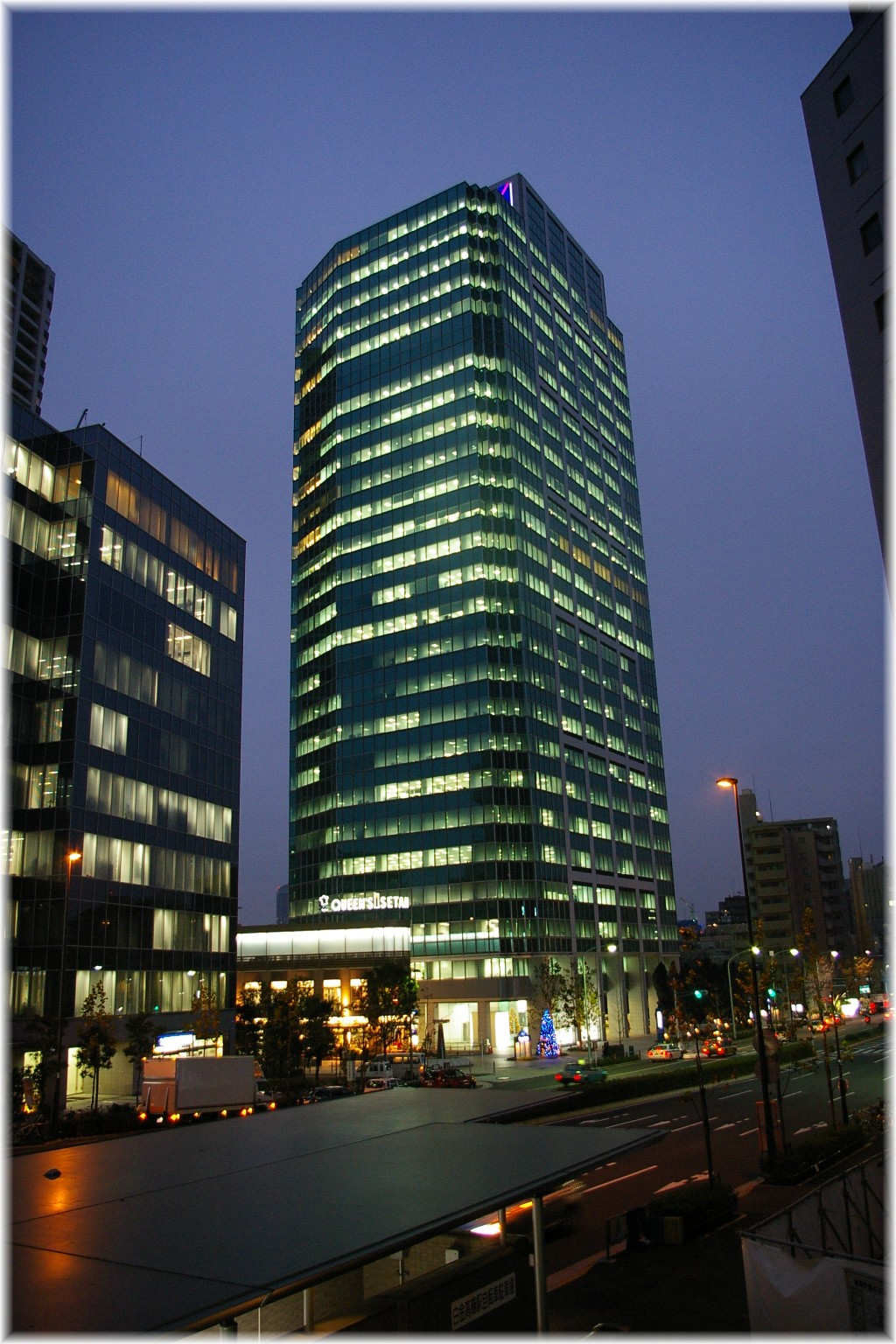
- Shirogane
- Interactive map of Shirokane
- Coordinates: 35.642868°N 139.734158°E
- Country: Japan
- City: Tokyo
- Ward: Minato
- Area: Takanawa Area

Population (April 1, 2025)
  - Total: 19,929
- Time zone: UTC+9 (JST)
- Postal code: 108-0072
- Area code: 03

Shirokane (白金) is a district of Minato, Tokyo, Japan. Currently it consists of six chōme. According to Minato, as of November 1, 2007, the population in the neighborhood is 19,929. The term Shirokane narrowly refers to Shirokane 1-chōme to Shirokane 6-chōme, but is sometimes used to include the larger neighborhood formerly known as Shiba-Shirokane (芝白金), which encompasses part of Shirokanedai and Takanawa as well as Shirokane. This article deals with the place in the narrow definition.

== Overview ==
Shirokane is located in the southwestern part of Minato, Tokyo and one of the wealthiest neighborhoods in Japan. It is a quiet residential area that is abundant in undeveloped green space. This area is known for having the most expensive real estate fees for living in Japan. Shirokane borders the neighborhoods of Minami-Azabu, Shirokanedai, Takanawa and Ebisu. The Prefectural Highway 305 (Ebisu-dori) divides Shirokane into odd-numbered (1, 3, 5-chōmes) and even-numbered (2, 4, 6-chōmes) subdistricts designated as industrial and high-rise residential areas, respectively. Small factories and shopping streets are developed along Furukawa river, and upon the southern hill a quiet residential area is developed with apartments and schools such as Seishin Joshi Gakuin. The recent opening of a subway allowed the area centered at Shirokane-Takanawa Station to undergo a large redevelopment.

There are forest areas owned by academic institutions and private companies such as Seishin Joshi Gakuin and the Kitasato Institute. With the Institute for Nature Study and the Institute of Medical Science in Shirokanedai, these areas form one of the largest green districts in the special wards of Tokyo. This large green area dates back to daimyō's mansions which existed in Edo period; later, industrialists made their residences in this place, which gave rise to the well-known upper-class neighborhood.

== Etymology ==
During the Ōei era (1394–1428), a government official of the Southern Dynasty who settled here became wealthy. His nickname was Shirokane Chōja (白金長者), which means "man who possesses much 'white gold' " (白金), a reference to silver. Thus the name of this location is the "Silver District".

== Education ==
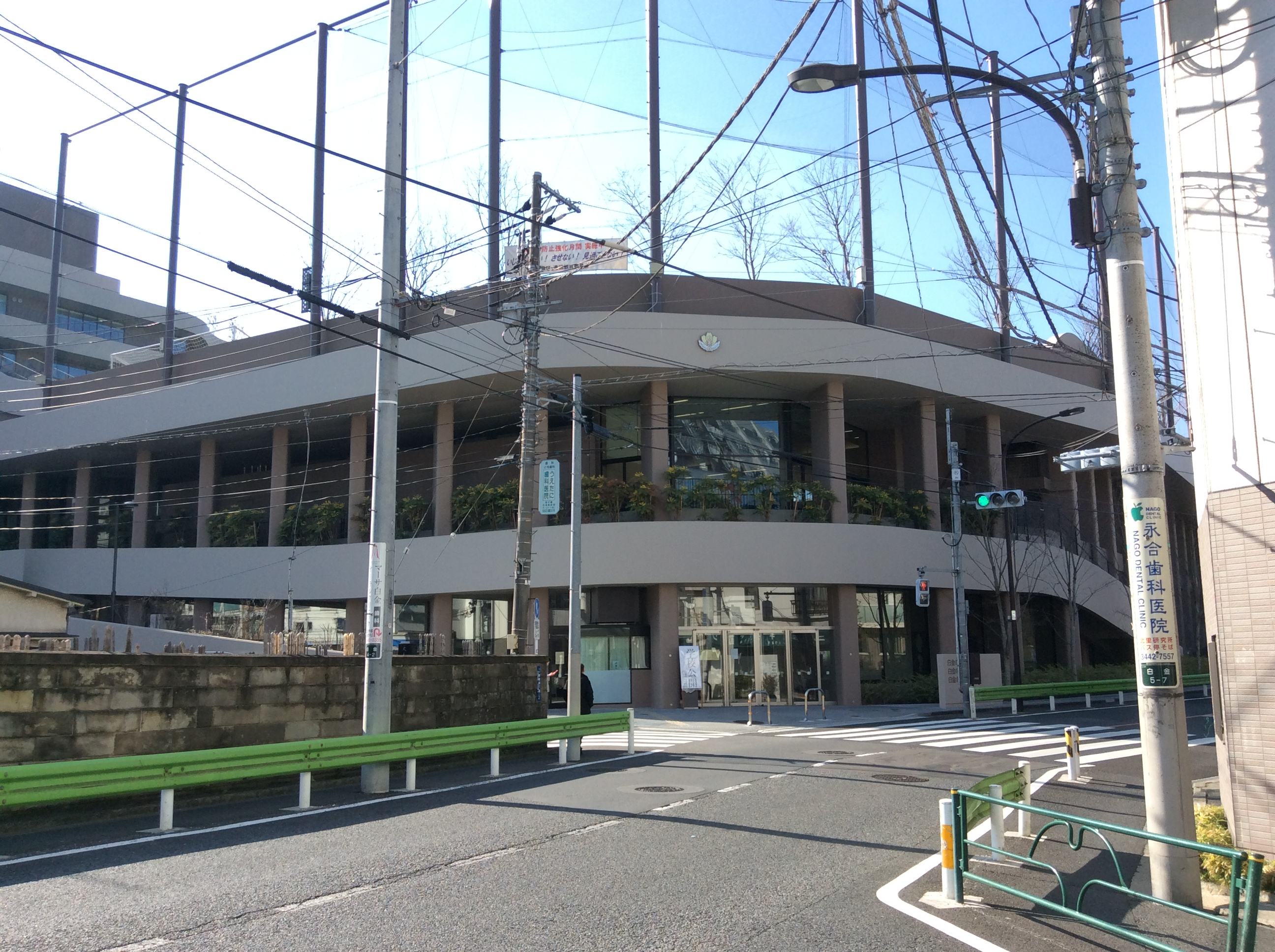
Shirogane-no-oka Gakuen (白金の丘学園)

Minato City Board of Education operates public elementary and junior high schools.

Shirokane 1 and 3-6 chōme and 2-chōme 1-5-ban are zoned to Shirogane-no-oka Gakuen (白金の丘学園) for elementary and junior high school. 2-chome 6-7 ban are zoned to Shirokane Elementary School (白金小学校) and Takamatsu Junior High School (高松中学校).

Upper secondary schools:

- Meiji Gakuin Senior High School

Colleges and universities:

- Meiji Gakuin University (明治学院大学)

== Places ==
=== Slopes ===
- Shokkō-zaka (蜀江坂)
- Sanko-zaka (三光坂)
- Meiji-zaka (明治坂)

== Gallery ==
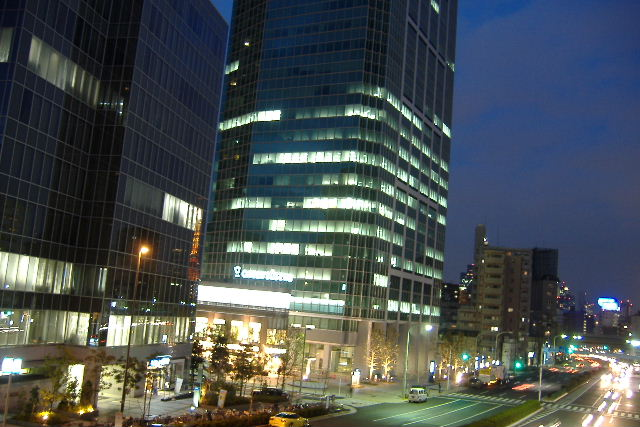
The Queens Isetan

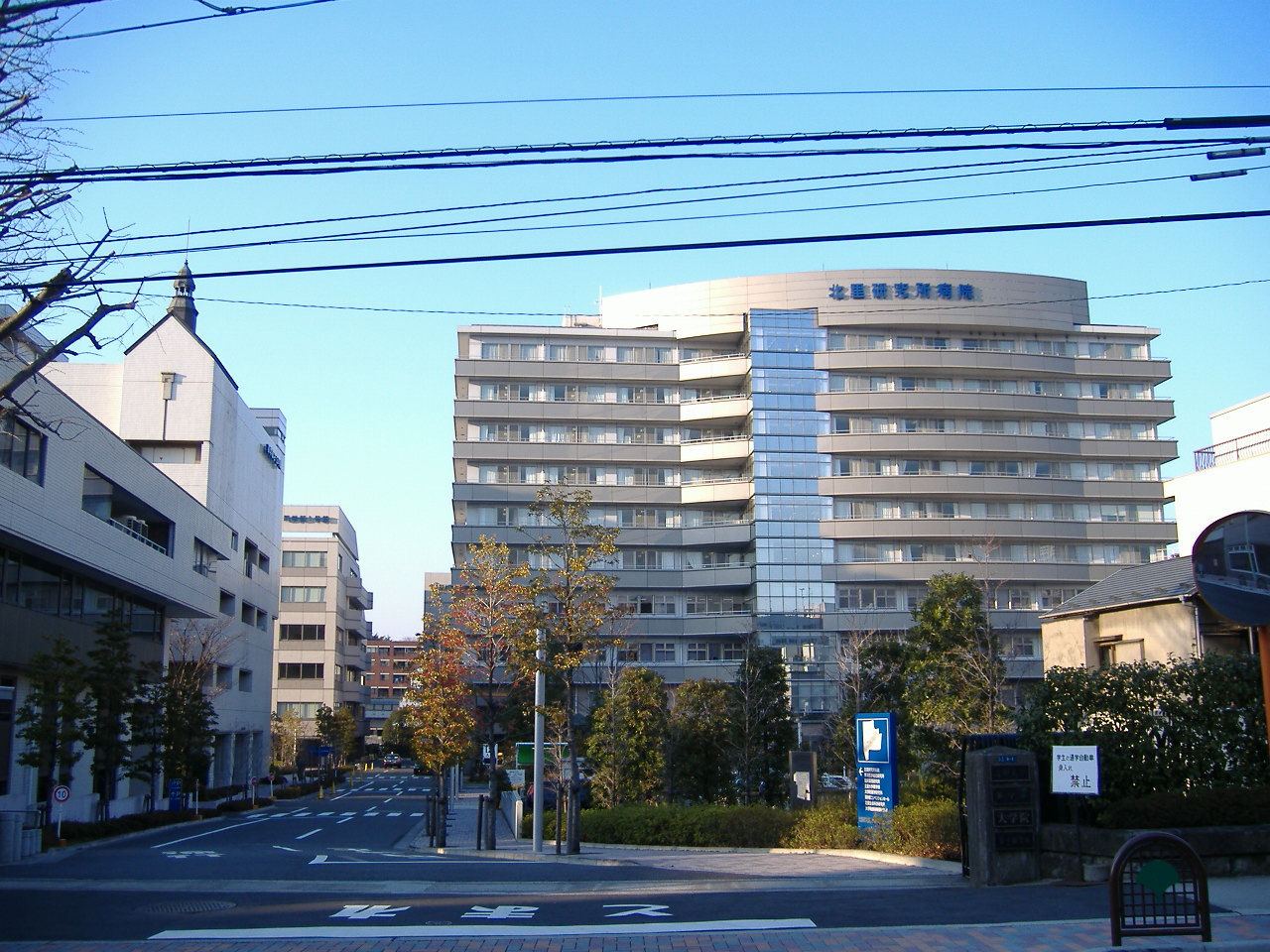
Kitasato Institute

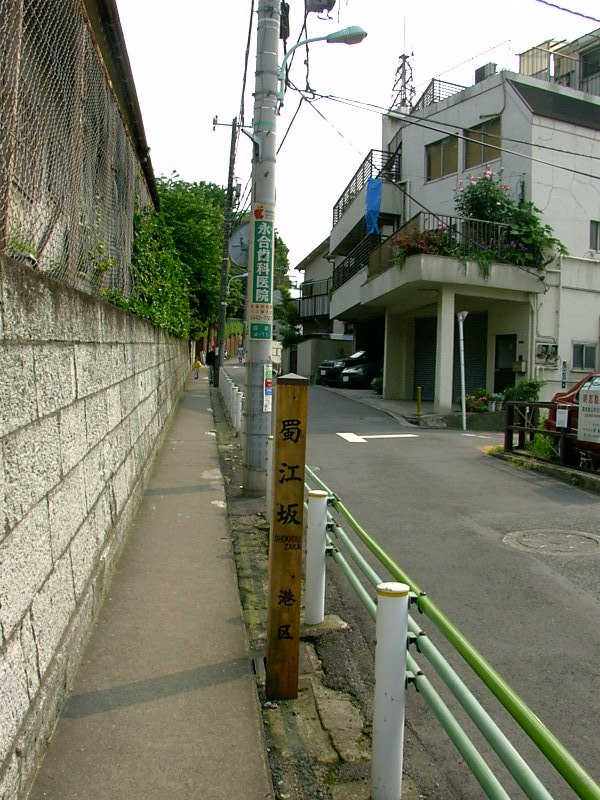
Shokkō-zaka

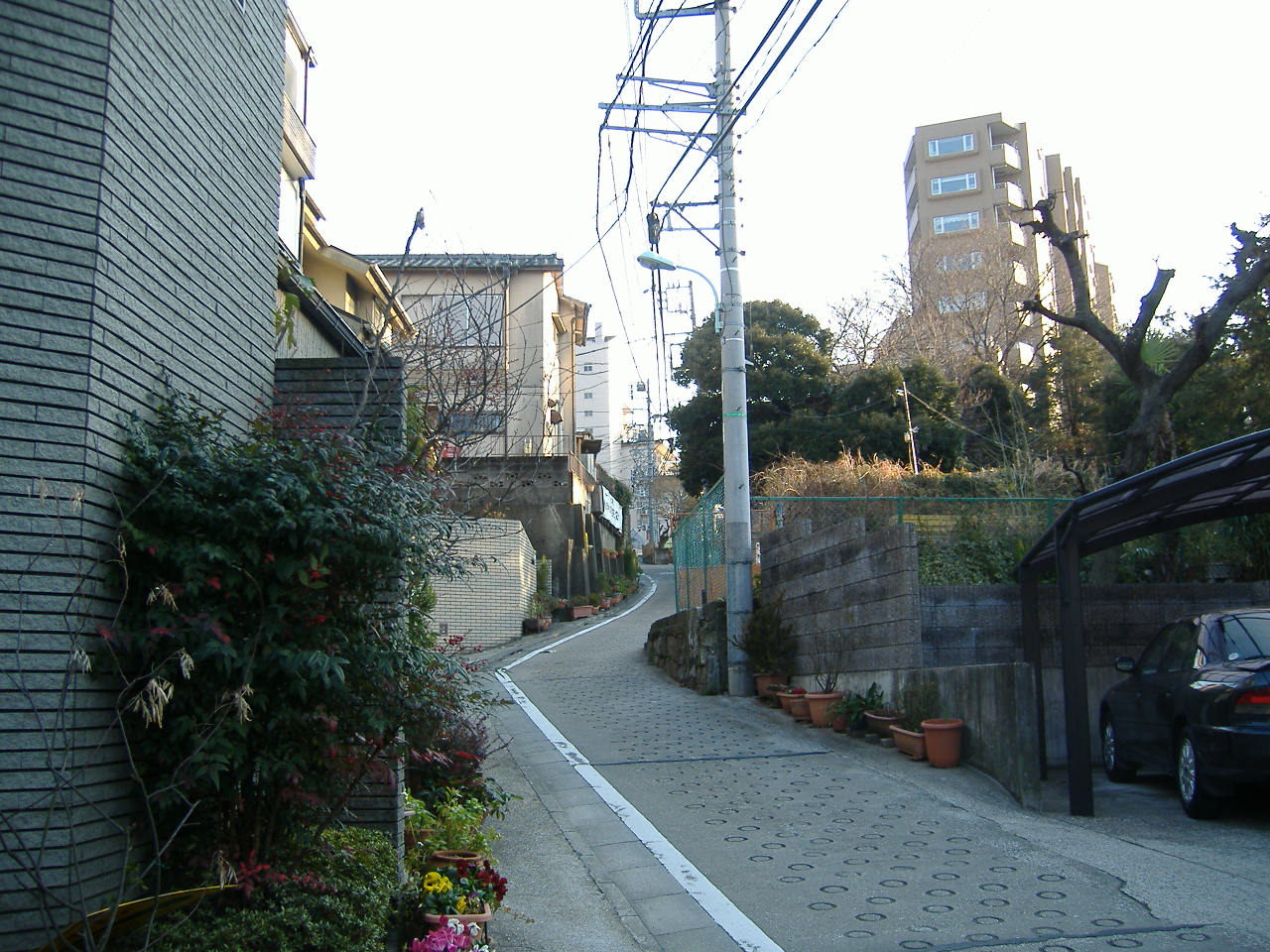
Meiji-zaka
