= Miss Universe Japan 2017 =

- Date: July 4, 2017
- Venue: Hotel Chinzanso Tokyo, Bunkyō, Tokyo, Japan
- Entrants: 47
- Placements: 16
- Winner: Momoko Abe; Chiba

Miss Universe Japan 2017 (Japanese: 2017 ミス・ユニバース・ジャパン) was the Miss Universe Japan pageant, held at the Hotel Chinzanso Tokyo in Bunkyō, Tokyo, Japan, on July 4, 2017.

Sari Nakazawa of Shiga crowned Momoko Abe of Chiba as her successor at the end of the event. Momoko represented Japan at Miss Universe 2017, held in the United States.

== Contestants ==
47 contestants competed:

Prefecture	Candidate	Japanese	Age	Height	Hometown
Aichi	Miku Makino	牧野 美来	23	170 cm (5 ft 7 in)	Nagoya
Akita	Tomoka Konno	今野 知佳	22	166 cm (5 ft 5 1/2 in)	Akita
Aomori	Keito Souma	相馬 渓音	22	164 cm (5 ft 4 1/2 in)	Aomori
Chiba	Momoko Abe	阿部 桃子	22	175 cm (5 ft 9 in)	Urayasu
Ehime	Kanako Fukuoka	福岡 佳奈子	26	170 cm (5 ft 7 in)	Matsuyama
Fukui	Mayuka Takai	高井 麻由果	20	170 cm (5 ft 7 in)	Fukui
Fukuoka	Nana Furusho	古庄 奈々	22	171 cm (5 ft 7 1/2 in)	Fukuoka
Fukushima	Ai Kobayashi	小林 愛	21	162 cm (5 ft 4 in)	Fukushima
Gifu	Saori Takeuchi	竹内 佐織	19	176 cm (5 ft 9 1/2 in)	Nagoya
Gunma	Mari Kibe	木部 真里	22	168 cm (5 ft 6 in)	Ōta
Hiroshima	Riko Manabe	真部 理子	24	171 cm (5 ft 7 1/2 in)	Hiroshima
Hokkaido	Shihori Matsui	松井 詩	22	165 cm (5 ft 5 in)	Obihiro
Hyogo	Akari Maeda	前田 明里	20	172 cm (5 ft 7 1/2 in)	Kobe
Ibaraki	Nanami Tomita	冨田 七々海	26	170 cm (5 ft 7 in)	Chiba
Ishikawa	Misaki Tabata	田端 未咲	25	173 cm (5 ft 8 in)	Kanazawa
Iwate	Haruhi Maseki	柵木 晴妃	25	173 cm (5 ft 8 in)	Morioka
Kagawa	Nene Yokode	横出 寧々	21	165 cm (5 ft 5 in)	Takamatsu
Kagoshima	Yuki Fuse	布施 夢紀	20	171 cm (5 ft 7 1/2 in)	Kagoshima
Kanagawa	Erina Shirahama	白濱 絵里奈	23	170 cm (5 ft 7 in)	Yokohama
Kochi	Haruka Maeda	前田 遥	20	170 cm (5 ft 7 in)	Kochi
Kumamoto	Mami Noguchi	野口 真未	20	169 cm (5 ft 6 1/2 in)	Kumamoto
Kyoto	Yukako Wakisaka	脇坂 友佳子	20	168 cm (5 ft 6 in)	Kyoto
Mie	Ayumi Matsui	松井 あゆ実	18	177 cm (5 ft 9 1/2 in)	Tsu
Miyagi	Tomoka Abe	阿部 智佳	24	172 cm (5 ft 7 1/2 in)	Sendai
Miyazaki	Kanami Maeda	前田 花奈実	25	169 cm (5 ft 6 1/2 in)	Miyazaki
Nagano	Natsuki Konishi	小西 夏生	24	174 cm (5 ft 8 1/2 in)	Nagano
Nagasaki	Kino Nishimura	西村 妃乃	26	173 cm (5 ft 8 in)	Sasebo
Nara	Natsuki Usuki	臼杵 夏来	20	173 cm (5 ft 8 in)	Nara
Niigata	Haruka Komagata	駒形 悠	25	173 cm (5 ft 8 in)	Niigata
Oita	Saki Sunagawa	砂川 咲季	21	172 cm (5 ft 7 1/2 in)	Beppu
Okayama	Mutsue Kobara	神原 睦枝	23	175 cm (5 ft 9 in)	Okayama
Okinawa	Erea Taira	平良 絵玲亜	27	171 cm (5 ft 7 1/2 in)	Urasoe
Osaka	Mayuka Yoshimoto	吉本 茉由	20	176 cm (5 ft 9 1/2 in)	Higashiosaka
Saga	Yuuka Araki	荒木 優佳	22	172 cm (5 ft 7 1/2 in)	Saga
Saitama	Saori Kudo	工藤 沙織	25	175 cm (5 ft 9 in)	Saitama
Shiga	Narumi Yamaguchi	山口 成美	18	172 cm (5 ft 7 1/2 in)	Kusatsu
Shimane	Sayaka Fujimoto	藤元 さやか	25	168 cm (5 ft 6 in)	Matsue
Shizuoka	Mai Goudo	神戸 麻衣	26	172 cm (5 ft 7 1/2 in)	Shizuoka
Tochigi	Kana Kato	加藤 香奈	21	167 cm (5 ft 5 1/2 in)	Utsunomiya
Tokushima	Rina Miyoshi	三好 利奈	27	167 cm (5 ft 5 1/2 in)	Miyoshi
Tokyo	Ayaka Koshiba	小柴 綾香	24	169 cm (5 ft 6 1/2 in)	Tokyo
Tottori	Honami Nishikawa	西川 穂奈美	25	167 cm (5 ft 5 1/2 in)	Tokyo
Toyama	Yuika Matsui	松井 結花	24	171 cm (5 ft 7 1/2 in)	Kobe
Wakayama	Nagisa Nakanishi	中西 渚	22	174 cm (5 ft 8 1/2 in)	Yamatokoriyama
Yamagata	Kaori Kouyama	神山 かおり	20	166 cm (5 ft 5 1/2 in)	Tokyo
Yamaguchi	Makana Ozaki	尾崎 真愛	26	168 cm (5 ft 6 in)	Ube
Yamanashi	Natsumi Tagawa	田川 夏海	22	170 cm (5 ft 7 in)	Tokyo

== Results ==
=== Placements ===
Placement	Contestant
Miss Universe Japan 2017	Chiba – Momoko Abe
1st Runner-Up	Ehime - Kanako Fukuoka
2nd Runner-Up	Tokyo - Ayaka Koshiba
3rd Runner-Up	Nagano - Natsuki Konishi
4th Runner-Up	Akita - Tomoka Konno
