= Black Japanese =

Ethnic group in Japan

Black Japanese 黒人系日本人
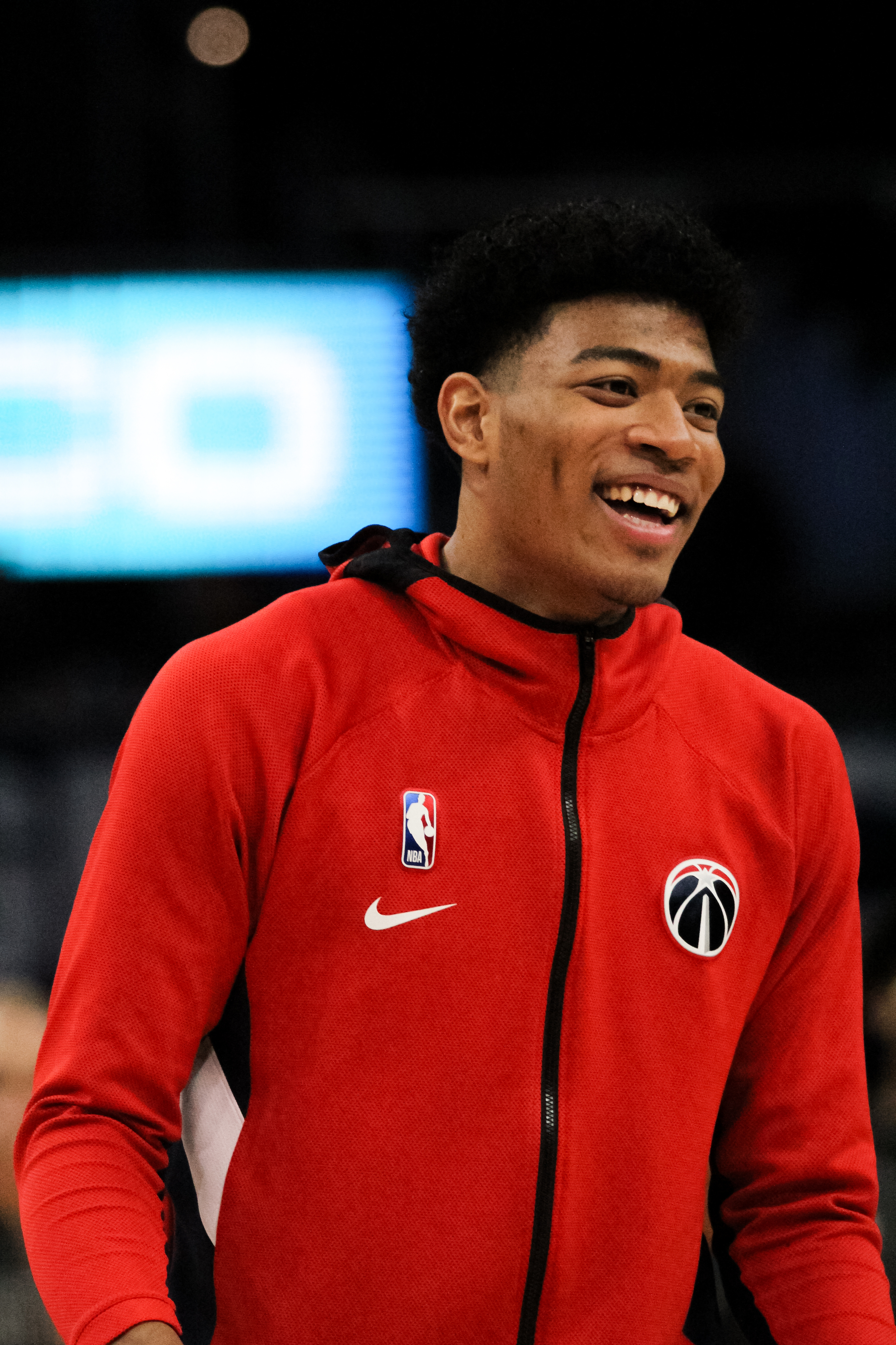
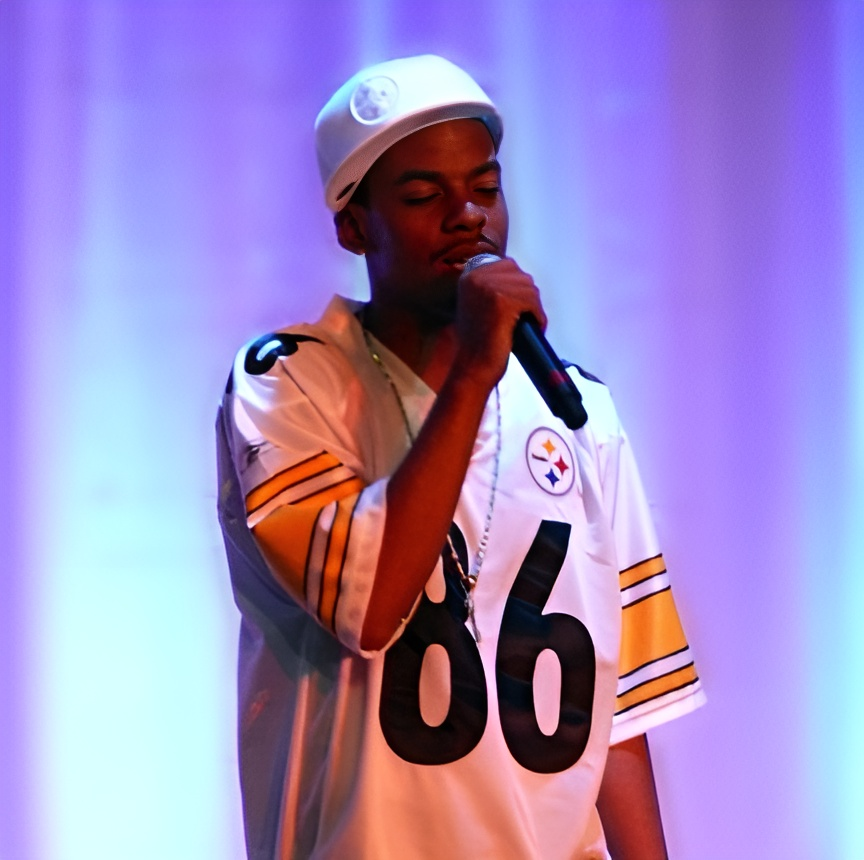
- Rui Hachimura, professional basketball player born in Toyama Jero is the first black enka singer in history.

Regions with significant populations
- Tokyo, Okinawa

Languages
- Japanese, English, African languages

Related ethnic groups
- Black people, African British

Black Japanese (黒人系日本人, Kokujinkei nihonjin) are Japanese residents or citizens who have ancestry from any of the Black racial groups of Africa.

== History ==
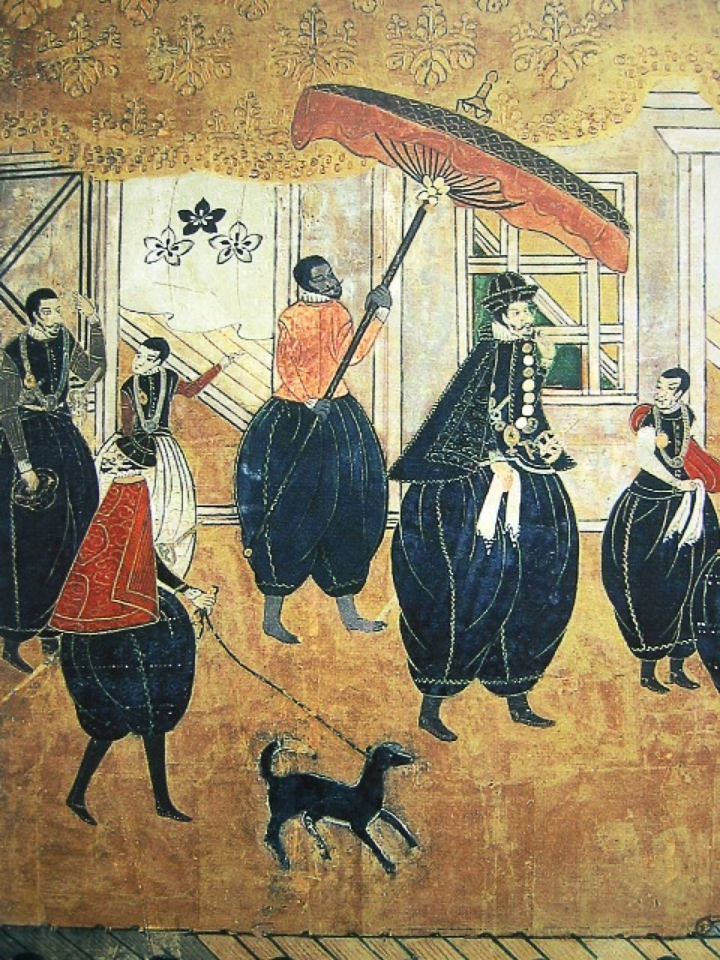
16th century, European traders and an African slave in Japan

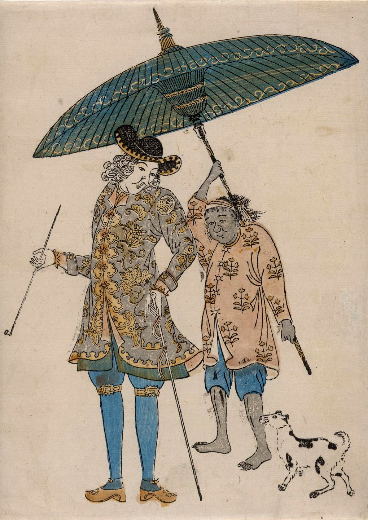
17th century, Edo period, a European trader and an African slave

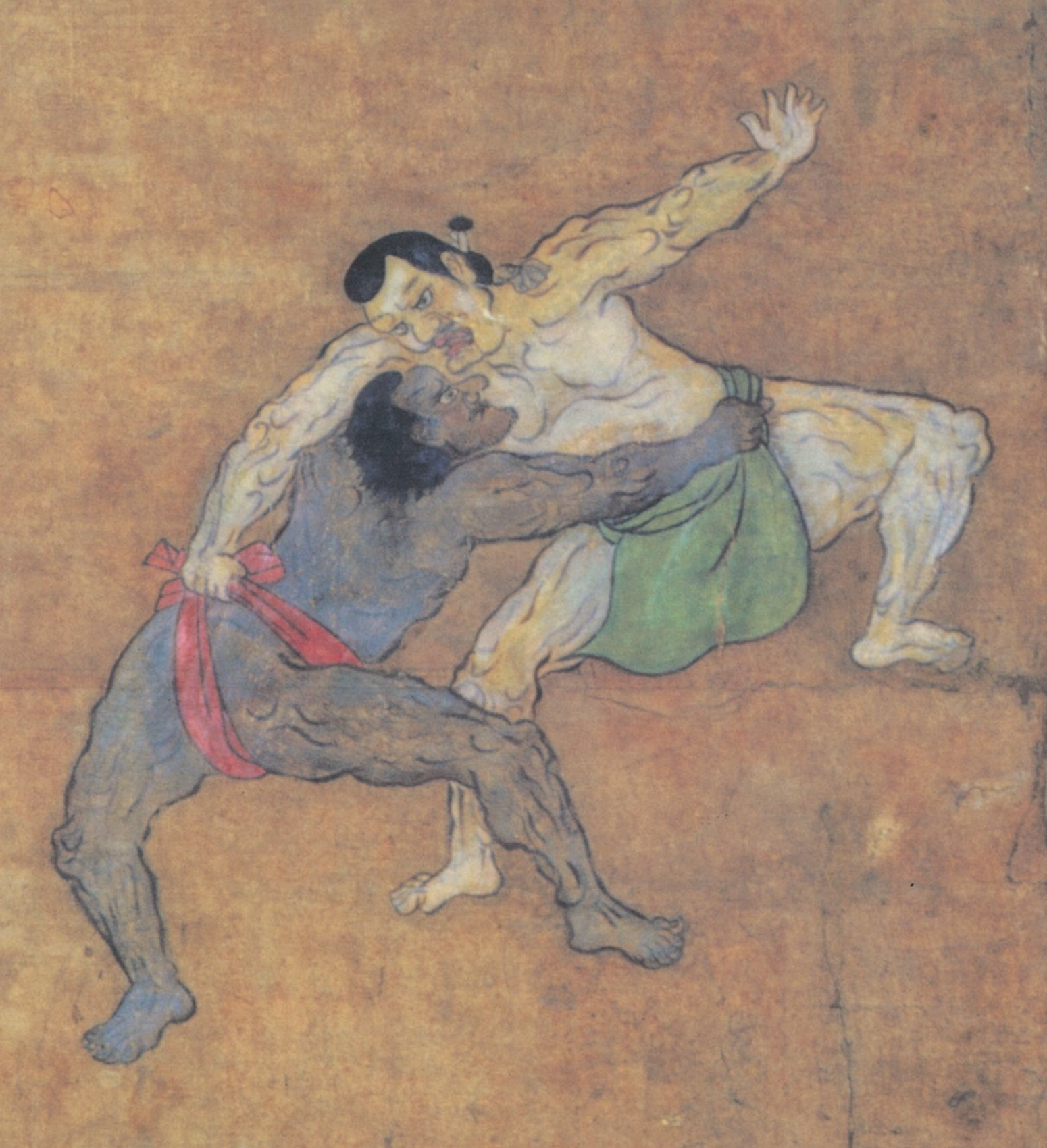
Late 16th century, a duel between an African and a Japanese wrestler

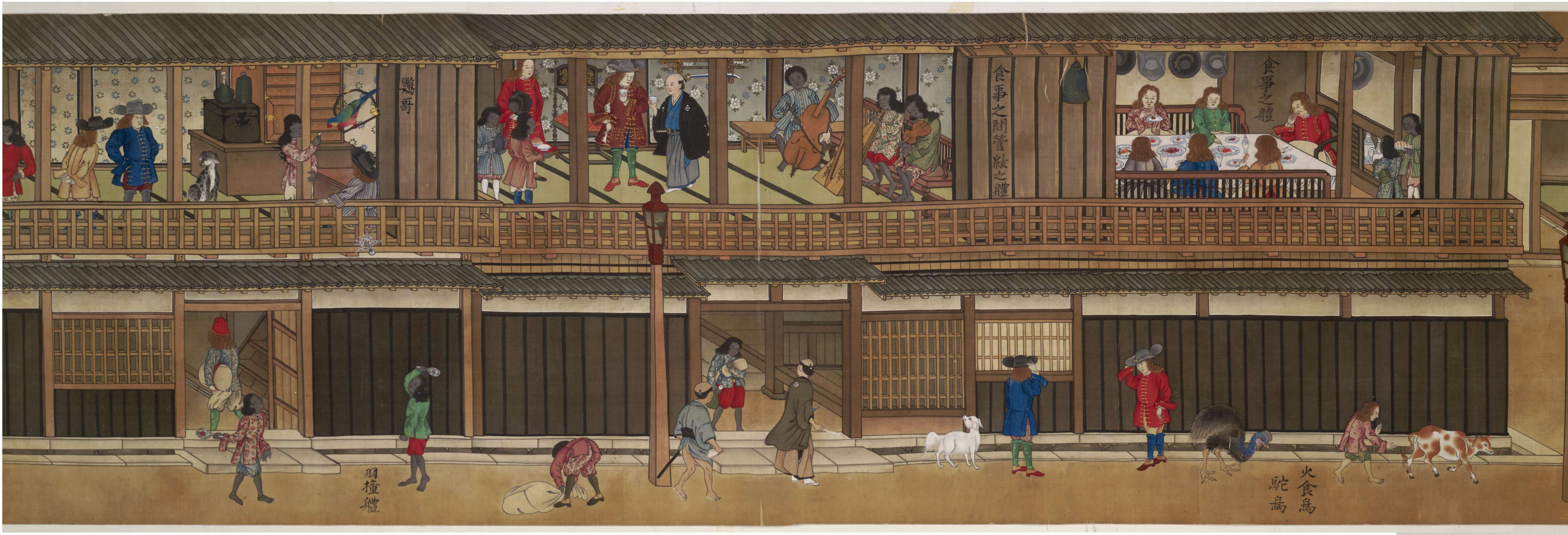
18th century, European traders and African slaves in Japan

During the 16th century at the beginning of the Edo period with the arrival of European traders, the Dutch and Portuguese, brought Africans with them to Japan in the form of slaves. These African slaves, often poorly dressed and barefoot, acted as servants to the Europeans, accompanied by exotic animals such as elephants, giraffes, zebras, and camels.

Yasuke, an African man, possibly from Mozambique, arrived in Japan in the late-16th century alongside Jesuit missionary Alessandro Valignano. He found favor with Oda Nobunaga, the daimyō and warlord, and ultimately achieved the status of a samurai.

In the 19th century, during the Bakumatsu period, African-Americans arrived in Japan under the Perry Expedition on a mission to open a commercial trade.

After World War II, with the Japanese economic miracle, many students from Africa began coming to Japan often to pursue relevant postgraduate education through MEXT and JICA. African Americans also joined the JET Programme to work as English teachers. Some African Americans arrive to serve in the United States Forces Japan.

In 2015, Ariana Miyamoto, who was born in Japan to a Japanese mother and an African-American father, became the first hāfu (a term denoting mixed ancestry) contestant to win the title of Miss Universe Japan. The decision to allow Miyamoto to win the title, as she is not full Japanese by descent, was controversial.

== Individuals ==
=== Japan-born ===
- Jim Bowie (born 1965), baseball player of African-American descent
- Sentoryū Henri (1969–2026), first sumo wrestler of African-American descent
- Aja Kong (born 1970), professional wrestler of African-American descent
- Richard T. Jones (born 1972), actor of African-American descent
- Dave Roberts (born 1972), baseball player of African-American descent
- Issey Maholo (born 1985), football goalkeeper of Congolese descent
- Crystal Kay (born 1986), pop singer of African-American descent
- Dan Howbert (born 1987), footballer of Liberian descent
- Elly (born 1987), rapper and dancer of African-American descent
- Thelma Aoyama (born 1987), R&B singer of Afro-Trinidadian descent
- Karen Nun-Ira (born 1991), judoka of Ghanaian descent
- Ariana Miyamoto (born 1994), beauty contestant of African-American descent
- Evelyn Mawuli (born 1995), basketball player of Ghanaian descent
- Ado Onaiwu (born 1995), footballer of Nigerian descent
- Boniface Nduka (born 1996), footballer of Nigerian descent
- Aisha Harumi Tochigi (born 1996), model of Ghanaian descent
- Zachary Herivaux (born 1996), footballer of Haitian descent
- Powell Obinna Obi (born 1997), footballer of Nigerian descent
- Naomi Osaka (born 1997), tennis player of Haitian descent
- Charles Nduka (born 1998), footballer of Nigerian descent
- Stephanie Mawuli (born 1998), basketball player of Ghanaian descent
- Hisashi Appiah Tawiah (born 1998), footballer of Ghanaian descent
- Rui Hachimura (born 1998), basketball player of Beninese descent
- Jefferson Tabinas (born 1998), Japanese footballer of Ghanaian descent
- Osamu Henry Iyoha (born 1998), footballer of Nigerian descent
- Randy Emeka Obi (born 1999), footballer of Nigerian descent
- Abdul Hakim Sani Brown (born 1999), sprinter of Ghanaian descent
- Ibrahim Junior Kuribara (born 2001), footballer of Ghanaian descent
- Solomon Sakuragawa (born 2001), footballer of Nigerian descent
- Kashif Bangnagande (born 2001), footballer of Ghanaian descent
- Leo Kokubo (born 2001), footballer of Nigerian descent
- Keita Buwanika (born 2002), footballer of Ugandan descent
- Paul Tabinas (born 2002), footballer of Ghanaian descent
- Joel Chima Fujita (born 2002), footballer of Nigerian descent
- Kevin Pierre Jr. (born 2003), footballer of African-American descent
- Anrie Chase (born 2004), footballer of Jamaican descent

=== Foreign-born ===
- Asuka Cambridge (born 1993), Jamaica-born sprinter
- Pape Mour Faye (born 1986), Senegal-born basketballer
- Samba Faye (born 1987), Senegal-born basketballer
- Chris Hart (born 1984), US-born pop singer
- Jero (born 1981), US-born enka singer
- Kotaro Matsushima (born 1993), South Africa-born rugby union player
- Kaoru Mfaume (born 1976), US-born entertainment producer
- Ike Nwala (born 1986), US-born TV presenter and comedian
- Andy Ologun (born 1983), Nigeria-born professional boxer, mixed martial artist, kickboxer, and actor
- Bobby Ologun (born 1968), Nigeria-born television personality
- Alessandro Santos (born 1977), Brazil-born footballer
- Mandy Sekiguchi (born 1991), US-born rapper
- Jelani Reshaun Sumiyoshi (born 1997), US-born footballer
- Musashi Suzuki (born 1994), Jamaica-born footballer
- Zion Suzuki (born 2002), US-born footballer
- Yasuke, an African man, possibly from Mozambique, arrived in Japan in the late-16th century alongside Jesuit missionary Alessandro Valignano. He found favor with Oda Nobunaga, the daimyō and warlord, and ultimately achieved the status of a samurai.
