= Lee Ji-seon =

South Korean actress and model (born 1983)

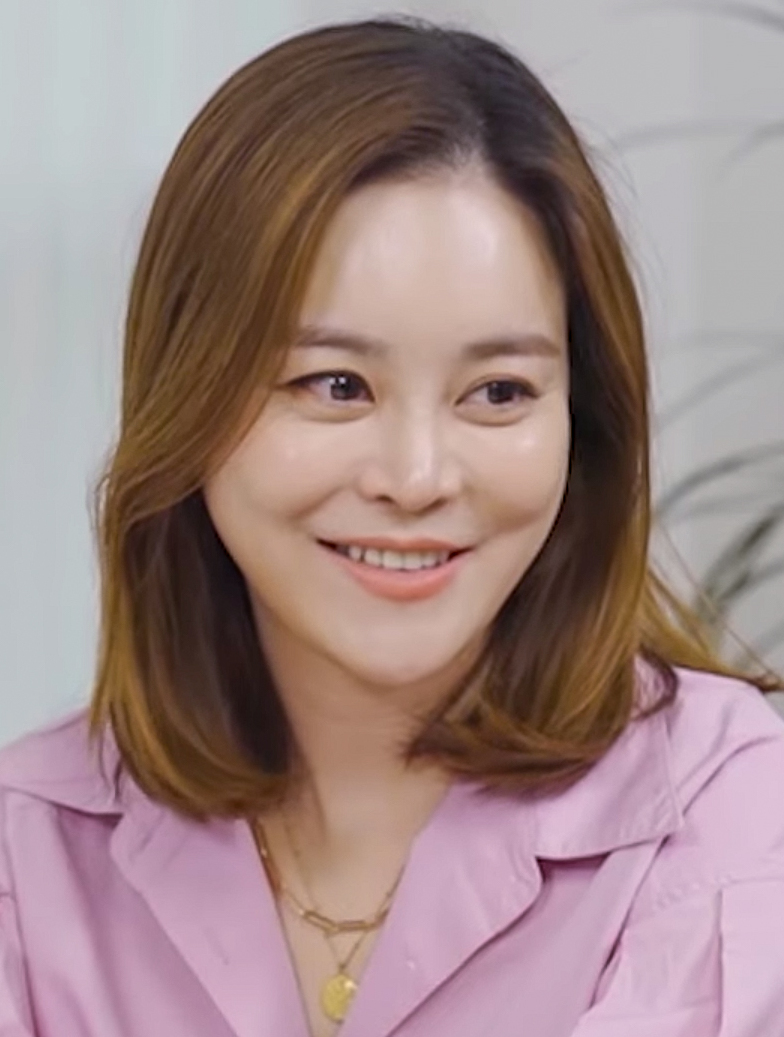
- Lee in 2021
- Born: Lee Ji-seon; April 6, 1983 (age 43); Seoul, South Korea
- Education: Parsons The New School for Design; Jinseon Girls' High School
- Height: 1.7 m (5 ft 7 in)
- Beauty pageant titleholder
- Title: Miss Korea 2007
- Hair color: Black
- Eye color: Brown
- Major competitions: Miss Korea 2007 (winner); Miss Universe 2008 (Unplaced)

Lee Ji-seon (Korean: 이지선, born April 6, 1983), also known as Sun Lee in the Western media, is a South Korean actress, model and beauty pageant titleholder who attended Parsons The New School for Design. She was crowned Miss Korea 2007 and represented her country at the Miss Universe 2008 pageant held in Nha Trang, Vietnam with 79 other delegates.

== Miss Korea 2007 ==
Lee competed in the 51st Miss Korea pageant, which she won. Lee donated 100% of her Miss Korea winnings to a charity fund for the elderly. Lee has also spent 3 days in North Korea as a Peace Ambassador for the World Trade Centers Association.

== Miss Universe 2008 ==
Prior to the pageant, Lee underwent training, alongside Hiroko Mima, with the director of Miss Universe Japan Ines Ligron. Ligron was responsible for the training of former Miss Universe 2007 Riyo Mori and 1st-runner up of 2006 Kurara Chibana. Despite being favoured by numerous pageant sites as a potential semi-finalist, Ligron's claim that Lee had a shot at the crown, and her determination to do well in the pageant, she was ultimately unplaced on the final night.

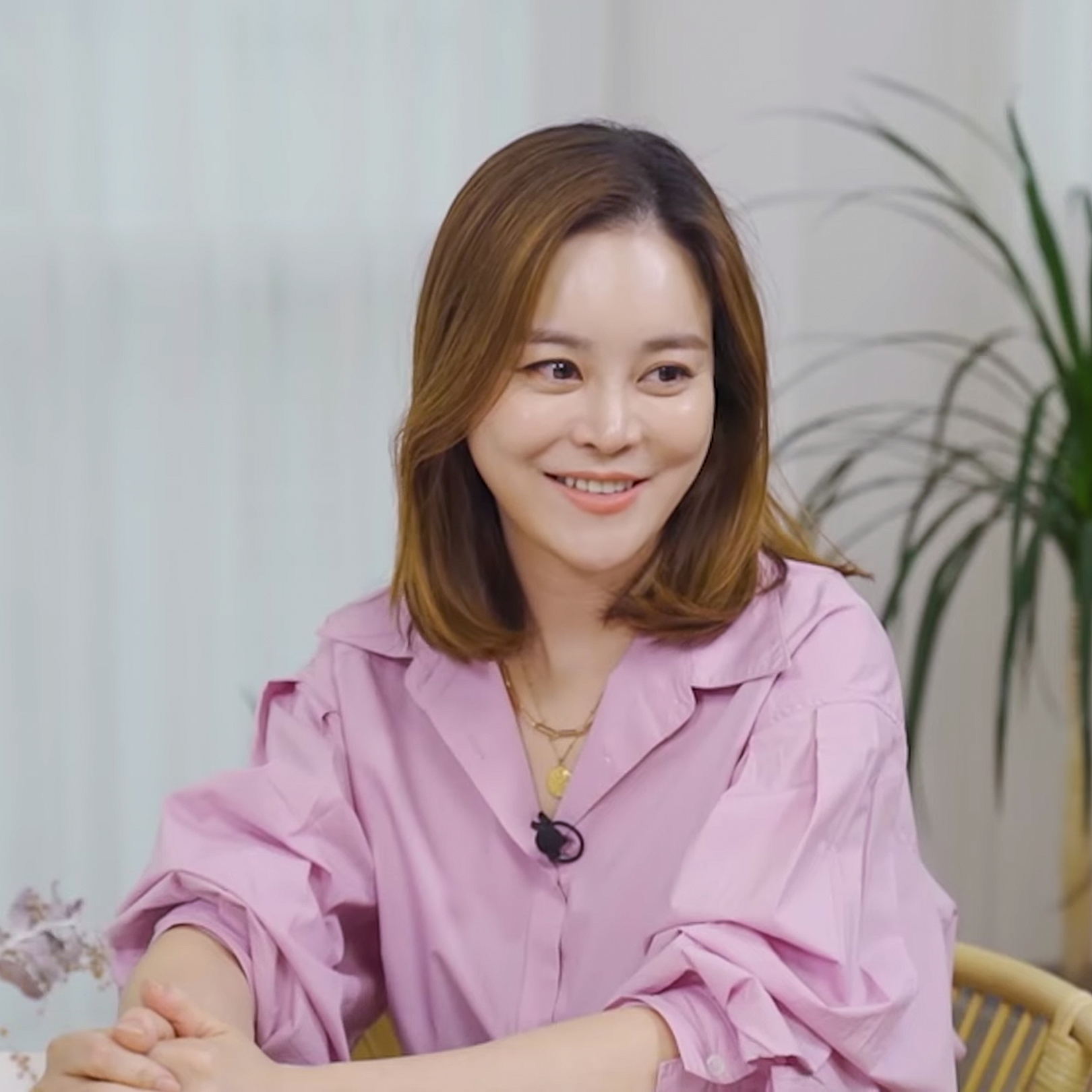
Lee in 2021

Awards and achievements
Preceded by Lee Ha-nui	Miss Korea; 2007	Succeeded by Na Ree
