= Riyo Mori =

Japanese dancer, actress, model, and beauty queen (born 1986)

- 森 理世
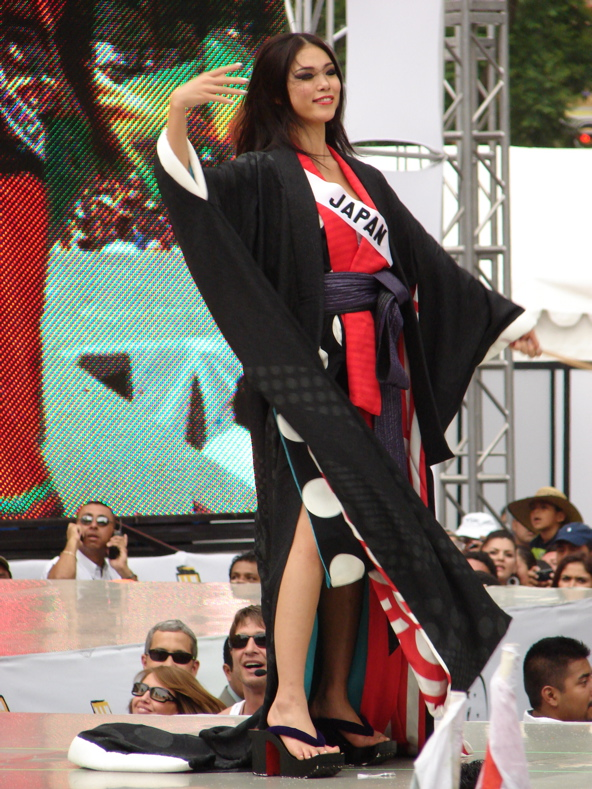
- Mori in 2007
- Born: December 24, 1986 (age 39); Aoi-ku, Shizuoka, Japan
- Height: 1.74 m (5 ft 8 1/2 in)
- Spouse: Brent Kaspar (m. 2018)
- Children: 1
- Beauty pageant titleholder
- Title: Miss Universe Japan 2007; Miss Universe 2007
- Hair color: Black
- Eye color: Brown
- Major competitions: Miss Universe Japan 2007 (Winner); Miss Universe 2007 (Winner)

Riyo Mori (森 理世, Mori Riyo) (born December 24, 1986) is a Japanese actress, dancer, model, and beauty queen who was crowned Miss Universe 2007 in Mexico City.

== Personal life ==
An only child, Mori began dancing at age four. She studied at Quinte Ballet School and graduated from Centennial Secondary School in Belleville, Ontario, Canada. Mori also completed her Grade 11 year at Mount Douglas Secondary School in Victoria, British Columbia, Canada.

On August 28, 2018, she married Brent Kaspar, an American attorney. They have a daughter.

== Miss Universe 2007 ==
Mori was crowned Miss Universe on May 28, 2007, by the outgoing titleholder, Zuleyka Rivera.

In the final competition, broadcast internationally on May 28, 2007, Mori was announced as one of 15 semifinalists who would compete for the title. She received the highest score in the swimsuit competition, which advanced her to the top ten and the evening gown competition, in which she placed fourth. Mori's kimono-inspired black/floral evening gown of choice came from Gucci's spring/summer 2007 collection.

Riyo Mori, in her hotel room at the Ritz Carlton

In the last round, Elle magazine fashion director and Project Runway judge Nina Garcia asked Mori to speak about a lesson she learned as a child that still affects her life. Mori said that she had been dancing since childhood and hence was constantly surrounded by students and teachers. She said she had learned from them to always be happy, patient, and positive. She also expressed a desire to teach these principles to the next generation.

At the conclusion of the competition, Mori was crowned Miss Universe, becoming only the second Japanese woman to hold the title, after Akiko Kojima in 1959. Mori is the 11th Asian woman to win the pageant.

Mori was the third Japanese woman to place in the top five at Miss Universe in the past decade. Miyako Miyazaki placed fourth runner-up at Miss Universe 2003 and Kurara Chibana was first runner-up in 2006. Mori said she aimed to use her success and popularity as a springboard into humanitarian causes, saying, "I think I have a samurai soul, I'm very patient, and I can serve others." As of May 2008, Mori had traveled to Indonesia, Spain, the Bahamas, St. Kitts and Nevis, China, Mexico, Canada, Germany, Vietnam, France, Monaco, San Marino, Russia, and Italy, in addition to numerous trips and her homecoming in Japan. She also visited numerous U.S. cities.

On July 14, 2008, Mori crowned her successor, Venezuela native Dayana Mendoza, with a tiara worth $120,000 at the Miss Universe 2008 pageant in Nha Trang, Vietnam.

== Television ==
In interviews about her future, Mori revealed plans to open a multicultural dance school in Tokyo. She also expressed enthusiasm about her audition for the role of Yaeko on the American television series Heroes.

Mori starred in Donald Trump's MTV reality show Pageant Place along with Rachel Smith (Miss USA 2007), Tara Conner, (Miss USA 2006), Katie Blair (Miss Teen USA 2006), and Hilary Cruz (Miss Teen USA 2007). The show started airing on October 10, 2007, and ran for eight episodes.

Mori appeared in Jessica Simpson's VH1 reality show The Price of Beauty in 2010 to showcase the standards of beauty in Japan.

In 2016, Mori was guest judge in the preliminary competition of 65th Miss Universe in the Mall of Asia Arena, Pasay, Metro Manila, Philippines on Fox. She also served as a judge at Miss Universe 2019.

Awards and achievements
Preceded by (Puerto Rico) Zuleyka Rivera	Miss Universe; 2007	Succeeded by (Venezuela) Dayana Mendoza
Preceded by Kurara Chibana	Miss Universe Japan; 2007	Succeeded by Hiroko Mima
