= Seikei University =

Private university in Musashino, Tokyo, Japan

Coordinates: 35°42′50″N 139°34′25″E

- 成蹊大学
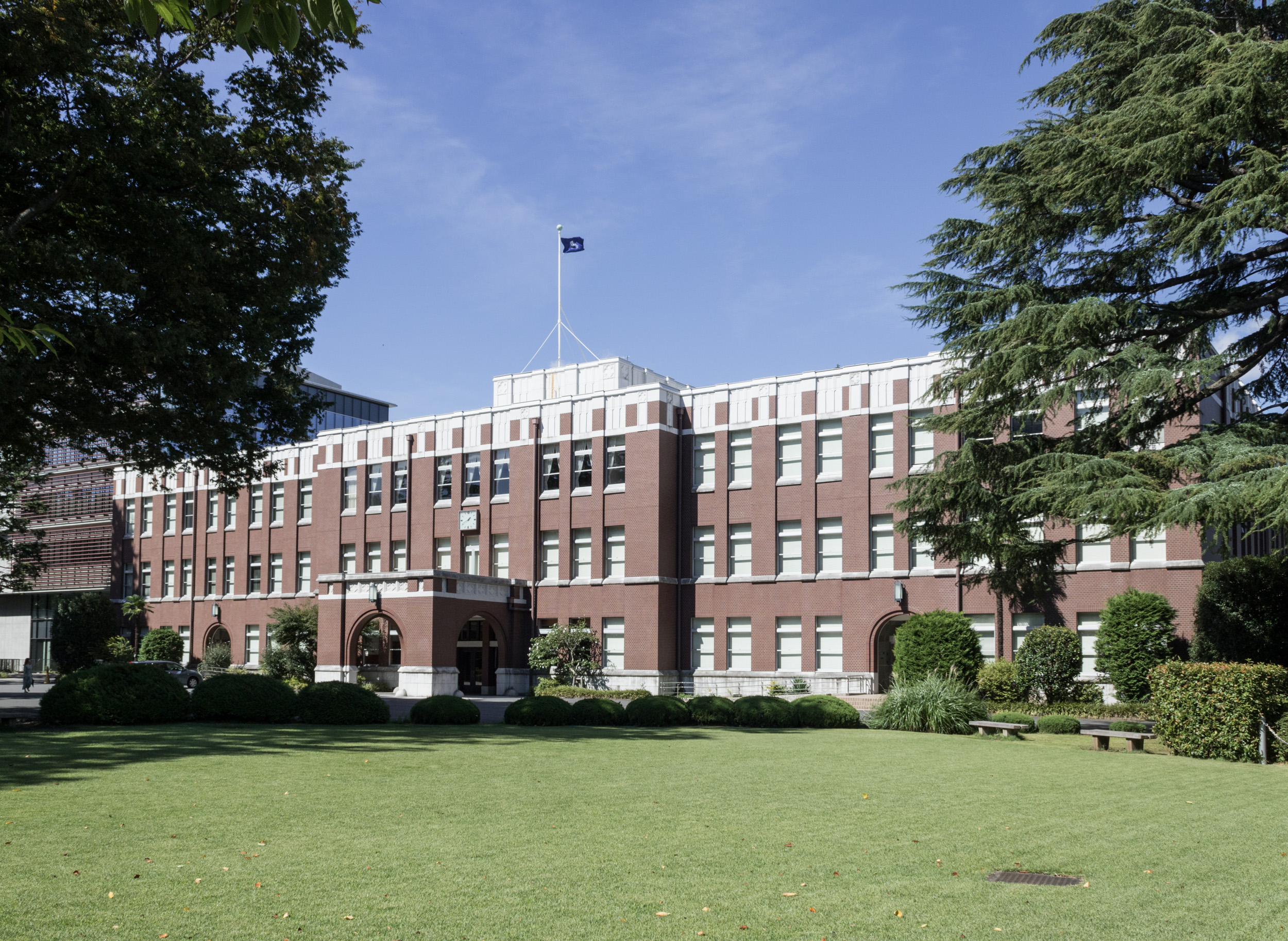
- Seikei University main building, 2018
- Type: Private
- Established: Founded 1906, Chartered 1949
- President: Yoichi Kamejima
- Location: Musashino, Tokyo, Japan
- Campus: Urban
- Colors: Prussian blue
- Website: seikei.ac.jp (in English); seikei.ac.jp (in Japanese)

Seikei University (成蹊大学, Seikei daigaku) is a private university in the Kichijōji area of the city of Musashino, Tokyo, Japan. Its name derives from a passage in the Records of the Grand Historian by Sima Qian. Its campus is noted for its rows of zelkova trees, which is listed as one of the 100 Soundscapes of Japan.

== Overview ==
The university was established as a university in 1949 under the new School Education Law. Its predecessor dates back to 1906 and was supported by Koyata Iwasaki, the fourth head of the Mitsubishi zaibatsu. Before World War II, the institution was financially supported by donations from Mitsubishi Group. After World War II, it became independent from Mitsubishi Group after dissolution of the zaibatsu. However, Seikei University still has close connections with the Mitsubishi Group. This university has many graduates from families of noble or business backgrounds.

== Marunouchi Business Training (MBT) ==
In the spring of 2013, Seikei University launched the Marunouchi Business Training (MBT) program for third-year students and first-year graduate students, with the main setting being Marunouchi, the business center of Tokyo.

This is a seven-month, cross-disciplinary, industry-academia collaboration human resource development program that aims to build the foundation for the skills needed in society through thorough practical experience.

After "on-campus preparatory training" to hone logical thinking skills and "Marunouchi training" where students work on assigned tasks under the guidance of company representatives, students participate in "internship training" at a company. Finally, they present the results of their assignments and internship to company representatives at the "Marunouchi Results Presentation."

The cooperating companies are mainly from the Mitsubishi Group, which has close ties with Seikei University. A total of 21 companies participated in the program in 2013, and 23 in 2014. They come from a wide range of industries, including finance, trading, real estate, heavy industry, steel, non-ferrous metals, and automobiles, and are all major companies.

== Organization ==
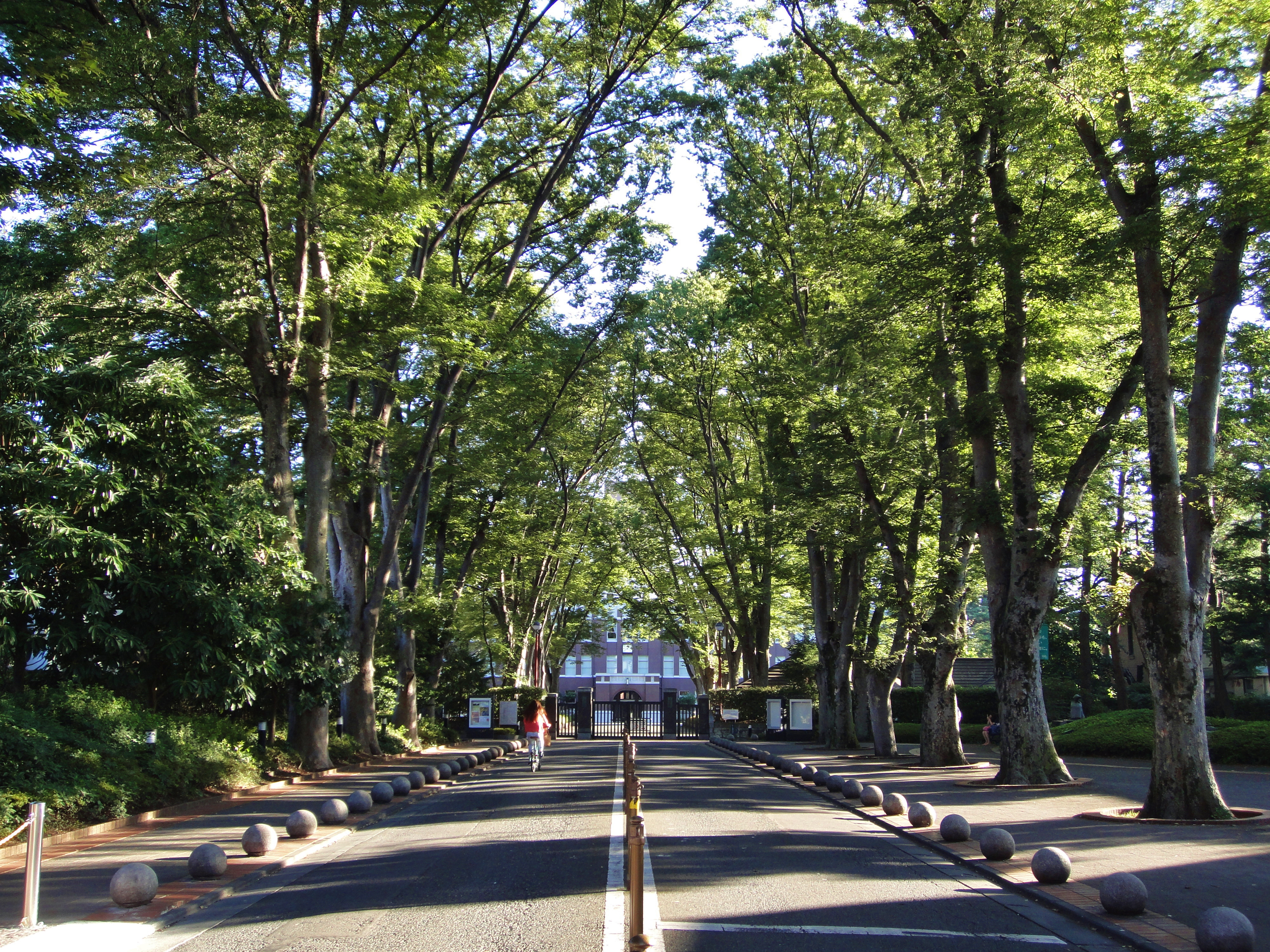
Seikei Gakuen Zelkova trees

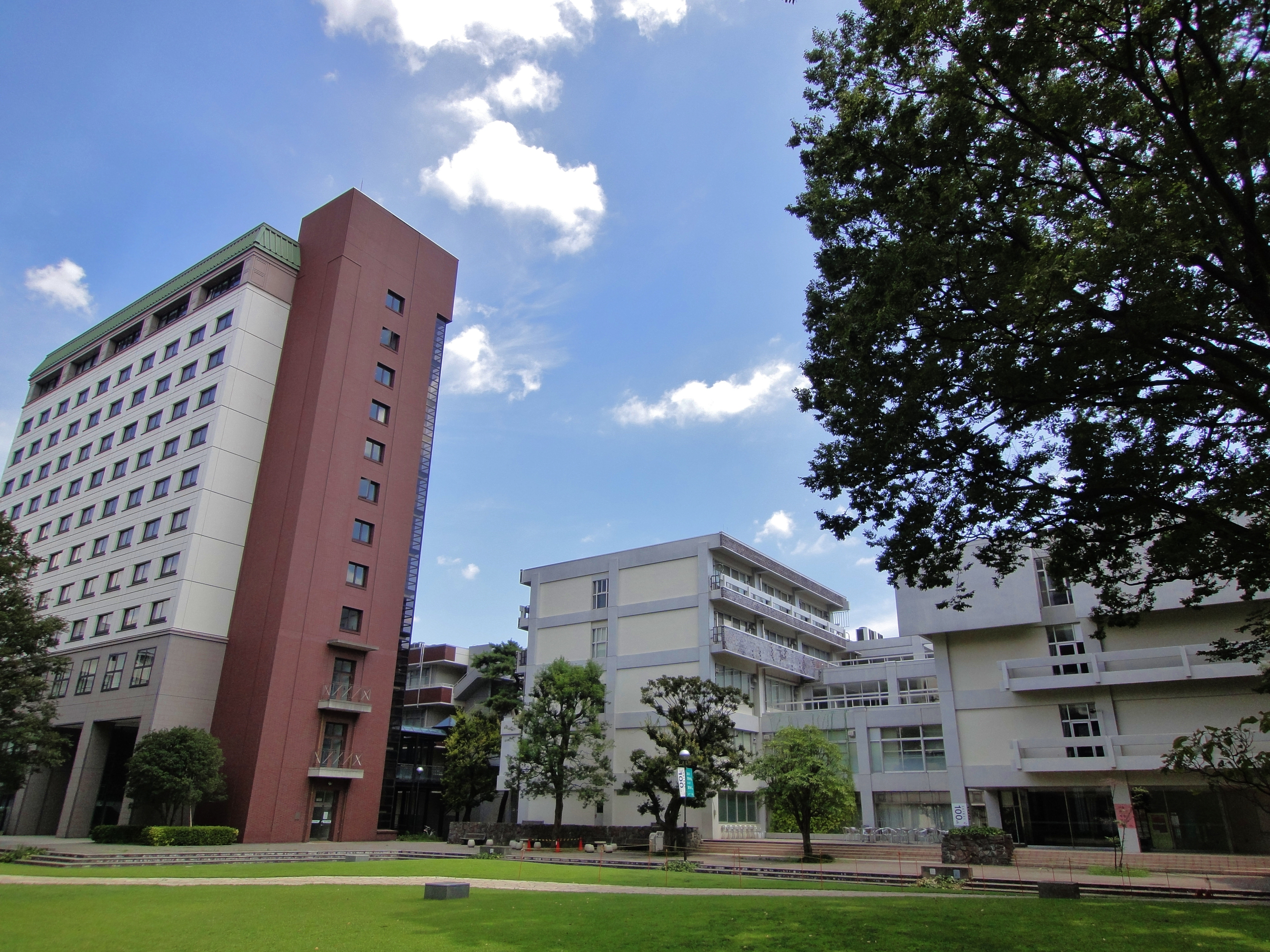
Seikei University Building No. 1, No.2 and No. 10

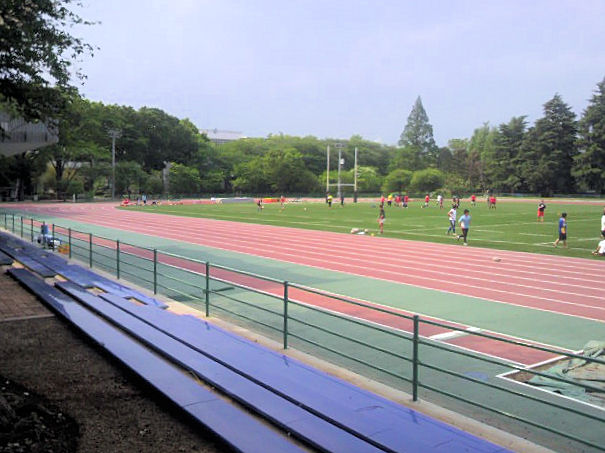
Keyaki Ground (400 m stadium) * The auditorium can accommodate about 1200 people

=== Undergraduate Faculties ===
- Faculty of Economics
  - Department of Mathematical Economics
  - Department of Modern Economics
- Faculty of Business Administration
  - Department of Business Administration
- Faculty of Law
  - Department of Law
  - Department of Political Science
- Faculty of Humanities
  - Department of Japanese Literature
  - Department of Cross-Cultural Studies
  - Department of Contemporary Societies
  - Department of English
- Faculty of Global Studies and Sustainability
  - Major in Grobal Japanese Studies
  - Major in Environmental Sustainability Studies
- Faculty of Science and Technology
  - Major in Data and Mathematical Sciences
  - Major in Computer Scienses
  - Major in Machanical Systems Engineering
  - Major in Electrical and Electronic Engineering
  - Major in Aplied Chemistry

=== Graduate schools ===
- Graduate School of Economics and Management
- Graduate School of Law and Political Science
- Graduate School of Humanities
- Graduate School of Science and Technology

=== Research institutes ===
- Center for Asian and Pacific Studies
- Seikei Institute for International Studies
- Seikei Center for Higher Education Development
- Seikei Education and Research Center for Sustainable Development
- Seikei University Institute for a Super-Smart Society
- Science and Engineering Research Institute
- Academic rankings

=== Alumni rankings ===
École des Mines de Paris ranks Seikei University as 89th in the world in 2009 (89th in 2008) in terms of the number of alumni listed among CEOs in the 500 largest worldwide companies. (The university is also ranked 9th in Japan.)

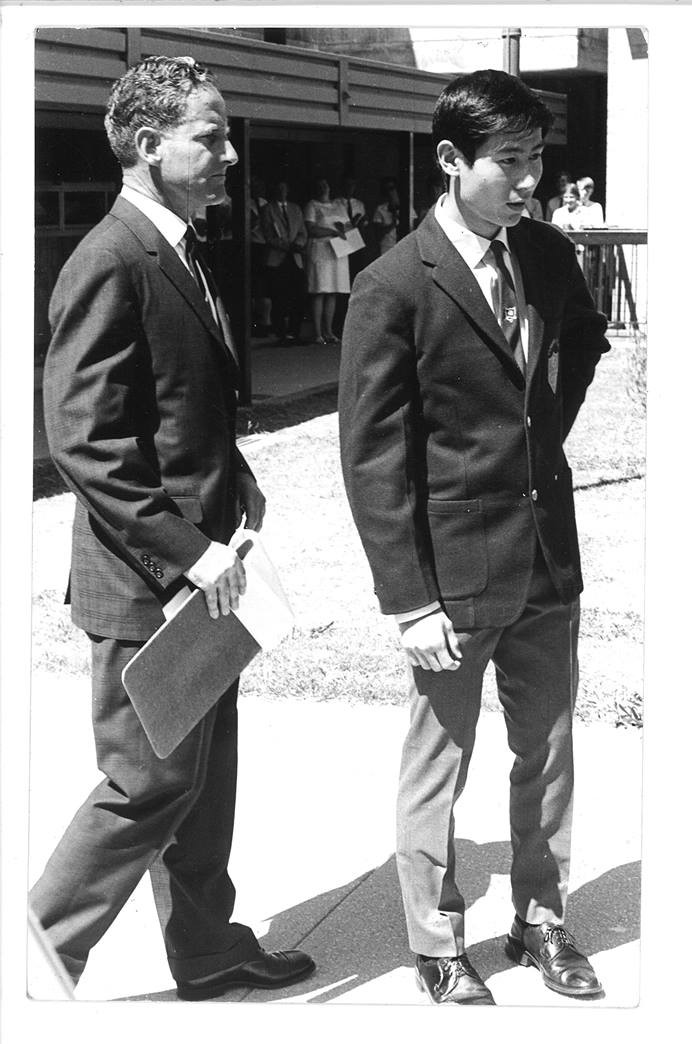
Keiji Takezawa supported for is arrival address to the student body by Mr Albert J Oliver MBE at Cowra High School 1970

== Attached school ==
The university and its attached schools are jointly managed by the Seikei Gakuen School Corporation (学校法人成蹊学園).

Seikei Senior High School

Seikei high school has an exchange study program with St. Paul's School and Phillips Exeter Academy in New Hampshire and Cowra High School (1970-2023) and St Raphaels School (since 2025) in Cowra, New South Wales, Australia.

There is a study abroad program with Choate Rosemary Hall, Pembroke College, Cambridge and University of California, Davis.

Seikei Junior High School
Seikei Elementary School

== Notable alumni ==
- Shinzō Abe, former Prime Minister of Japan (2006–2007, 2012–2020), former President of Liberal Democratic Party (Japan)
- Keiji Furuya, Japanese politician of the Liberal Democratic Party (Japan)
- Jesús Fukasaku, Japanese politician of the Democratic Party For the People
- Hayato Nakamura, Japanese politician of the Liberal Democratic Party (Japan)
- Momoko Degawa, Japanuse politician of the Liberal Democratic Party (Japan)
- Shunpei Tsukahara, Japanese politician
- Mamoru Takano, Japanese politician of the Democratic Party
- Takao Sato, Japanese politician
- Izumi Kobayashi, Secretary of Multilateral Investment Guarantee Agency
- Yasuyuki Yoshinaga, President of Fuji Heavy Industries
- Takashi Kusama, President of Mizuho Securities
- Susumu Shirayama, President of Seibu Railway
- Toshio Mita, Chairman of Chubu Electric Power
- Masahiro Ouga, President of Shogakukan
- Shiro Kikuchi, President of Asahi Soft Drinks
- Natsuo Kirino, novelist (Naoki Prize winner)
- Ira Ishida, novelist (Naoki Prize winner)
- Mariko Koike, novelist (Naoki Prize winner)
- Yuichi Takai, novelist (Akutagawa Prize winner)
- Aya Takashima, TV announcer
- Kiichi Nakai, actor
- Shingo Tsurumi, actor
- Hairi Katagiri, actress
- Kei Yamamoto, actor
- Luke Takamura, musician and songwriter
- Tadashi Nakamura, football player
- Hiroshi Kazato, racecar driver
- Maria Kamiyama, 2011 Miss Universe Japan
- Kwon Ri-se, 2009 Miss Korea contestant and Ladies' Code member
- Wataru Ishizaka, politician and social worker

== Study abroad agreement ==
- United Kingdom
  - University of Cambridge
  - University of Edinburgh
  - University of Manchester
  - Cardiff University
  - Oxford Brookes University
- Spain
  - University of Alcalá
  - University of Santiago de Compostela
- Germany
  - University of Bonn
  - Heidelberg University
  - LMU Munich
- France
  - Jean Moulin University Lyon 3
- Ireland
  - Dublin City University
- Belgium
  - Free University of Brussels
- Italy
  - University of Bologna
  - University of Venice
- Norway
  - University of Bergen
- Iceland
  - University of Iceland
- Romania
- Romanian-American University
- Australia
  - Griffith University
  - Monash University
  - Murdoch University
  - University of Queensland
- New Zealand
  - University of Auckland
- United States
  - American University
  - California State University
  - San Francisco State University
  - Western Washington University
  - San Diego State University
  - University of Memphis
  - University of Hawaii
  - University of Wisconsin
- Canada
  - University of Victoria
  - Memorial University of Newfoundland
- China
  - Tongji University
  - Fudan University
  - Peking University
  - Guangdong University of Foreign Studies
  - Shanghai Jiao Tong University
  - East China University of Political Science and Law
- South Korea
  - Korea University
  - Ewha Womans University
  - Hanyang University
  - Hongik University
  - Jeonju University
  - Konkuk University
- Taiwan
  - Tamkang University
  - Shin Chien University
- Thailand
  - Chiang Mai University
- Malaysia
  - Asia Pacific University of Technology & Innovation
  - Berjaya University
- Vietnam
  - Ho Chi Minh City University of Education

== See also ==
- Osaka Seikei University, despite naming, has no ties with the institution.
- Love Live!, university was used as a setting of Otonokizaka High School
