= Miss Korea 2008 =

- Date: July 8, 2008
- Venue: Sejong Center, Seoul, South Korea
- Entrants: 51
- Winner: Na Ree; Seoul Seon

52nd Miss Korea 2008 was a beauty pageant held on July 8, 2008, at Sejong Center, sponsored by the Korean newspaper Hankook Ilbo. Approximately 51 women from around the world competed in Seoul, South Korea and seven were selected by a panel of judges. The first-place winner was Na Ree, crowned by the official last year winner Lee Ji-sun. Na Ree was to compete at Miss Universe 2009 in the Bahamas.

== Results ==
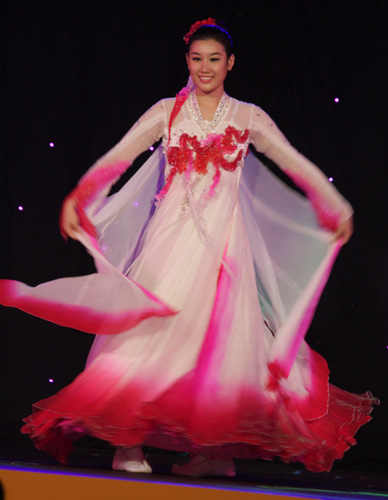
2008 Miss Korea Seon Choi Bo-In.

=== Placements ===
Placement	Contestant
Miss Korea Jin/Miss Korea 2008	Na Ree
Miss Korea Seon/1st Runner-Up	Choi Bo-in
Miss Korea Seon/2nd Runner-Up	Kim Min-jeong
Miss Korea Mi Jin Air/3rd Runner-Up	Chang Yun hee
Miss Korea Mi Natural F&P/4th Runner-Up	Seo Seol-hee
Miss Korea Mi/5th Runner-Up	Lee Yun-ah
