= Sayuki Ito =

Japanese beauty pageant titleholder

- 伊藤 さゆき
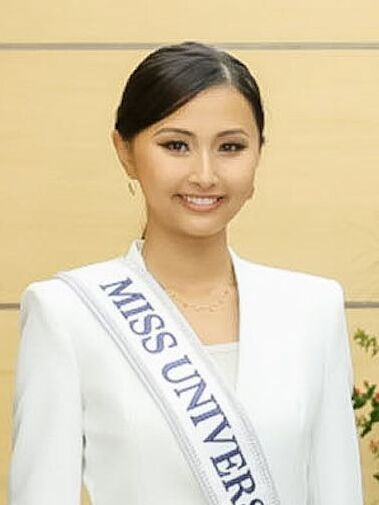
- Ito in 2026
- Born: July 24, 1999 (age 27); Yamaguchi Prefecture, Japan
- Height: 1.71 m (5 ft 7 in)
- Beauty pageant titleholder
- Title: Miss Universe Japan 2026
- Major competitions: Miss Universe Japan 2026; (Winner); Miss Universe 2026; (TBD)

Sayuki Ito (Japanese: 伊藤 さゆき, born July 24, 1999) is a Japanese beauty pageant titleholder who won Miss Universe Japan 2026. She will represent Japan at Miss Universe 2026 in San Juan, Puerto Rico.

== Early life ==
Sayuki Ito was born on July 24, 1999, in Shimonoseki, Yamaguchi Prefecture, Japan. She later relocated to Fukuoka Prefecture. Her personal interests and activities include visiting traditional Shinto shrines and practicing standup paddleboarding. She has Korean descent through her grandmother.

== Pageantry ==
Ito represented Fukuoka prefecture and won Miss Universe Japan 2026, on June 23, 2026, at the Owada Sakura Hall in the Shibuya City Cultural Center, Tokyo. She was crowned by the national organization director Hiroko Mima. As the national titleholder, she will represent Japan at Miss Universe 2026, in November 2026 at the José Miguel Agrelot Coliseum in San Juan, Puerto Rico.

Awards and achievements
Preceded by Kaori Hashimoto	Miss Universe Japan; 2026	Incumbent
