= Miss Universe Japan 2015 =

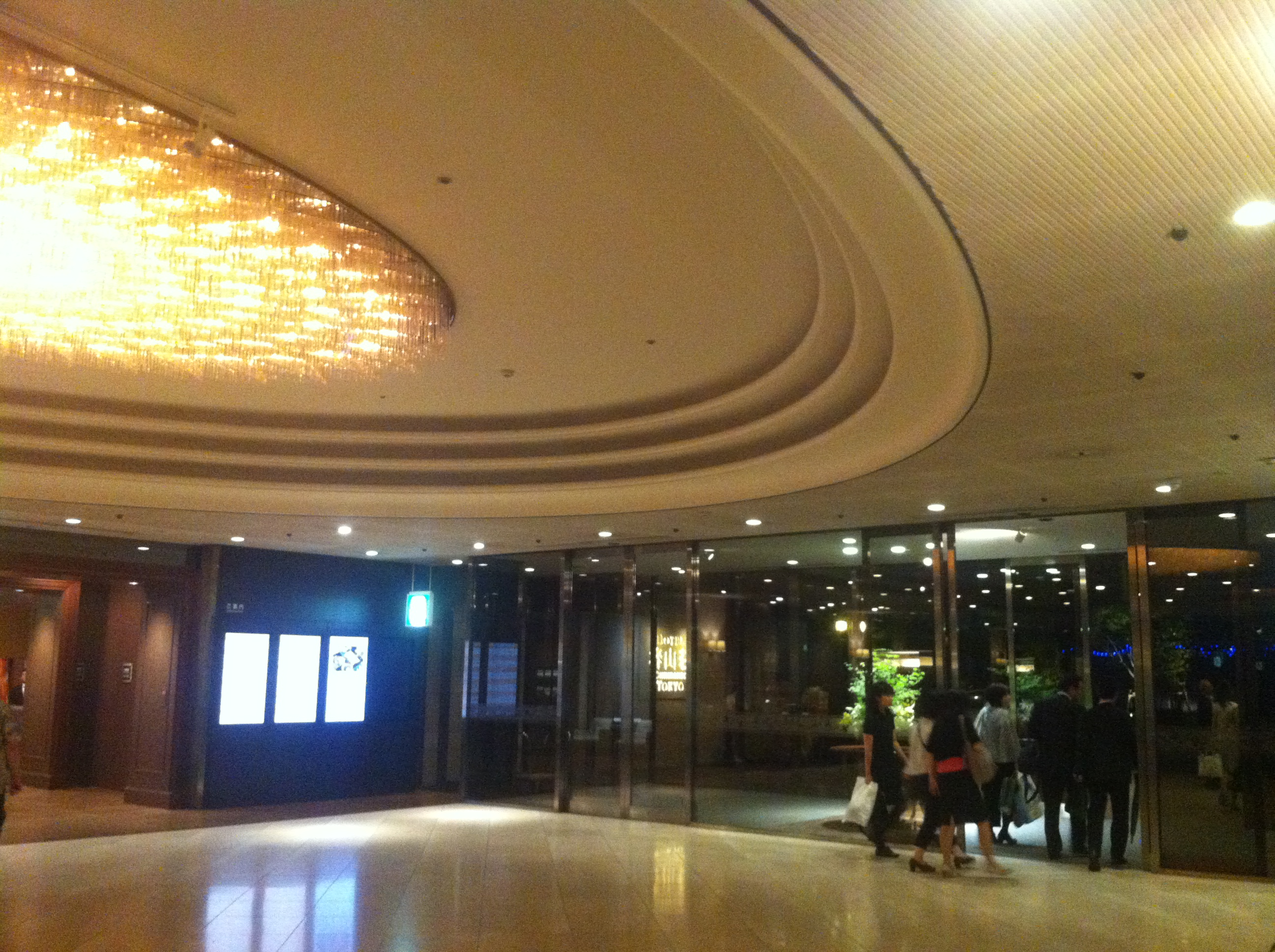
- Date: March 12, 2015
- Venue: Hotel Chinzanso Tokyo, Bunkyō, Tokyo, Japan
- Entrants: 47
- Placements: 16
- Winner: Ariana Miyamoto (Nagasaki)

Miss Universe Japan 2015 (Japanese: 2015 ミス・ユニバース・ジャパン) was the Miss Universe Japan pageant, held at the Hotel Chinzanso Tokyo in Bunkyō-ku, Tokyo, Japan, on March 12, 2015.

Keiko Tsuji of Nagasaki crowned Ariana Miyamoto of Nagasaki as her successor at the end of the event.

== Results ==
=== Placements ===
Placement	Contestant
Miss Universe Japan 2015	Nagasaki – Ariana Miyamoto
1st Runner-Up	Oita – Rina Inoko
2nd Runner-Up	Chiba – Hikaru Tsuchiya
3rd Runner-Up	Aichi – Mao Kaneko
4th Runner-Up	Tokyo – Tamao Tada
Top 10	Ehime – Akane Takase; Fukushima – Rikako Maebayashi; Gifu – Saya Honno; Iwate – Sakiko Tomita; Kagawa – Minori Miyaguchi
Top 16	Kanagawa – Ayaka Yamaoka; Kyoto – Mayuko Fujiwara; Miyagi – Risa Shoji; Miyazaki – Nami Shimada; Toyama – Rina Hirata; Yamanashi – Eri Natori

== Contestants ==
47 contestants participated:

Prefecture	Contestant
Aichi	Mao Kaneko
Akita	Shiori Nara
Aomori	Manami Takano
Chiba	Hikaru Tsuchiya
Ehime	Akane Takase
Fukui	Yuuka Hoshino
Fukuoka	Wakaba Suda
Fukushima	Rikako Maebayashi
Gifu	Saya Honno
Gunma	Ayaka Ishikubo
Hiroshima	Remi Nagamoto
Hokkaido	Risako Oomura
Hyogo	Emiko Kanou
Ibaraki	Yoko Nishino
Ishikawa	Ai Higashide
Iwate	Sakiko Tomita
Kagawa	Minori Miyaguchi
Kagoshima	Yu Takeyama
Kanagawa	Ayaka Yamaoka
Kochi	Reiko Watanabe
Kumamoto	Airi Yukawa
Kyoto	Mayuko Fujiwara
Mie	Yuki Kusano
Miyagi	Risa Shoji
Miyazaki	Nami Shimada
Nagano	Saki Ichinose
Nagasaki	Ariana Miyamoto
Nara	Naoko Fukunaga
Niigata	Marie Izumi
Oita	Rina Inoko
Okayama	Chika Takeda
Okinawa	Akari Oda
Osaka	Yuka Morikawa
Saga	Yoshiko Okuzono
Saitama	Risa Shimogawara
Shiga	Miyu Tanaka
Shimane	Yukari Yumen
Shizuoka	Serina Shibayama
Tochigi	Erika Koyama
Tokushima	Shizuka Komori
Tokyo	Tamao Tada
Tottori	Rika Watanabe
Toyama	Rina Hirata
Wakayama	Yuki Morita
Yamagata	Chiemi Yamazaki
Yamaguchi	Suzuyo Okamoto
Yamanashi	Eri Natori
