= Maiko Itai =

Japanese beauty pageant contestant (born 1984)

- Born: Maiko Itai; 21 May 1984 (age 42); Ōita Prefecture, Japan
- Beauty pageant titleholder
- Title: Miss Universe Japan 2010
- Major competitions: Miss Universe Japan 2010 (Winner); Miss Universe 2010 (Unplaced)

Maiko Itai (板井 麻衣子, Itai Maiko; born 21 May 1984 in Ōita Prefecture) is a Japanese model and beauty pageant titleholder who won Miss Universe Japan 2010 on 9 March 2010. Itai, the 13th Miss Universe Japan, accepted the crown from Emiri Miyasaka, Miss Universe Japan 2009.

She competed in Miss Universe 2010 in Las Vegas, but was unplaced.

== History ==
Maiko is an alumna of Aveiro University, Portugal, where she studied English and Portuguese languages.

Awards and achievements
Preceded by Emiri Miyasaka	Miss Universe Japan; 2010	Succeeded by Maria Kamiyama
