= Ayako Hara =

- 原 綾子
- Born: Ayako Hara; 24 March 1988 (age 38); Sendai, Miyagi Prefecture, Japan
- Height: 1.70 m (5 ft 7 in)
- Beauty pageant titleholder
- Title: Miss Universe Japan 2012
- Hair color: Black
- Major competitions: Miss Universe Japan 2012 (Winner); Miss Universe 2012 (Unplaced)

Ayako Hara (原 綾子, Hara Ayako; born 24 March 1988) is a Japanese model, beauty pageant titleholder, and businesswoman who won Miss Universe Japan 2012. Born and raised in Sendai, she actively engaged in disaster recovery initiatives following the 2011 Tōhoku earthquake and tsunami and represented Japan at the Miss Universe 2012 competition in Las Vegas. Following her pageant tenure, Hara established the consultancy AH'S INTERNATIONAL Inc., published fitness literature, and produced youth community fashion projects in disaster-affected Onagawa, Miyagi.

== Early life and athletic background ==
Hara was born and raised in Sendai, Miyagi Prefecture, in a mountainous rural district bordering Yamagata Prefecture. Encouraged by her mother after showing an early aptitude for sports, she practiced artistic gymnastics throughout elementary school.

During secondary education, Hara competed in soft tennis. In her second year of high school, intense training resulted in severe tennis elbow that temporarily prevented her from holding a racket or pen. After undergoing treatment, she returned to competition in her third year and qualified for the national Inter-High school athletic championships.

== Pre-pageant career and 2011 earthquake ==
Following high school graduation, Hara worked at a hotel in Sendai for two years. While seeking a new vocation, she watched a television documentary detailing the training sessions at the Miss Universe Japan Beauty Camp. Inspired by the contestants' discipline, she formulated a three-year self-directed preparation schedule aimed at entering the 2012 national competition.

To develop runway walking and posture techniques, Hara analyzed online video footage of international titleholders. In December 2010, she moved from Sendai to Tokyo, where she directly approached modeling agencies to secure studio space and professional representation.

Four months after her relocation, the Great East Japan Earthquake struck her home region on 11 March 2011, causing half-destruction to her family home in Sendai. Returning to Sendai in April 2011 to assist with rubble clearing, she sought ways to contribute to recovery efforts. Between July and October 2011, she organized monthly charity children's fashion shows in Tokyo, combining runway performances with sales of Miyagi regional agricultural goods to raise relief funds.

== Pageantry ==
=== Miss Universe Japan 2012 ===
On 1 April 2012, Hara competed in the Miss Universe Japan 2012 final held at the Osaka International Convention Center in Osaka. She was selected as the winner from 23 regional finalists who had advanced from an initial applicant pool of approximately 4,000 entrants nationwide. Standing 1.70 m (5 ft 7 in) tall, Hara focused her final speech on self-expression and authenticity. In her acceptance address, she dedicated her victory to the recovery of the Tohoku region and pledged to use the international platform to appeal for global disaster relief support.

=== Miss Universe 2012 ===
On 5 November 2012, an official send-off ceremony was held for Hara at Happo-en in Shirokanedai, Tokyo. At the event, she unveiled her national costume for the world pageant, a "Samurai Blue" furisode-style dress accented with floral motifs and red detailing.

Hara represented Japan at the Miss Universe 2012 pageant, held on 19 December 2012 at the Planet Hollywood Resort and Casino in Las Vegas, Nevada. She did not advance to the top 16 placement round, with the title won by Olivia Culpo of the United States.

== Modeling and business career ==
=== Commercial endorsements and publications ===
In April 2012, Hara served as a special promotional supporter for the Sendai-set feature film Potechi (directed by Yoshihiro Nakamura), appearing at its Tokyo preview screening to advocate for her hometown and regional recovery.

In May 2012, Reckitt Benckiser Japan launched a television advertising campaign for its Dr. Scholl Deo-Activ foot care line featuring Hara alongside fellow national pageant finalists.

On 10 September 2012, publisher Wani Books released the commercial health and fitness book Dr. Scholl-shiki Panther bikyaku daietto (ISBN 978-4-8470-9101-8), featuring Hara as the cover model and practical exercise practitioner alongside health consultant Izumi Yamamichi and model Emi Kaneko. She attended the Tokyo publication event alongside Yamamichi and Kaneko to demonstrate exercise routines ahead of her appearance at the Miss Universe pageant.

In September 2013, Hara headlined an ethical fashion runway presentation during the launch reception for the lifestyle publication ethica in Tokyo, modeling garments made from domestic Japanese vegetable-tanned leather.

=== AH'S INTERNATIONAL and beauty coaching ===
Following the conclusion of her two-year tenure as Miss Universe Japan, Hara founded AH'S INTERNATIONAL Inc. in 2014. Through the company, she established an instructional program termed "Intelligence Beauty" (知のある美, Chi no aru bi), which combines physical posture and presentation coaching with personalized counseling and DNA nutritional analysis.

== Philanthropy and community engagement ==
Beginning in 2013, Hara shifted her charity fashion show initiatives directly to Onagawa, Miyagi, a coastal community that had experienced catastrophic tsunami destruction in 2011. Serving as general producer of the project, she organized outdoor runway events titled the "ONAGAWA FASHION SHOW", bringing local children and youth together to foster self-confidence and community revitalization through performing arts.

== Bibliography ==
- Hara, Ayako (September 2012). Dr. Scholl-shiki Panther bikyaku daietto: 100-man nin no ashi o hikishimeru ashi no senmon burando [Dr. Scholl Method Panther Beautiful Legs Diet: The Foot Care Specialist Brand That Tones One Million Legs]. Bijin Kaika Series (in Japanese). Wani Books. ISBN 978-4-8470-9101-8.

Awards and achievements
Preceded by Maria Kamiyama	Miss Universe Japan; 2012	Succeeded by Yukimi Matsuo
