= Kurara Chibana =

Miss Universe Japan 2006

- Born: Kurara Chibana; March 27, 1982 (age 44); Naha, Okinawa, Japan
- Education: Sophia University
- Height: 5 ft 8 in (173 cm)
- Spouse: Ryuji Kamiyama (m. 2017)
- Children: 2
- Beauty pageant titleholder
- Title: Miss Universe Japan 2006
- Hair color: Black
- Eye color: Brown
- Major competitions: Miss Universe Japan 2006 (Winner); Miss Universe 2006 (1st Runner-Up); (Best National Costume)

Kurara Chibana (知花 くらら, Chibana Kurara) is a Japanese actress, model, tv host and beauty pageant titleholder who was crowned Miss Universe Japan 2006 and competed at Miss Universe 2006 where she finished as the first runner-up.

== Miss Universe 2006 ==
Chibana participated in Miss Universe 2006 where she represented Japan. She won the Best National Costume Award for her samurai-themed outfit designed by the artist Yuichi Miyagawa and the designer Yoshiyuki Ogata, and was the first runner-up. During the final, Chibana wore a black evening gown exhibiting intricate latticework designed by Olivier Theyskens for Rochas, and at the preliminaries, Chibana sported a unique red and pink-hued gown with silver corseting designed by Novespazio.

== Personal information ==
Chibana was an educational-philosophy student at Sophia University. She got her Bachelor of Arts degree in 2006. She turned down a job offer from a publishing company in order to compete in the Miss Universe Japan pageant, which was held on April 25, 2006, in Tokyo. Kurara now works as a feature reporter, flying around the world to interview people for a leading fashion magazine in Japan. She writes and takes photos of their lifestyles. She speaks four languages: English, Spanish, French, and Japanese.

Since October 2006, she has appeared regularly on the Nippon Television show "News Zero", reporting from both domestic and international locations, and launched her endorsement career as a spokesperson for more than four world-famous brands in 2007. She is the spokeswoman for Maybelline New York's Angelfit Make-Up. In late December, Global Beauties named Kurara as the Sexiest Woman Alive 2006, a title formerly held by Miyako Miyazaki.

In December 2013, Chibana was elected as the Japanese Ambassador for United Nations World Food Program for her contributions to the organization as a celebrity partner.

In October 2017, Chibana announced that she had married Ryuji Kamiyama. They have 2 daughters.

Awards and achievements
Preceded by (Puerto Rico) Cynthia Olavarría	Miss Universe 1st Runner-Up; 2006	Succeeded by (Brazil) Natália Guimarães
Preceded by Yukari Kuzuya	Miss Universe Japan; 2006	Succeeded by Riyo Mori
