= Choi Bo-in =

South Korean model

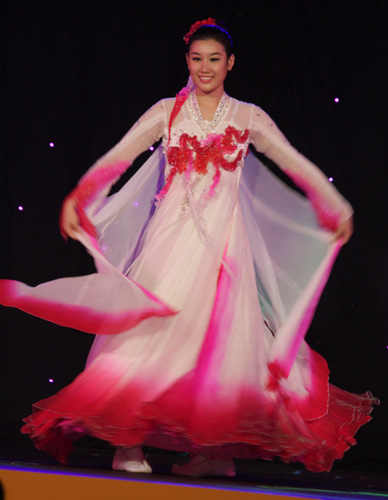
- Born: July 12, 1986 (age 40); Seoul, South Korea
- Beauty pageant titleholder
- Title: Miss Korea 2008

Choi Bo-in is a South Korean model and beauty pageant titleholder who represented her country at Miss World 2008 in South Africa. She studied international studies at the Ewha Womans University.
