= Rio Miyazaki =

Japanese model (born 2003)

- Born: 17 October 2003 (age 22); Shizuoka Prefecture, Japan
- Occupation: Model
- Height: 1.73 m (5 ft 8 in)
- Beauty pageant titleholder
- Title: Miss Universe Japan 2023
- Major competitions: Miss Universe Japan 2023 (Winner); Miss Universe 2023 (Unplaced)

Rio Miyazaki (宮崎 莉緒, Miyazaki Rio; born 17 October 2003) is a Japanese advocate, cheerleader, model and beauty pageant titleholder who was crowned Miss Universe Japan 2023 and represented Japan at Miss Universe 2023 in El Salvador.

== Background ==
=== Early life ===
Miyazaki was born on 17 October 2003, in Shizuoka, a prefecture of Japan located in the Chūbu region of Honshu. She is taking up childhood education at Kyoritsu Women's University in Shizuoka Prefecture.

== Pageantry ==
=== Miss Universe 2023 ===
Miyazaki represented Japan with the national flag at The 72nd Miss Universe 2023 in El Salvador at the pageant venue Adolfo Pineda National Gymnasium (Gimnasio Nacional Adolfo Pineda) on Saturday November 18, 2023 where the reigning Miss Universe 2022, R'Bonney Gabriel will crown her successor at the end of Grand Finale.

Awards and achievements
Preceded by Marybelén Sakamoto	Miss Universe Japan; 2023	Succeeded by Kaya Chakrabortty
