= Ariana Miyamoto =

Japanese model (born 1994)

- 宮本エリアナ
- Born: Ariana Mamiko Miyamoto; 12 May 1994 (age 32); Sasebo, Nagasaki, Japan
- Height: 5 ft 8 in (1.73 m)
- Spouse: Unknown (m. 2017; div. 2022)
- Children: 2
- Beauty pageant titleholder
- Title: Miss Universe Japan 2015
- Hair color: Black
- Eye color: Brown
- Major competitions: Miss Universe Japan 2015 (Winner); Miss Universe 2015 (Top 10)

Ariana Mamiko Miyamoto (宮本・エリアナ・磨美子, Miyamoto Eriana Mamiko; born 12 May 1994) is a Japanese model and beauty pageant titleholder who was crowned Miss Universe Japan 2015. She represented Japan at the Miss Universe 2015 pageant and placed in the Top 10. In 2015 she became the first hāfu or multiracial woman to be Miss Japan.

== Early life ==
Miyamoto was born to a Japanese mother and African American father, Bryant Stanfield, who was stationed at the United States Navy facility in Sasebo. Miyamoto's parents divorced when she was one year old. She attended elementary school in Japan and, at age 13, immigrated to the United States to live with her father in Jacksonville, Arkansas, where she attended Jacksonville High School for two years. Upon return to her native Japan, she did not immediately complete high school, but worked odd jobs, including as a bartender.

In 2015, Miyamoto won the title of Miss Nagasaki and represented her prefecture at the Miss Universe Japan contest.

== Career ==
=== Miss Universe Japan 2015 ===
On 12 March 2015, Miyamoto was crowned as Miss Universe Japan 2015 (Miss Japan 2015) at Hotel Chinzanso Tokyo in Bunkyō-ku, while Miss Oita and Miss Chiba were runner-ups. As Miss Japan 2015, she represented Japan at Miss Universe 2015 and made it to Top 10.

=== Miss Universe 2015 ===
As Miss Japan 2015, Miyamoto competed at the Miss Universe 2015 pageant where she made it to the Top 10. Before Miyamoto's placement, Japan last placed in the top 15 seven years prior in 2008 with Hiroko Mima.

== Personal life ==
On 1 December 2017, Miyamoto married her husband, who is from Hong Kong, and later announced her first pregnancy. On 26 December 2020, she posted a video on YouTube indicating she was nine months pregnant with her second child. On 29 April 2021, she posted an update on the birth of her second child on YouTube, saying she had given birth to her second son. The couple divorced in 2022.

In August 2017, Miyamoto was appointed the honorary ambassador of tourism for the city of Sasebo in Nagasaki Prefecture, her hometown, and the city that hosts the US Naval base her father was stationed in.

=== Discrimination ===
Miyamoto recalled, "Whenever the teacher told us to hold hands, other children thought my black skin would rub off on them, so they said, 'Don't touch me'". Some of her classmates in Sasebo, Nagasaki would say things like, "Don't swim in the same pool 'cause your skin will rub off on me." Miyamoto was shunned due to her skin color and wavy hair while she grew up in Japan. Parents and classmates used the term kurombo (a racist expression) to refer to her. She also recalls people throwing garbage at her in school. One of Miyamoto's friends, a fellow hāfu, committed suicide after sharing his experiences of social exclusion with her.

After her victory, she encountered some people disapproving of her win, mostly in the form of online social media. This was attributed to ethnicity, as she is not fully Japanese ethnically, and her physical appearance. Some said she looked like too "foreign" (gaijin), and another felt she had "too much black blood [in her] to be Japanese." She is the first hāfu (mixed) woman to be Miss Japan. Following her win, Miyamoto had to explain to the Japanese media that she was a Japanese citizen, born and raised in the country.

Awards and achievements
Preceded by Keiko Tsuji	Miss Universe Japan; 2015	Succeeded by Sari Nakazawa
