= Yukimi Matsuo =

Japanese beauty pageant titleholder (born 1987)

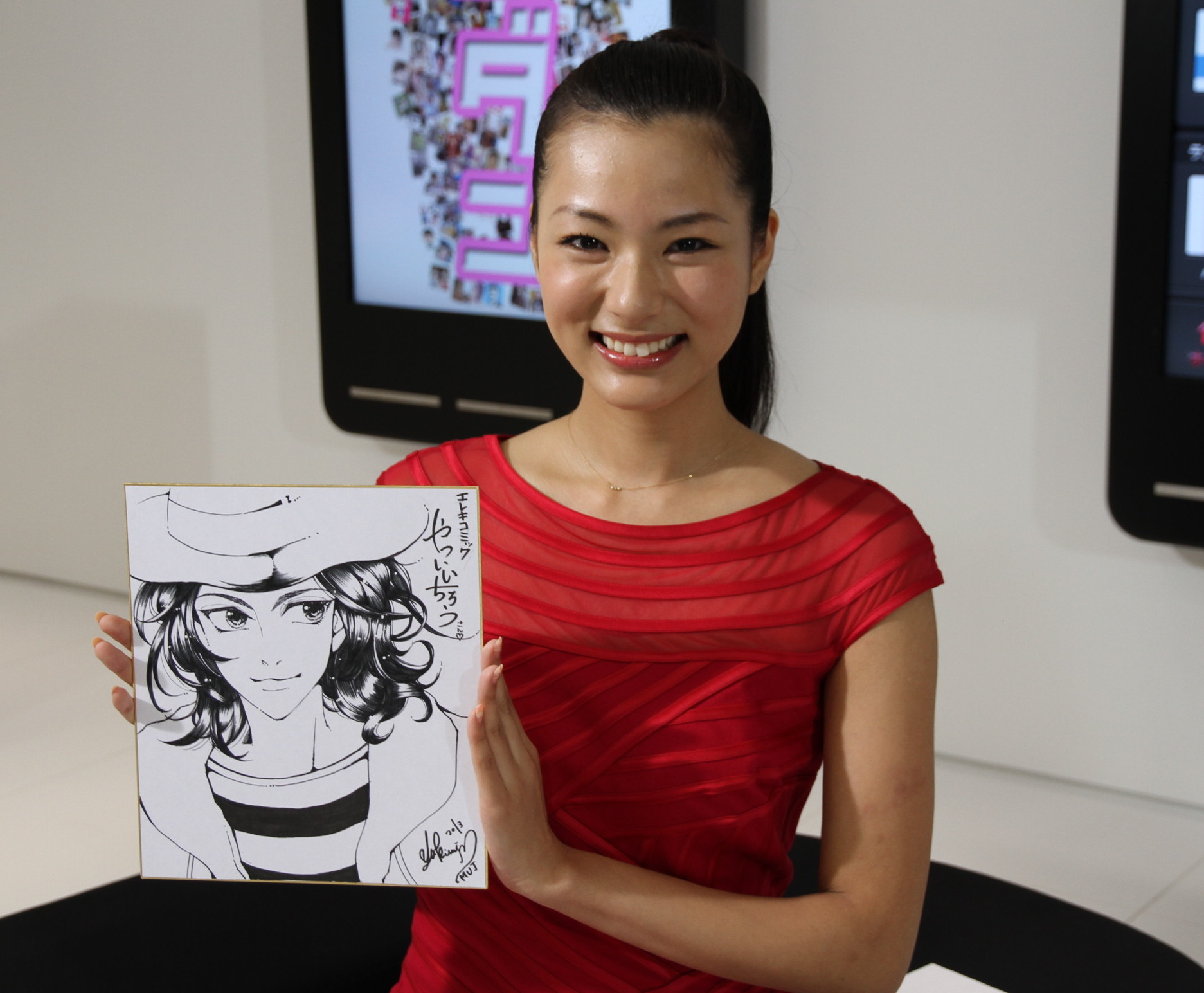
- Born: Yukimi Matsuo; October 20, 1987 (age 38); Mie Prefecture, Japan
- Height: 1.73 m (5 ft 8 in)
- Beauty pageant titleholder
- Title: Miss Universe Japan 2013
- Hair color: Black
- Major competitions: Miss Universe Japan 2013 (Winner); Miss Universe 2013 (Unplaced)

Yukimi Matsuo (松尾 幸実, Matsuo Yukimi; born October 20, 1987) is a Japanese actress, model and beauty pageant titleholder who was crowned Miss Universe Japan 2013 and represented Japan in Miss Universe 2013.

== Early life ==
Matsuo is a passionate manga artist.

== Miss Universe Japan 2013 ==
Yukimi Matsuo was crowned Miss Universe Japan 2013 at the 16th Miss Universe Japan beauty contest. She was crowned by Ayako Hara (the Miss Universe Japan 2012 Winner). The Miss Universe Japan 2013 beauty contest took place at the Tokyo International Forum Hall on grand coronation night of Monday, 4 March 2013. The MUJ 2013 competition was televised live on the "MUJTV". Yukimi Matsuo represented Japan at the Miss Universe 2013 beauty contest at the 62nd Miss Universe beauty contest.

Awards and achievements
Preceded by Ayako Hara	Miss Universe Japan; 2013	Succeeded by Keiko Tsuji
