= Aisha Harumi Tochigi =

Japanese model

- Born: 4 January 1996 (age 30); Chiba, Japan
- Beauty pageant titleholder
- Title: Miss Universe Japan 2020
- Hair color: Black
- Eye color: Brown
- Major competitions: Miss Universe Japan 2019; (Top 5); Miss Universe Japan 2020; (Winner); Miss Universe 2020; (Unplaced)

Aisha Harumi Tochigi (杤木 愛シャ 暖望, born January 4, 1996) is a Japanese model and beauty pageant titleholder who was crowned Miss Universe Japan 2020. She was born in Japan to a Ghanaian father and a Japanese mother.

== Early life ==
She spent her childhood in Ghana from the age of 10 to 17, before returning to Japan. She graduated from Dokkyo University and is fluent in both Japanese and English.

== Career ==
Tochigi competed in the Miss Universe Japan pageant twice. In 2019, she represented Chiba and finished in the top 5. Then in 2020, she won the Miss Universe Japan National crown. She went on to represent Japan in the Miss Universe 2020 competition, but did not make it to the top 21.
