= Kaya Chakrabortty =

2024 Miss Universe Japan winner

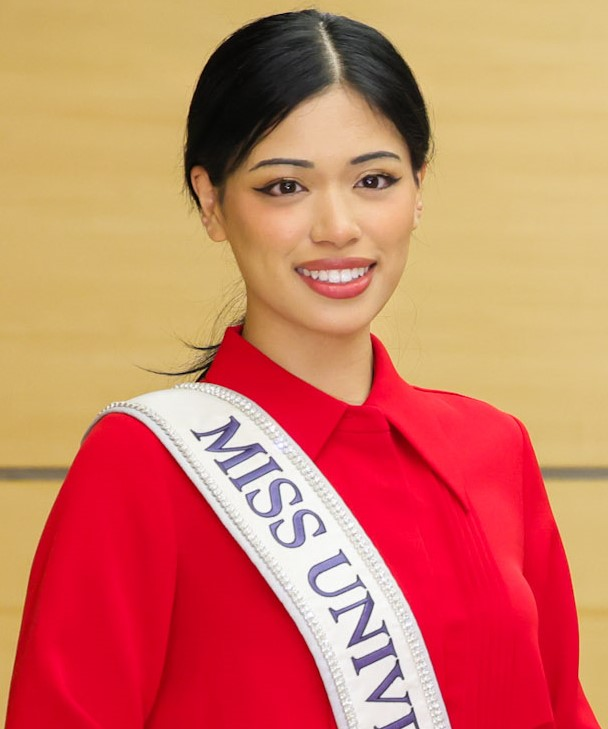
- Chakrabortty in 2025
- Born: August 6, 2001 (age 24); Detroit, Michigan
- Education: Michigan State University (BSc in Human Biology and Neuroscience)
- Known for: Miss Universe Japan 2024 (Winner); Miss Universe 2024 (Top 30)
- Height: 1.68 m (5 ft 6 in)

Kaya Chakrabortty (Japanese: チャクラボルティ雅, Hepburn: Chakuraboruti Kaya; born August 6, 2001) is a Japanese beauty pageant titleholder who won Miss Universe Japan 2024. She represented Japan at the Miss Universe 2024 pageant in Mexico, where she placed as a Top 30 semi-finalist.

== Early life and education ==
Kaya Chakrabortty was born in Detroit Michigan, USA, to a Japanese mother and a Bangladeshi father. She is fluent in multiple languages, including Japanese, English, Spanish, and Korean. She attended Michigan State University, where she graduated in 2024 with a double degree in Human Biology and Neuroscience and a minor in Japanese. During her high school years, she was a competitive figure skater, winning the U.S. high school national championship twice.

== Career ==
In 2024, Kaya Chakrabortty won Miss Universe Japan, becoming the first biracial winner with Bangladeshi heritage. The selection event was held on July 25, 2024, at Yamano Hall in Tokyo.

== Volunteer work and advocacy ==
Chakrabortty's voluntary work, includes emergency rescue and shelter cooking. She is a certified EMT and has been active in various humanitarian efforts for approximately 15 years. She advocates for children's health and language education, currently teaching English to Japanese students in Japan, aiming to inspire and empower the younger generation.

== Professional experience ==
Chakrabortty has worked as a medical scribe, and as a research fellow at the Detroit Medical Center, where she focused on studies related to anaesthesia and multilingual publications. Chakrabortty has also worked as a private figure skating coach and volunteered as a dinner prep volunteer at Haven House.

== Awards and recognition ==
- Miss Universe Japan 2024
- U.S. Figure Skating Senior High School National Champion (2019)
- Michigan High School Team Figure Skating Champion (2019)
- U.S. Figure Skating Senior High School National Champion (2018)
- Michigan High School Team Figure Skating Champion (2018)
- Michigan High School Team Figure Skating Champion (2017)
- Michigan High School Team Figure Skating Champion (2016)
- Michigan High School Team Figure Skating Champion (2015)

Awards and achievements
Preceded by Rio Miyazaki	Miss Universe Japan; 2024	Succeeded by Kaori Hashimoto
