= Emiri Miyasaka =

Japanese model (born 1984)

- Miyasaka in 2009
- Born: June 16, 1984 (age 42); Tokyo, Japan
- Height: 1.71 m (5 ft 7 1/2 in)
- Spouse: Unknown (m. 2017)
- Children: 2
- Beauty pageant titleholder
- Title: Miss Universe Japan 2009
- Hair color: Brown
- Eye color: Brown
- Major competitions: Miss International Japan 2008 (2nd runner-up); Miss Universe 2009 (Unplaced)

Emiri Miyasaka (宮坂 絵美里, Miyasaka Emiri) (born June 16, 1984) is a Japanese actress, model, dancer and beauty pageant titleholder. She competed in the Miss Universe 2009 pageant on August 23, 2009, held in the Bahamas.

== Miss Universe Japan 2009 ==
Miyasaka beat more than 3,000 applicants for the title of Miss Universe Japan.

=== Controversies ===
Miyasaka's revealing national costume triggered backlash from Japanese critics, claiming the costume was "a national disgrace", "made fun of Japanese traditional clothing and culture", and was "a stupidly designed stupid costume for a stupid person to wear". The costume was designed by Yoshiyuki Ogata for the Yoshiyuki brand, along with Japan's Miss Universe franchise holder and director Ligron. Originally, the skirt was longer, but Ligron decided to shorten it in a hasty decision taken before the press conference. After the uproar, Ligron defended the costume, saying that the critics were "dinosaurs". Nonetheless, Miyasaka wore a more conservative version of the design at the actual pageant.

== Personal life ==
On December 29, 2017, Miyasaka announces her marriage to an unspecified man. They have two children.

Preceded by Hiroko Mima	Miss Universe Japan; 2009	Succeeded by Maiko Itai
