= Miss Universe Japan 2019 =

Beauty pageant edition

- Date: August 22, 2019
- Venue: Yamano Beauty College, Yoyogi, Shibuya-ku, Japan
- Entrants: 40
- Placements: 16
- Winner: Ako Kamo; Hyōgo

Miss Universe Japan 2019 (Japanese: 2019 ミス・ユニバース・ジャパン) was the 22nd edition of Miss Universe Japan that was held on August 22, 2019. Yuumi Kato of Mie Prefecture crowned Ako Kamo of Hyōgo Prefecture as her successor at the end of the event.

== Results ==
=== Placements ===
| Final results | Contestant |
|---|---|
| Miss Universe Japan 2019 | Hyōgo - Ako Kamo |
| Top 5 | Aichi - Runa Matsui; Chiba - Aisha Harumi Tochigi; Fukuoka - Sakurako Fujino; Fukuoka - Yu Harada |
| Top 16 | Aichi - Hinako Masui; Fukuoka - Aiki Nakajo; Hiroshima - Risa Takekara; Ibaraki - Manomi Nemoto; Ishikawa - Misato Ishizaki; Kanagawa - Megumi Watanobe; Kanagawa - Reyna Ozawa; Nagasaki - Yuri Kaji; Okinawa - Misaki Komine; Shizuoka - Mariko Kaji; Yamanashi - Chiaki Shimoyama |

=== Special awards ===
| Award | Contestant |
|---|---|
| Miss Congeniality | Hokkaido – Yuh Sarah Datwani |
| DUO Award | Osaka – Manaka Oyama |

== Contestants ==
| Contestant | Prefecture |
|---|---|
| Mariko Kaji | Shizuoka |
| Keiko Haraguchi | |
| Hinako Masui | Aichi |
| Rie Kitamura | |
| Chiaki Shimoyama | Yamanashi |
| Yu Harada | Fukuoka |
| Megu Nakahara | |
| Yuri Kaji | Nagasaki |
| Hoshika Maekawa | |
| Luna Ikeda | |
| Emiri Shimizu | |
| Mizuki Ohnishi | |
| Misato Ishizaki | Ishikawa |
| Tamae Honma | |
| Karen Furukawa | |
| Reyna Ozawa | Kanagawa |
| Natsumi Ueda | |
| Manaka Oyama | Osaka |
| Ako Kamo | Hyōgo |
| Manomi Nemoto | Ibaraki |
| Yuki Matoba | |
| Marina Petrova Tanaka | |
| Yano Kawa | |
| Aisha Harumi Tochigi | Chiba |
| Mari Mizuguchi | |
| Mie Otani | |
| Risa Takekara | Hiroshima |
| Kumi Miyamae | |
| Saori Okubo | |
| Yuho Otomo | |
| Sakurako Fujino | Fukuoka |
| Megumi Watanobe | Kanagawa |
| Aiki Nakajo | Fukuoka |
| Yuh Sarah Datwani | Hokkaido |
| Misaki Komine | Okinawa |
| Mikako Muramatsu | |
| Sara Kawamura | |
| Marie Ogawa | |
