= Na Ry =

South Korean Artist and model

- Born: December 13, 1985 (age 40); Seoul, South Korea
- Height: 1.68 m (5 ft 6 in)
- Beauty pageant titleholder
- Title: Miss Korea 2008
- Hair color: Black
- Eye color: Black
- Major competition: Miss Korea 2008 (winner)

- Na Ry
- Hangul: 나리
- RR: Na Ri
- MR: Na Ri

Na Ry (Korean: 나리 born December 13, 1985) is a South Korean artist, model and beauty pageant titleholder who the winner of Miss Korea 2008 which was held in Seoul's Sejong Center for the Performing Arts. She represented Korea in the 2009 Miss Universe pageant. When she won Miss Korea 2008, Na Ry was studying applied statistics at Yonsei University. She plays the violin and enjoys pilates.

Awards and achievements
Preceded by Lee Ji-seon	Miss Korea; 2008	Succeeded by Kim Joo-ri
