= Jinseon Girls' High School =

South Korea private high school

- 진선여자고등학교
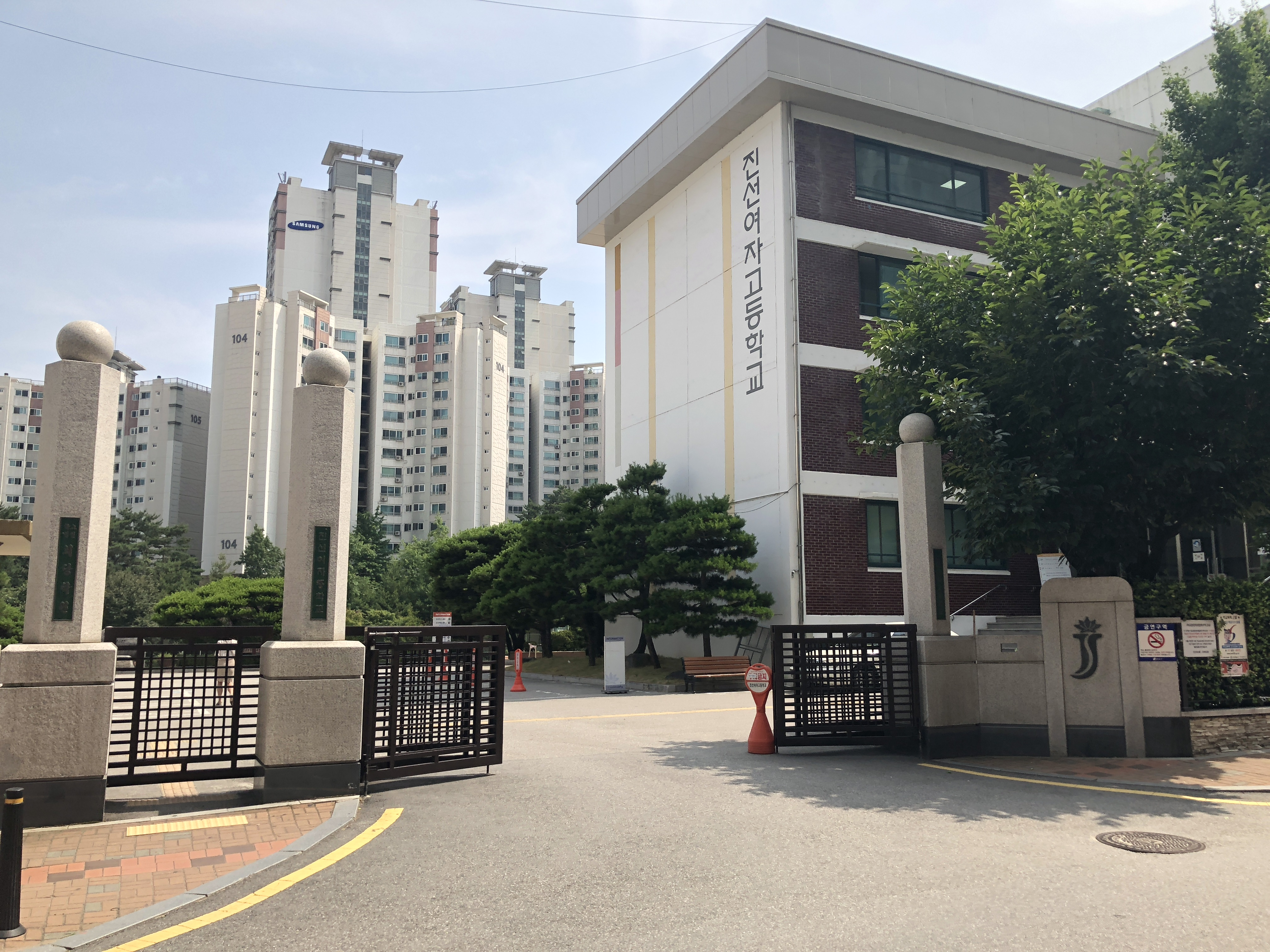

Location
- 27 Seolleung-ro 85-gil, Gangnam-gu; Seoul; South Korea; 37°30′6.552″N 127°2′49.0776″E

Information
- Type: Private
- Motto: Be true and a good man (Korean: 참되고 착한 사람이 되자)
- Established: 1976
- Principal: Bang Gun-hee (Korean: 방건희)
- Gender: Girls
- Website: jinseon.sen.hs.kr

Korean name
- Hangul: 진선여자고등학교
- Hanja: 眞善女子高等學校
- RR: Jinseon yeoja godeunghakgyo
- MR: Chinsŏn yŏja kodŭnghakkyo

Jinseon Girls' High School (Korean: 진선여자고등학교) is a private girls high school located in Gangnam-gu, Seoul, South Korea.

In 2008, it was selected as an excellent environmental education school. In 2009, the school was operated as a regular essay base school by the Seoul Metropolitan Office of Education with easy access and pleasant classroom environment. In addition, it was selected as an excellent school for the 2009 education evaluation curriculum.

The motto is "Be true and a good man". The symbol tree is bodhi tree and the symbol flower is lotus. It is composed of 32 classes in 3 grades. Club activities include Buddhist student councils, girl scouts, theater departments, broadcasting classes, and chamber orchestra classes.

== Notable alumni ==
- Lee Se-eun (born 1980), South Korean actress
- Jun Ji-hyun (born 1981), South Korean actress
- Lee Ji-seon (born 1983), South Korean fashion designer and Miss Korea in 2007
- Hwang Bo-ra (born 1983), South Korean actress
- Bang Min-ah (born 1993), South Korean singer and actress
- Siyeon (born 1995), South Korean singer (Dreamcatcher)
- Dami (born 1997), South Korean Rapper (Dreamcatcher)
- Uchae (born 2002), South Korean singer Nature (group)

== See also ==
- Education in South Korea
- Jinseon Girls' High School (Korean)
- Jinseon Girls' High School Alumni (Korean)
