= Maria Kamiyama =

Japanese model and Miss Universe contestant

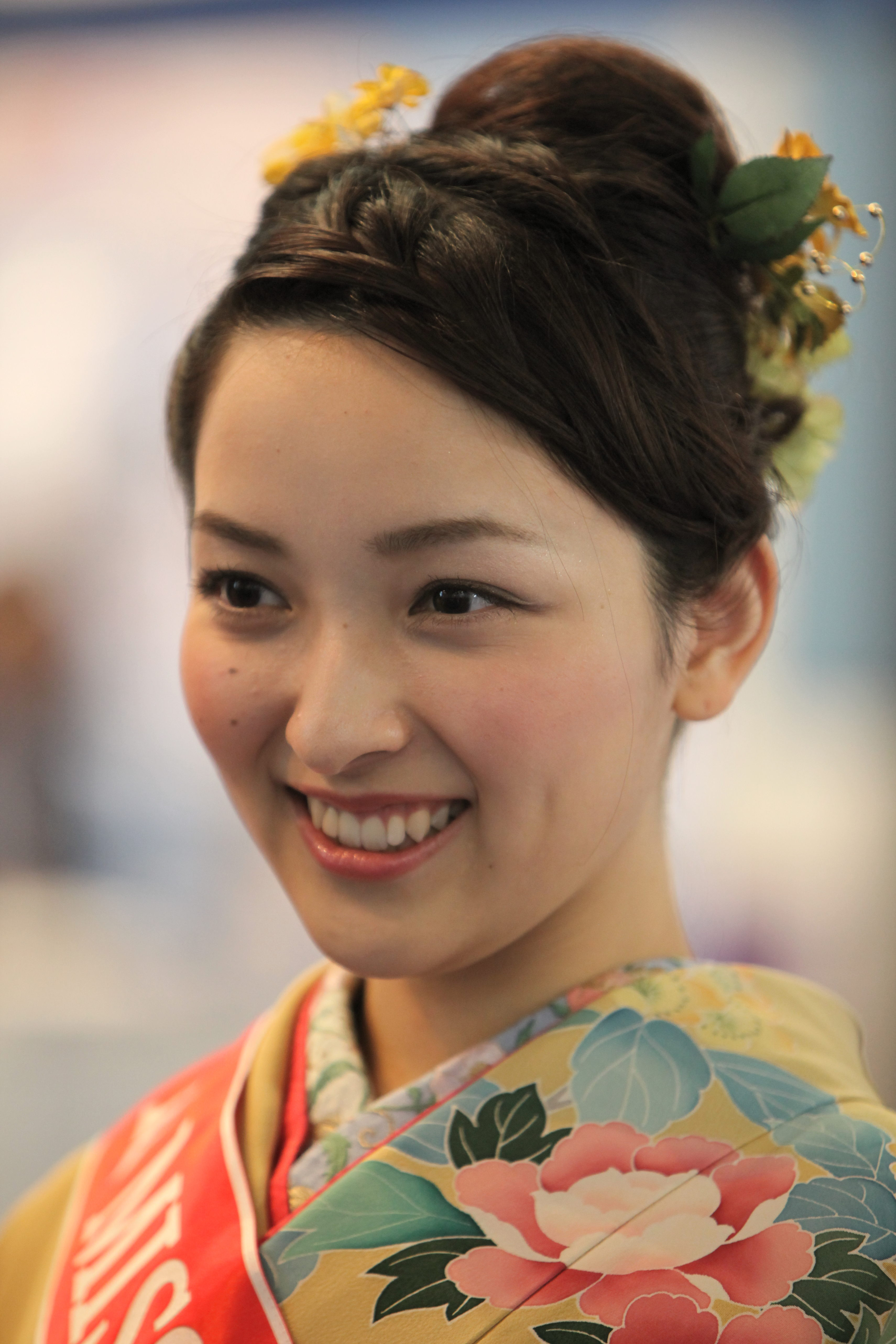
- Born: Maria Kamiyama; 17 February 1987 (age 39); Tokyo, Japan
- Height: 1.70 m (5 ft 7 in)
- Spouse: Kenneth Kobori (m. 2015)
- Children: 1
- Beauty pageant titleholder
- Title: Miss Universe Japan 2011
- Hair color: Black
- Major competitions: Miss Universe Japan 2011 (Winner); Miss Universe 2011 (9th runner-up of Best National Costume)

Maria Kamiyama (神山 まりあ, Kamiyama Maria; born 17 February 1987 in Tokyo) is a Japanese model and beauty pageant titleholder who won Miss Universe Japan 2011 and then represented Japan at Miss Universe 2011.

Born in Tokyo, she was a sales clerk before running in the pageant.

== Miss Universe Japan 2011 ==
Kamiyama was crowned Miss Universe Japan 2011 by outgoing national titleholder Maiko Itai on June 17, 2011, at the Tokyo Dome City Hall at Tokyo, Japan.

== Miss Universe 2011 ==
As the official representative of her country, she competed in the 2011 Miss Universe pageant, which was broadcast live from São Paulo, Brazil on September 12, 2011, Kamiyama competed to succeed Miss Universe titleholder, Ximena Navarrete of Mexico. Even though Kamiyama was not placed amongst the top 16, she was named the 9th runner-up for the Best National Costume.

== Personal life ==
On January 9, 2015, she married Kenneth Kobori, a music producer. On July 24, 2016, she gave birth to a baby boy.

Awards and achievements
Preceded by Maiko Itai	Miss Universe Japan; 2011	Succeeded by Ayako Hara
