= Yaeko =

- Gender: Female
- Language: Japanese

Origin
- Region of origin: Japan

Yaeko is a female Japanese given name.

== People ==
- Yaeko Batchelor (バチェラー 八重子; 1884–1962), Ainu waka poet and evangelist.
- Yamamoto Yaeko (山本 八重子; 1845–1932), Japanese nurse, wife of Joseph Hardy Neesima
- Yaeko Mizutani I (水谷 八重子; 1905–1979), Japanese actress
- Yaeko Nogami (野上 弥生子; 1885–1985), Japanese novelist
- Yaeko Yamazaki (山崎 八重子; born 1950), Japanese volleyball player
- Yaeko Taguchi (田口 八重子; born 1955), Japanese woman kidnapped by North Korea
- Yaeko Uehara, a geiko and Mineko Iwasaki's older sister.
