= Miss Universe 2003 =

52nd edition of the Miss Universe competition

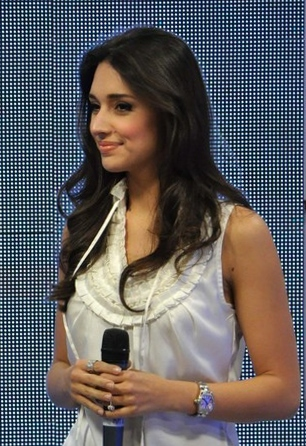
- Amelia Vega
- Date: 3 June 2003
- Presenters: Billy Bush; Daisy Fuentes
- Entertainment: Bond; Chayanne
- Venue: Figali Convention Center, Panama City, Panama
- Broadcaster: International :NBC; Official:TVN
- Entrants: 71
- Placements: 15
- Withdrawals: British Virgin Islands; Chile; Ghana; Honduras; Kenya; Northern Mariana Islands; Portugal; United States Virgin Islands; Uruguay
- Returns: Argentina; Barbados; Belize; New Zealand; Chinese Taipei
- Winner: Amelia Vega; Dominican Republic
- Congeniality: Kai Davis (Antigua and Barbuda)
- Best National Costume: Amelia Vega (Dominican Republic)
- Photogenic: Carla Tricoli (Puerto Rico)

Miss Universe 2003 was the 52nd Miss Universe pageant, held at the Figali Convention Center in Panama City, Panama, on 3 June 2003.

The winner, Amelia Vega of the Dominican Republic was crowned by Justine Pasek of Panama as Miss Universe 2003. It was the country's first victory in the pageant's history.

Contestants from seventy-one countries and territories competed in this year's pageant. The competition was hosted by Billy Bush and Daisy Fuentes. Musical quartet Bond and Puerto Rican singer-composer Chayanne performed in this year's pageant. This was also the first edition of Miss Universe to be aired on NBC.

== Background ==
=== Location and date ===
At the end of the Miss Universe 2002 pageant, hosts Phil Simms and Daisy Fuentes announced that the next years pageant would be held in Panama City, Panama. It is the second time that Panama hosted the pageant; the first being Miss Universe 1986.

Due to the ongoing SARS outbreak at the time, Juan Carlos Navarro, the mayor of Panama City, required the candidates to show medical certification that they were virus free.

=== Selection of participants ===
Contestants from seventy-one countries and territories were selected to compete in the pageant. Five delegates were appointees to their position to replace the original dethroned winner.

==== Replacements ====
The winner of Miss Czech Republic 2002, Kateřina Průšová was replaced by Kateřina Smržová due to her poor English skills. Miss Egypt 2003, Horreya Farghally gave up her title following rumors of her secret marriage by the press. Farghally was replaced by Nour El-Semary. The winner of Eesti Miss Estonia 2003, Maili Nomm was replaced by Katrin Susi as she was underage. The winner of Miss Poland 2002, Marta Matyjasik decided not to participate at the pageant for academic reasons. Matyjasik was replaced by Iwona Makuch.

Miss Russia 2002, Svetlana Koroleva won Miss Europe 2002 in Lebanon, making her ineligible to participate in the competition. The Miss Russia organization then held a pageant called Miss Russia Universe 2003 which was won by Julia Kova. Kova was also unable to compete due to her being underage. The Miss Russia organization then chose Maria Smirnova, a 22-year-old model from Nizhny Novgorod, as their candidate, but she was rejected for her nude pictures in Playboy Russia. Finally the Miss Universe organization announced that it would accept Oksana Bondarenko, runner-up of Miss Russia 2002.

==== Returns, and withdrawals ====
The 2003 edition saw the returns of Argentina, Barbados, Belize, New Zealand, and Chinese Taipei. Barbados last competed in Miss Universe 1999, Belize in Miss Universe 2000, while the others last competed in Miss Universe 2001. The British Virgin Islands, Chile, Ghana, Honduras, Kenya, the Northern Mariana Islands, Portugal, the United States Virgin Islands, and Uruguay withdrew. Bethsaida Smith of the British Virgin Islands and Kimberly Castro of the Northern Mariana Islands withdrew due to lack of sponsorship. Chile, Ghana, Honduras, Kenya, Portugal, the United States Virgin Islands, and Uruguay withdrew after their respective organizations failed to hold a national competition or appoint a delegate.

Miss Iceland 2002, Manuela Ósk Harðardóttir withdrew, when dehydration caused by the weather prevented her from competing in the preliminary competition. Donna Tuara of the Cook Islands and Joyce Ramarofahatra of Madagascar did not compete due to lack of sponsorship. Tiziana Mifsud of Malta did not compete after the Miss Malta pageant lost its Miss Universe franchise. Mounia Achlaf of Algeria and Melanie Putria Dewita Sari of Indonesia withdrew for undisclosed reasons.

===== Participation of Venezuela at Miss Universe =====
On 9 May 2003, the Miss Venezuela Organization announced that Mariángel Ruiz, Miss Venezuela 2002, would not be competing for the first time since Miss Universe 1959. This was due to the strict foreign exchange controls imposed by then-Venezuelan President Hugo Chávez to prevent capital flight. According to Osmel Sousa, president of the Miss Venezuela Organization, US$80,000 was needed for the franchise fee to send Ruiz to the pageant. Venezuelan businessman Gustavo Cisneros, was able to fund Ruiz to Panama. This is after Mireya Moscoso, then-President of Panama, urged Cisneros to ensure that a Venezuelan candidate will compete at Miss Universe.

== Results ==
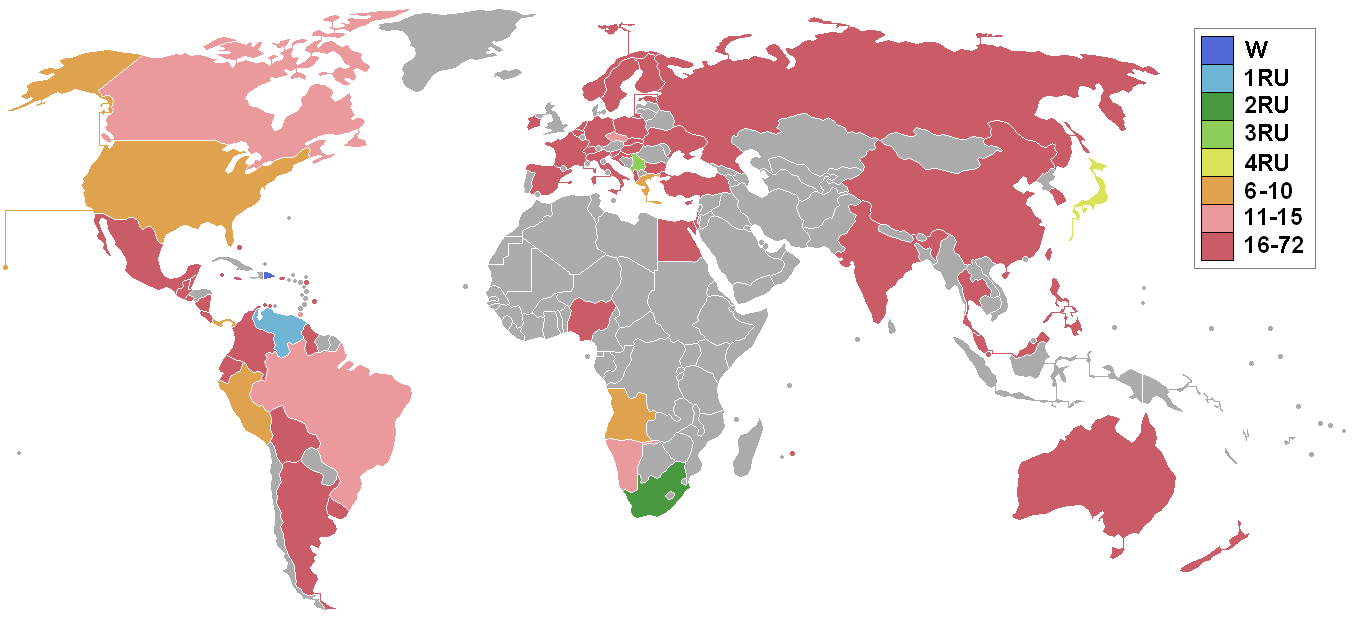
Miss Universe 2003 participating countries and territories

=== Placements ===
Placement	Contestant
Miss Universe 2003	Dominican Republic – Amelia Vega
1st Runner-Up	Venezuela – Mariángel Ruiz
2nd Runner-Up	South Africa – Cindy Nell
3rd Runner-Up	Serbia and Montenegro – Sanja Papić
4th Runner-Up	Japan – Miyako Miyazaki
Top 10	Brazil – Gislaine Ferreira; Canada – Leanne Cecile; Czech Republic – Kateřina Smržová; Namibia – Ndapewa Alfons; Trinidad and Tobago – Faye Alibocus
Top 15	Angola – Ana Sebastião; Greece – Marietta Chrousala; Panama – Stefanie de Roux; Peru – Claudia Ortiz de Zevallos; United States – Susie Castillo

=== Special awards ===
Award	Contestant
Miss Photogenic	Puerto Rico – Carla Tricoli
Miss Congeniality	Antigua and Barbuda – Kai Davis
Best National Costume	Dominican Republic – Amelia Vega

== Pageant ==
=== Format ===
The number of semi-finalists at this contest was increased from ten to fifteen. The preliminary competition began with fifteen contestants, and consisted of swimsuit and evening gown competitions and closed-door interviews. After the evening gown competition these were reduced to ten. Then the swimsuit competition reduced them to five. The five finalists then competed in the question and answer round and the final look.

=== Selection committee ===
==== Final telecast ====
- Maria Celeste Arraras – Puerto Rican author and broadcaster journalist at Telemundo
- Deborah Carthy-Deu – Miss Universe 1985 from Puerto Rico
- Roberto Cavalli – Italian fashion designer
- Richard Johnson – American field artist and visual journalist at The Washington Post
- Amelia Marshall – American actress
- Audrey Quock – American model and actress
- Peter Reckell – American actor
- Mathew St. Patrick – American actor
- Fernanda Tavares – Brazilian supermodel

== Contestants ==
Seventy-one contestants competed for the title.

Country/Territory	Contestant	Age (Note: Ages at the time of the pageant)	Hometown
Albania	Denisa Kola	20	Peshkopi
Angola	Ana Sebastião	19	Luanda
Antigua and Barbuda	Kai Davis	23	St. John's
Argentina	Laura Romero	22	La Plata
Aruba	Malayka Rasmijn	26	Paradera
Australia	Ashlea Talbot	19	Sydney
(The Bahamas) Bahamas	Nadia Johnson	21	Eleuthera
Barbados	Nadia Forte	20	Bridgetown
Belgium	Julie Taton	19	Jambes
Belize	Becky Bernard	21	Belize City
Bolivia	Irene Aguilera	24	Santa Cruz
Brazil	Gislaine Ferreira	19	Belo Horizonte
Bulgaria	Elena Tihomirova	22	Panagyurishte
Canada	Leanne Marie Cecile	26	Tecumseh
Cayman Islands	Nichelle Welcome	23	Bodden Town
China	Wu Wei	23	Fuzhou
Colombia	Diana Mantilla	21	Bucaramanga
Costa Rica	Andrea Ovares	22	San José
Croatia	Ivana Delic	23	Rijeka
Curaçao	Vanessa van Arendonk	22	Willemstad
Cyprus	Ivi Lazarou	20	Limassol
Czech Republic	Kateřina Smržová	22	Prague
Dominican Republic	Amelia Vega	18	Santiago
Ecuador	Andrea Jácome	23	Guayaquil
Egypt	Nour El-Semary	22	Cairo
El Salvador	Diana Valdivieso	20	Ahuachapán
Estonia	Katrin Susi	23	Tallinn
Finland	Anna Strömberg	20	Kristinestad
France	Emmanuelle Chossat	23	Paris
Germany	Alexsandra Vodjanikova	19	Munich
Greece	Marietta Chrousala	20	Athens
Guatemala	Florecita Cobián	19	Antigua
Guyana	Leanna Damond	25	New Amsterdam
Hungary	Viktoria Tomozi	20	Budapest
India	Nikita Anand	19	New Delhi
(Republic of Ireland) Ireland	Lesley Flood	21	Limerick
Israel	Sivan Klein	19	Jerusalem
Italy	Silvia Ceccon	20	Vicenza
Jamaica	Michelle Lecky	25	Kingston
Japan	Miyako Miyazaki	25	Kumamoto
Malaysia	Elaine Daly	26	Kuala Lumpur
Mauritius	Marie-Aimée Bergicourt	24	Terre Rouge
Mexico	Marisol González Casas	20	Torreón
Namibia	Ndapewa Alfons	24	Windhoek
Netherlands	Tessa Brix	22	Oud-Beijerland
New Zealand	Sharee Adams	23	Auckland
Nicaragua	Claudia Salmerón	25	Tipitapa
Nigeria	Ohumotu Bissong	19	Yala
Norway	Hanne-Karine Sørby	24	Oslo
Panama	Stefanie de Roux	20	Panama City
Peru	Claudia Ortiz de Zevallos	21	Arequipa
Philippines	Carla Gay Balingit	19	Angeles City
Poland	Iwona Makuch	21	Kielce
Puerto Rico	Carla Tricoli	21	Vieques
Russia	Olesya Bondarenko	24	Khabarovsk
Serbia and Montenegro (Note: Yugoslavia changed its name to Serbia & Montenegro.)	Sanja Papić	19	Novi Sad
Singapore	Bernice Wong	25	Singapore
Slovakia	Petra Mokrošová	20	Michalovce
Slovenia	Polona Baš	21	Maribor
South Africa	Cindy Nell	21	Johannesburg
South Korea	Keum Na-na	19	Daegu
Spain	Eva González	22	Seville
Sweden	Helena Stenbäck	23	Piteå
Switzerland	Nadine Vinzens	19	Chur
(Taiwan) Chinese Taipei (Note: Due to China's obstruction, Taiwan was forced to change her sash label to Chinese Taipei. However, pageant organizers allowed Szu-Yu Chen to use the Taiwan sash while off of the stage, but the Chinese Taipei sash during the public activities.)	Szu-Yu Chen	25	Taipei
Thailand	Yaowalak Traisurat	19	Nakhon Si Thammarat
Trinidad and Tobago	Faye Alibocus	23	San Fernando
Turkey	Özge Ulusoy	20	Istanbul
Ukraine	Lilja Kopytova	18	Dnipro
United States	Susie Castillo	23	Lawrence
Venezuela	Mariángel Ruiz	23	Maracay
