= Randy Emeka Obi =

Japanese footballer

Personal information
- Date of birth: 30 April 1999 (age 27)
- Place of birth: Tochigi, Japan
- Height: 1.98 m (6 ft 6 in)
- Position: Forward

Youth career
- FC Spirit
- FC Anhelo Utsunomiya
- 2015–2017: Albirex Niigata

Senior career*
Years	Team	Apps	(Gls)
2018–2019	Iwaki	5	(3)
2020–2023	Oliveirense	14	(1)
2021–2022	→ Benfica Castelo Branco (loan)	2	(0)
2023	→ Camacha (loan)	7	(0)
- * Club domestic league appearances and goals as of 14:30, 1 October 2023 (UTC)

Randy Emeka Obi (小枇 ランディ エメカ, Obi Randy Emeka; born 30 April 1999) is a Japanese professional footballer who plays as a forward. Currently a free agent, he most recently played for Campeonato de Portugal club Camacha, on loan from Oliveirense.

== Career ==
In January 2020, Obi signed a two-and-a-half-year contract for Liga Portugal 2 club Oliveirense from Iwaki.

On 31 January 2023, Obi joined Camacha on loan until the end of the 2022–23 season.
