= Keiko Tsuji =

Japanese model

- Born: October 9, 1993 (age 33); Nago, Okinawa, Japan
- Height: 1.68 m (5 ft 6 in)
- Beauty pageant titleholder
- Title: Miss Universe Japan 2014
- Hair color: Black
- Major competitions: Miss Universe Japan 2014 (Winner); Miss Universe 2014

Keiko Tsuji (辻 恵子, Tsuji Keiko; born October 9, 1993), is a Japanese teacher, model and beauty pageant titleholder who was crowned Miss Universe Japan 2014 and represented Japan in Miss Universe 2014.

== Early life ==
Tsuji is a student of Japanese literature at a Japanese college, an artist in Nagasaki and a teacher of art origami in Japan.

== Pageantry ==
=== Miss Nagasaki 2014 ===
Tsuji was crowned Miss Nagasaki 2014 and became eligible to compete at the Miss Universe Japan pageant in 2014.

=== Miss Universe Japan 2014 ===
Tsuji was crowned Miss Universe Japan represented Nagasaki together with Toru Higa who was crowned as Mister Japan 2014 from Okinawa. The event was held at the Chinzanso Hotel, Tokyo, on March 18, 2014.

=== Miss Universe 2014 ===
Tsuji competed at Miss Universe 2014 in Miami, Florida, United States. She was unplaced on the final night.

Awards and achievements
Preceded by Yukimi Matsuo	Miss Universe Japan; 2014	Succeeded by Ariana Miyamoto
