= Miyako Miyazaki =

Japanese fashion model and beauty pageant winner

- 宮崎 京
- Born: Miyako Miyazaki; 25 February 1978 (age 48); Kumamoto, Japan
- Occupation: Model
- Height: 1.7 m (5 ft 7 in)
- Beauty pageant titleholder
- Title: Miss Universe Japan 2003
- Major competitions: Miss Universe Japan 2003 (Winner); Miss Universe 2003 (4th Runner-Up)

Miyako Miyazaki (宮崎 京, Miyazaki Miyako; born 25 February 1978) is a Japanese actress, fashion model and beauty pageant titleholder who the winner of the Miss Universe Japan 2003.

Awards and achievements
Preceded by (Venezuela) Cynthia Lander	Miss Universe 4th runner-up 2003	Succeeded by (Trinidad and Tobago) Danielle Jones
Preceded by Mina Chiba	Miss Universe Japan; 2003	Succeeded by Eri Machimoto
