= Hiroko Mima =

Japanese model

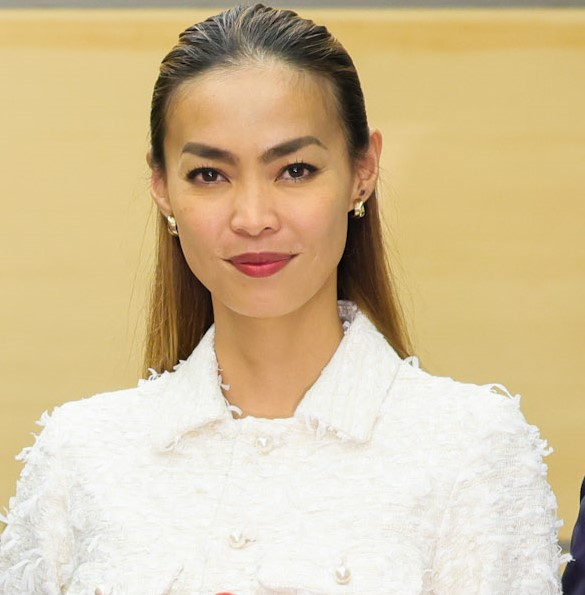
- Born: December 5, 1986 (age 39); Tokushima, Japan
- Height: 5 ft 9 in (1.75 m)
- Spouse: Alex McBride (m. 2024)
- Beauty pageant titleholder
- Title: Miss Universe Japan 2008
- Hair color: Black
- Eye color: Brown
- Major competitions: Miss Universe Japan 2008 (Winner); Miss Universe 2008 (Top 15)

Hiroko Mima (美馬 寛子, Mima Hiroko; born December 5, 1986) is a Japanese fashion model, athlete and beauty pageant titleholder who won Miss Universe Japan 2008. She then represented Japan at Miss Universe 2008 in Vietnam and placed Top 15.

== Biography ==
Mima attended Nihon University, majoring is physical education. Mima has a bone marrow disease which left the right side of her body incapacitated for three months when she was 13 years old, and a nerve disease called Guillain–Barré syndrome in junior high school. Since then Mima has returned to sports and competed seven times at the Japan National Track and Field Competition. She competes in the track and field team with a high jump of 1.65 m, approaching her own height of 1.73 m. Shortly after losing her grandmother, who died when she slipped on the bathroom floor, Mima lost her father in a car accident before winning Miss Universe Japan 2008.

== Miss Universe Japan ==
Hiroko Mima, as a 21-year-old physical education student from Tokushima in Western Japan, was crowned Miss Universe Japan 2008 on April 3, beating out nine other finalists and a total of about 4,000 entrants. Staged at the Tokyo International Forum, the final competition featured a "Fashion Island" performance. The nine other contestants who competed against Hiroko Mima were: Kana Anan, Sayo Yamaguchi, Yukari Honna, Moe Aoki, Yuri Horita, Rui Watanabe, Yoshimi Sato, Chie Hirai and Azusa Nishigaki.

== Miss Universe 2008 ==
She was the official representative for Japan at the Miss Universe 2008 pageant which took place in Nha Trang, Vietnam on July 14, 2008.

== Miss Universe Japan National Director ==
As of 2018, Hiroko Mima is the National Director of Miss Universe Japan. Mima have previously trained Emiri Miyasaka for Miss Universe 2009.

Preceded by Riyo Mori	Miss Universe Japan; 2008	Succeeded by Emiri Miyasaka
