= Miss Universe Japan =

National beauty pageant competition in Japan

Miss Universe Japan Organization ミス・ユニバース・ジャパン
- Formation: 1952; 74 years ago
- Headquarters: Tokyo
- Location: Japan
- Official language: Japanese
- President: Hiroko Mima
- Affiliations: Miss Universe
- Website: www.missuniversejapan.jp

Miss Universe Japan (Japanese: ミス・ユニバース・ジャパン) is a national Beauty pageant in Japan that selects a candidate for Miss Universe.

Since 2018, the national director of Miss Universe Japan is Hiroko Mima.

== History ==
The Miss Japan pageant was founded in 1952, and has had several sponsors. Between 1952 and 1995 it was sponsored and run by Asahi Broadcasting Corporation, this ended in 1995. Two years later, French businesswoman Inès Ligron established a company to operate the pageant as Miss Universe Japan. Until 2007, the organisation produced one winner, two top five runners-up and one top 15 semifinalist at Miss Universe. Under Ligron, Riyo Mori won Miss Universe 2007. In 2009, Ligron left the organisation.

== National directors ==
- 1952 Miss Japan - Yoshinaga (Japanese-American Press)
- 1998 Miss Universe Japan - Inès Ligron (WCBA)
- 2010 Miss Universe Japan - Izumi Toda and Akihiro Yoshida (HDR Corporation)
- 2018 Miss Universe Japan - Hiroko Mima

== Gallery of Miss Universe winners ==
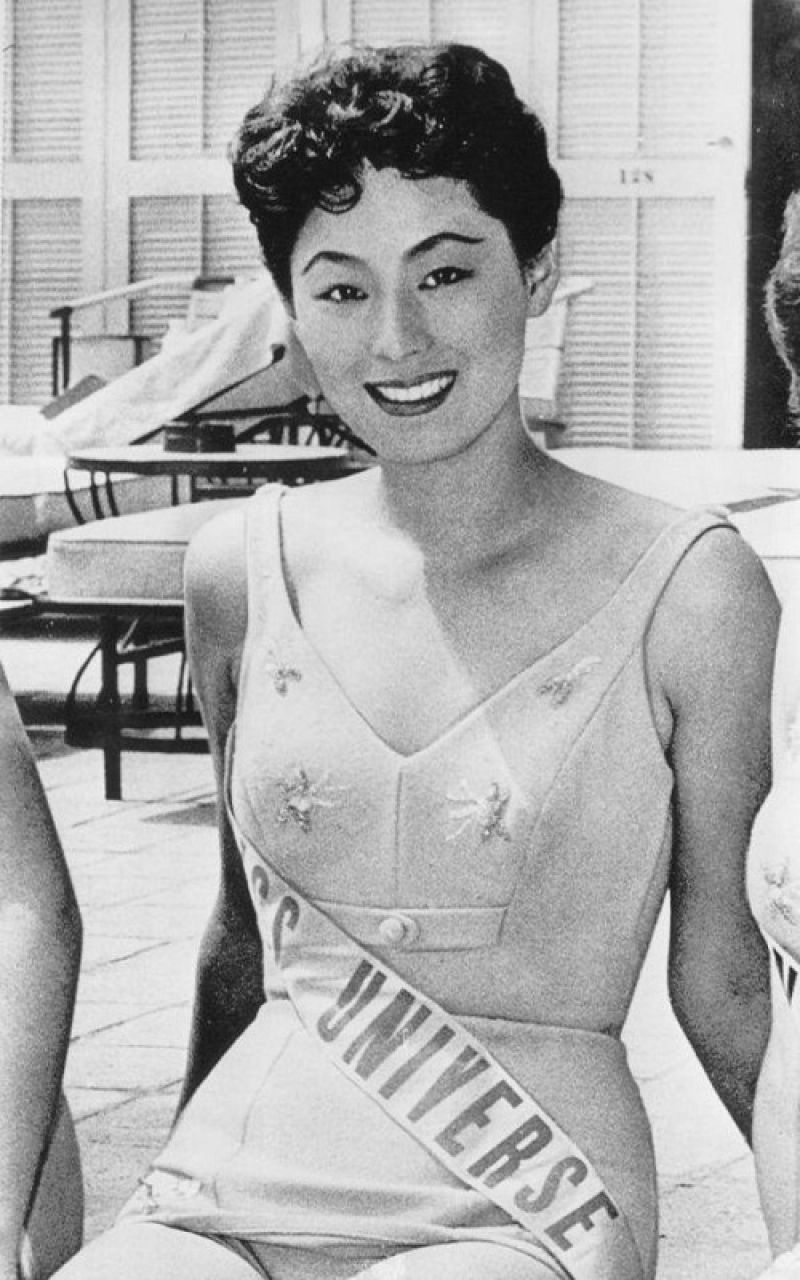
Akiko Kojima, Miss Universe 1959

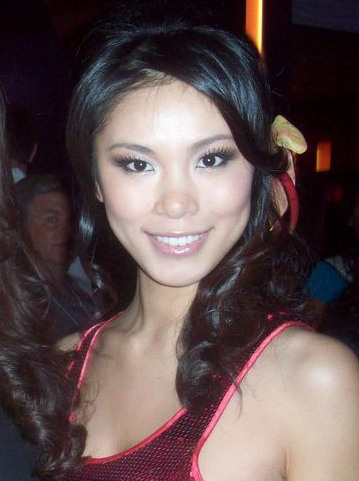
Riyo Mori, Miss Universe 2007

== Titleholders ==
- : Declared the Winner
- : Finished as a runner-up or top 5/6 qualification
- : Finished as one of the finalists or semifinalists
- : Finished as a special awards winner

The Miss Japan pageant existed from 1952 to 1995. During that period, the pageant managed to produce a winner and three top 5 finalists at the Miss Universe pageant. In 1959, Akiko Kojima claimed the first crown for Japan. After reaching the top 12 in 1975, Japan managed to place only one more time prior to 1995, when Mizuho Sakaguchi took fourth place in 1988. In 1998, the Miss Universe Japan pageant acquired the Miss Universe license. The winner of Miss Universe Japan represents her country at Miss Universe. On occasion, when the winner does not qualify (due to age) for either contest, a runner-up is sent.

Year	Prefecture	Miss Universe Japan	Japanese Name	Placement at Miss Universe	Special Awards
Hiroko Mima directorship — a franchise holder to Miss Universe from 2018
2027	TBA	TBA	TBA	TBA	
2026	Fukuoka	Sayuki Ito	さゆき 伊藤	TBA	
2025	Tochigi	Kaori Hashimoto	橋本香織	Top 30	
2024	Hyōgo	Kaya Chakrabortty	チャクラボルティ 雅	Top 30	
2023	Shizuoka	Rio Miyazaki	宮崎 莉緒	Unplaced	
2022	Chiba	Marybelén Sakamoto	マリベレン坂本	Unplaced	
2021	Tokyo	Juri Watanabe	渡邉珠理	Top 16	
2020	Chiba	Aisha Harumi Tochigi	杤木愛シャ暖望	Unplaced	
2019	Hyōgo	Ako Kamo	加茂 あこ	Unplaced	
2018	Mie	Yuumi Kato	加藤 遊海	Unplaced	
Izumi Toda and Akihiro Yoshida (HDR Corporation) directorship: Miss Japan Organization — a franchise holder to Miss Universe between 2010―2017
2017	Chiba	Momoko Abe	阿部 桃子	Unplaced	Best National Costume
2016	Shiga	Sari Nakazawa	中沢 沙理	Unplaced	
2015	Nagasaki	Ariana Miyamoto	宮本 エリアナ	Top 10	
2014	Nagasaki	Keiko Tsuji	辻 恵子	Unplaced	
2013	Mie	Yukimi Matsuo	松尾 幸実	Unplaced	
2012	Miyagi	Ayako Hara	原 綾子	Unplaced	
2011	Tokyo	Maria Kamiyama	神山 まりあ	Unplaced	
2010	Ōita	Maiko Itai	板井 麻衣子	Unplaced	
Inès Ligron (WCBA) directorship — a franchise holder to Miss Universe between 1998―2009
2009	Tokyo	Emiri Miyasaka	宮坂 絵美里	Unplaced	
2008	Tokushima	Hiroko Mima	美馬 寛子	Top 15	
2007	Shizuoka	Riyo Mori	森 理世	Miss Universe 2007	
2006	Okinawa	Kurara Chibana	知花 くらら	1st Runner-up	Best National Costume
2005	Aichi	Yukari Kuzuya	葛谷 由香里	Unplaced	
2004	Hiroshima	Eri Machimoto	町本 絵里	Unplaced	
2003	Kumamoto	Miyako Miyazaki	宮崎 京	4th Runner-up	
2002	Tokyo	Mina Chiba	千葉 美苗	Unplaced	
2001	Aomori	Misao Arauchi	荒内 美沙緒	Unplaced	
2000	Tokyo	Mayu Endo	遠藤 真由	Unplaced	
1999	Saitama	Satomi Ogawa	小川 里美	Unplaced	
1998	Tokyo	Nana Okumura	奥村 ナナ	Unplaced	
Yoshinaga (Japanese-American Press) directorship — a franchise holder to Miss Universe between 1952―1995
Did not compete between 1996—1997
1995	Saitama	Narumi Saeki	佐伯 成美	Unplaced	
1994	Kagawa	Chiaki Kawahito	川人 千明	Unplaced	
1993	Hyōgo	Yukiko Shiki	志岐 幸子	Unplaced	
1992	Aichi	Akiko Ando	安藤 晃子	Unplaced	
1991	Osaka	Atsuko Yamamoto	山本 亜津子	Unplaced	
1990	Ehime	Hiroko Miyoshi	三好 浩子	Unplaced	
1989	Hokkaido	Eri Tashiro	田代 絵里	Unplaced	
1988	Hyōgo	Mizuho Sakaguchi	坂口 美津穂	3rd Runner-up	
1987	Okayama	Hiroe Namba	難波 央江	Unplaced	
1986	Gifu	Hiroko Esaki	江崎 普子	Unplaced	
1985	Osaka	Hatsumi Furusawa	古沢 初美	Unplaced	
1984	Tokyo	Megumi Niiyama	新山 恵	Unplaced	
1983	Osaka	Yuko Yamaguchi	山口 遊子	Unplaced	
1982	Tokyo	Eri Okuwaki	奥脇 絵里	Unplaced	
1981	Kyoto	Mineko Orisaku	織作 峰子	Unplaced	
1980	Tokyo	Hisae Hiyama	檜山 久恵	Unplaced	
1979	Tokyo	Yurika Kuroda	黒田 百合香	Unplaced	Miss Congeniality
1978	Osaka	Hisako Manda	萬田 久子	Unplaced	
1977	Tokyo	Kyoko Sato	佐藤 恭子	Unplaced	
1976	Osaka	Miyako Iwakuni	岩国 美弥子	Unplaced	
1975	Hokkaido	Sachiko Nakayama	中山 幸子	Top 12	
1974	Tokyo	Eriko Tsuboi	坪井 江里子	Unplaced	
1973	Ibaraki	Miyoko Sometani	染谷 美代子	Top 12	
1972	Tokyo	Harumi Maeda	前田 晴美	Top 12	
1971	Tokyo	Shigeko Taketomi	武富 茂子	Top 12	Best Swimsuit
1970	Tokyo	Jun Shimada	島田 純	3rd Runner-up	Best Swimsuit
1969	Aichi	Kikuyo Osuka	大須賀 喜久代	4th Runner-up	
1968	Tokyo	Yasuyo Iino	飯野 矢住代	Unplaced	Miss Congeniality
1967	Osaka	Kayoko Fujikawa	藤川 香代子	Unplaced	
1966	Osaka	Atsumi Ikeno	池野 温美	Unplaced	
1965	Tokyo	Mari Katayama	片山 まり	Unplaced	
1964	Hyōgo	Chizuko Matsumoto	松本 千都子	Unplaced	
1963	Miyagi	Noriko Ando	安藤 矩子	Top 15	
1962	Kyoto	Kazuko Hirano	平野 和子	Unplaced	
1961	Tokyo	Akemi Toyama	遠山 明美	Unplaced	
1960	Fukuoka	Yayoi Furuno	古野 弥生	Top 15	
1959	Tokyo	Akiko Kojima	児島 明子	Miss Universe 1959	
1958	Fukuoka	Tomoko Moritake	森武 知子	Top 15	Miss Congeniality
1957	Tokyo	Kyoko Otani	大谷 享子	Top 15	
1956	Fukushima	Yoshie Baba	馬場 祥江	Unplaced	
1955	Tokyo	Keiko Takahashi	高橋 敬緯子	4th Runner-up	
1954	Aichi	Mieko Kondo	近藤 美恵子	Unplaced	
1953	Tokyo	Kinuko Ito	伊東 絹子	2nd Runner-up	
1952	Osaka	Himeko Kojima	小島 日女子	Unplaced	

== See also ==
- Miss International Japan
- Miss World Japan
- Miss Grand Japan
- Miss Earth Japan
- Miss Japan
- Miss Nippon
- Mister Japan
