= History 1 =

HISTORY 1

Compilation album by Chicago Poodle
- Released: November 30, 2011
- Recorded: 2004–2011
- Genre: J-pop, rock, jazz
- Length: Disc 1: 74:00; Disc 2: 71:00
- Label: Giza Studio
- Producer: Chicago Poodle

Chicago Poodle chronology
GTBT (2010)	HISTORY 1 (2011)	3.0 (2013)

HISTORY 1 is the first compilation album by Japanese pop-rock band Chicago Poodle. It was released on 30 November 2011 by Giza Studio label.

== Background ==
The album consists of indies and major label songs which has been released over past seven years since their debut.

Their fifth single Sakurairo was exclusively released in this compilation album. Taiyo wa Shitteru is a completely new songs which hasn't been published anywhere else.

This is their first and the only album so far which has been released in two formats: regular CD edition and limited CD+DVD edition. DVD disc contains footage of their live performances and several music videoclips.

A special website was launched to promote the album with the preview track list and message by band themselves.

== Charting ==
The album reached the #58 rank in Oricon for its first week and sold 1,798 copies. It charted for two weeks and sold 2,219 copies in total.

== Track listing ==
All the tracks has been arranged by Chicago Poodle.

=== Disc 1 ===
All music is composed by Kouta Hanazawa

History 1
No.	Title	Lyrics	Length
1.	"Oddysey" (debut major single)	Kenji Tsujimoto	4:02
2.	"Hello" (indies 2nd single "songs 4 one day EP")	Hidenori Sugioka	4:02
3.	"Ryuusei (流星)" (1st indies album "one")	Tsujimoto	3:08
4.	"No Regret" (2nd major album GTBT)	Norihito Yamaguchi	4:36
5.	"Fly ~Kaze ga Fukinuketeiku~ (Fly 〜風が吹き抜けていく〜)" (4th major single)	Tsujimoto	4:17
6.	"Sayonara Baby (さよならベイベー)" (3rd major single)	Tsujimoto	4:40
7.	"Listen to my heart" (2nd indies mini album "New Old Fashioned")	Sugioka	3:42
8.	"Natsu Mellon (ナツメロ)" (2nd major single)	Yamaguchi	4:24
9.	"Twinkle Little Stars ~Hoshi ga Furu Machi~ (Twinkle Little Stars 〜星が降る町〜)" (2nd major single's coupling song)	Chicago Poodle	4:32
10.	"Ai Sansan (愛燦燦)" (3rd indies single)	Chicago Poodle	5:05
11.	"Nega Poji (ネガポジ)" (2nd indies mini album "NEW OLD FASHIONED")	Tsujimoto	4:47
12.	"one" (1st indies album "one")	Yamaguchi	4:36
13.	"If" (from 2nd indies album "Piano roman")	Yamaguchi	3:56
14.	"Ebony & Ivory" (3rd indies album "Kazegai Jokyoku")	Tsujimoto	3:40
15.	"Snow liver" (2nd indies album "Piano roman")	Yamaguchi	4:16
16.	"Tabibito (旅人)" (1st major album Boku Tabi)	Yamaguchi	5:32
17.	"Love & free peace forever" (1st indies mini album "White mini album")	Sugioka	5:46

=== Disc 2 ===
All music is composed by Kouta Hanazawa

History 1
No.	Title	Lyrics	Length
1.	"Hallelujah (ハレルヤ)" (1st major album Boku Tabi)	Kenji Tsujimoto	4:32
2.	"Yume (夢)" (debut indies single "Yume")	Norihito Yamaguchi	3:49
3.	"Is This LOVE?" (2nd digital single)	Tsujimoto	3:55
4.	"Neon (ネオン)" (3rd indies album "Kazegai Jokyoku")	Tsujimoto	4:55
5.	"Sakurairo (桜色)" (5th major single)	Yamaguchi	3:47
6.	"Ai no Tane (アイノタネ)" (2nd major album GTBT)	Yamaguchi	5:46
7.	"PEACE!!" (2nd major album GTBT)	Tsujimoto	4:24
8.	"Fuwari (フワリ)" (2nd indies album "Piano roman")	Yamaguchi	3:33
9.	"Kyou no Koyukiji (京の小雪路)" (2nd indies mini album "NEW OLD FASHIONED")	Tsujimoto	4:13
10.	"Cry" (indies 1st single's c/w)	Yamaguchi	4:18
11.	"Blue Moon (ブルームーン)" (3rd indies single's coupling song)	Tsujimoto	4:15
12.	"Wondering" (1st indies album "one")	Tsujimoto	3:50
13.	"Baby my "Jenny"" (1st indies mini album "White mini album")	Hidenori Sugioka	5:29
14.	"One more time, I say "Love you"" (from 1st indies album "one")	Yamaguchi	5:28
15.	"Aureo (オーレオ)" (independent album "CHICAGO BULLDOG")	Sugioka	4:07
16.	"Taiyou wa Shitteiru (太陽は知っている)" (new song)	Yamaguchi	3:25

== Personnel ==
Credits adapted from the CD booklet of History 1.

- Kouta Hanazawa - composing, vocals, keyboard, piano
- Kenji Tsujimoto - bass, songwriting
- Norihito Yamaguchi - drums, songwriting
- Hidenori Sugioka - songwriting, guitars
- Yoshinobu Ohga (ex. OOM) - guitars
- Satoshi Iwakura - arranging, guitars
- Koga Kazunori - guitars
- Shunsuke Nakada - guitars
- Keisuke Kurumatani (ex. U-ka Saegusa in dB) - percussion
- Satoru Kobayashi - arranging, synthesizer
- Kakou Kanako (Harmony Fields) - accordion
- Ritchie Carvalley - percussion
- Masaomi Yokoo - saxophone
- Naoki Okajima - saxophone
- Makoto Higashi - trumpet
- Yoshinori Akai - mixed engineering
- Maki Nanase - mixed engineering
- Tatsuya Okada - mixed engineering
- Sachi Miura - mixed engineering
- Yukio Yamamoto - recording engineer
- Katsuhiro Shimada - mastering
- Gan kojima - art director
- Minoru - illustrator
- Nagisa Yamaguchi - photography
- Keita Iwao - A&R
- Kanonji - executive producer
- Hideaki Magate - label management
- Kazuhiro Mochida - director

== In media ==
- Sakurairo was used as ending theme for Asahi Broadcasting Corporation program Kazoku Lesson
  - ending theme for TV Kanazawa program "Tonari no TV Kinchan"
- Is this LOVE? was used as ending theme for Nihon TV program Himitsu no Kenmin Show
- Fly ~Kaze ga Fukinuketeiku~ was used as theme song for Asahi Broadcasting Corporation program Kazoku Lesson
- Hallelujah was used as ending theme for March of TV Kanazawa program "Tonari no TV Kinchan"
- Tabi Bito was used as ending theme for TV Tokyo program "Golf no Shizui"
- Oddysey was used as ending theme for TV Tokyo program "JAPAN COUNTDOWN"
- Natsu Mellon was used as ending theme for July of Sanyo Broadcasting program "Yutanpo"
- Sayonara Baby was used as ending theme for September of TV Kanazawa program "Tonari no TV Kinchan"
- Hello was used as ending theme for FM Kagoshima radio broadcast program W-ing Up
