= KTK =

KTK may refer to:

- TV Kanazawa, a Japanese broadcast network
- Kochi Tuskers Kerala, an Indian cricket team
- Khans of Tarkir, a collectible card game block
- KTK (TV station), a Kazakh TV station
