= 3.0 =

3.0 may refer to: three characters

== Music ==
- 3.0 (Marc Anthony album), 2013
- 3.0 (Chicago Poodle album), 2013
- 3.0 (Safri Duo album), 2003

== Other uses ==
- 2point0, professional wrestling tag team formerly known as 3.0
- BMW 3.0, car

== See also ==
- Version 3.0, 2009 album by Marie-Mai
