= Miss Nippon =

Japanese beauty contest

Miss Nippon ミス日本
- Formation: 1950
- Type: Beauty pageant
- Headquarters: Tokyo
- Location: Japan
- Members: General Incorporated Association Miss Nippon Association
- Official language: Japanese
- Contest chair: Ai Wada
- Website: missnippon.jp

YouTube information
- Channel: Miss Nippon Official YouTube Channel
- Years active: 2012–present
- Subscribers: 8.88 thousand
- Views: 7.26 thousand
- Last updated: August 5th, 2026

External videos
- Miss Nippon Official YouTube Channel
- ＜LIVE＞55th Miss Nippon Contest 2023 on YouTube
- ＜LIVE＞54th Miss Nippon Contest 2022 on YouTube
- ＜LIVE＞53rd Miss Nippon Contest 2021 on YouTube
- ＜LIVE＞52nd Miss Nippon Contest 2020 on YouTube

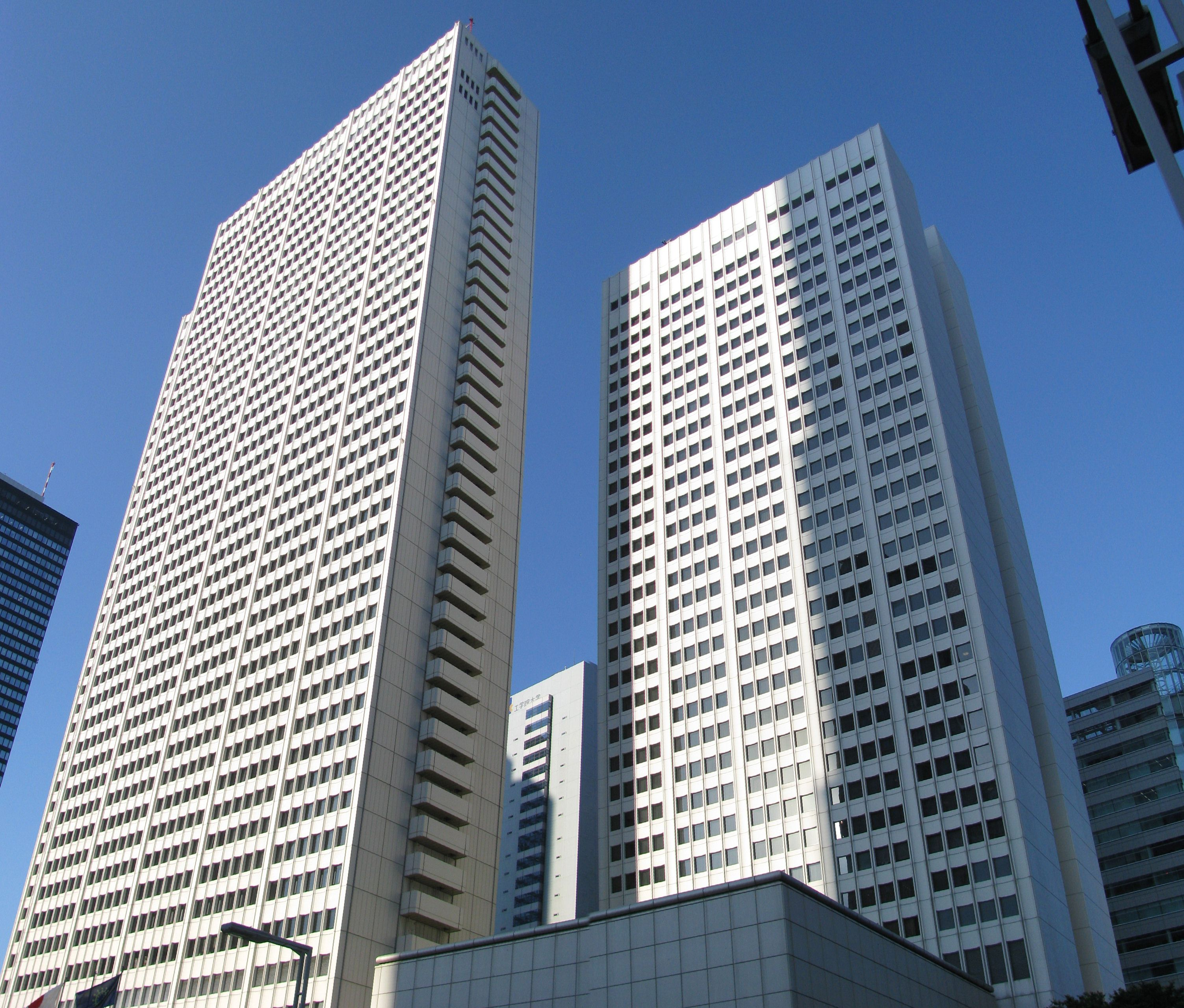
Keio Plaza Hotel, the venue for the final round (Tokyo Shinjuku)

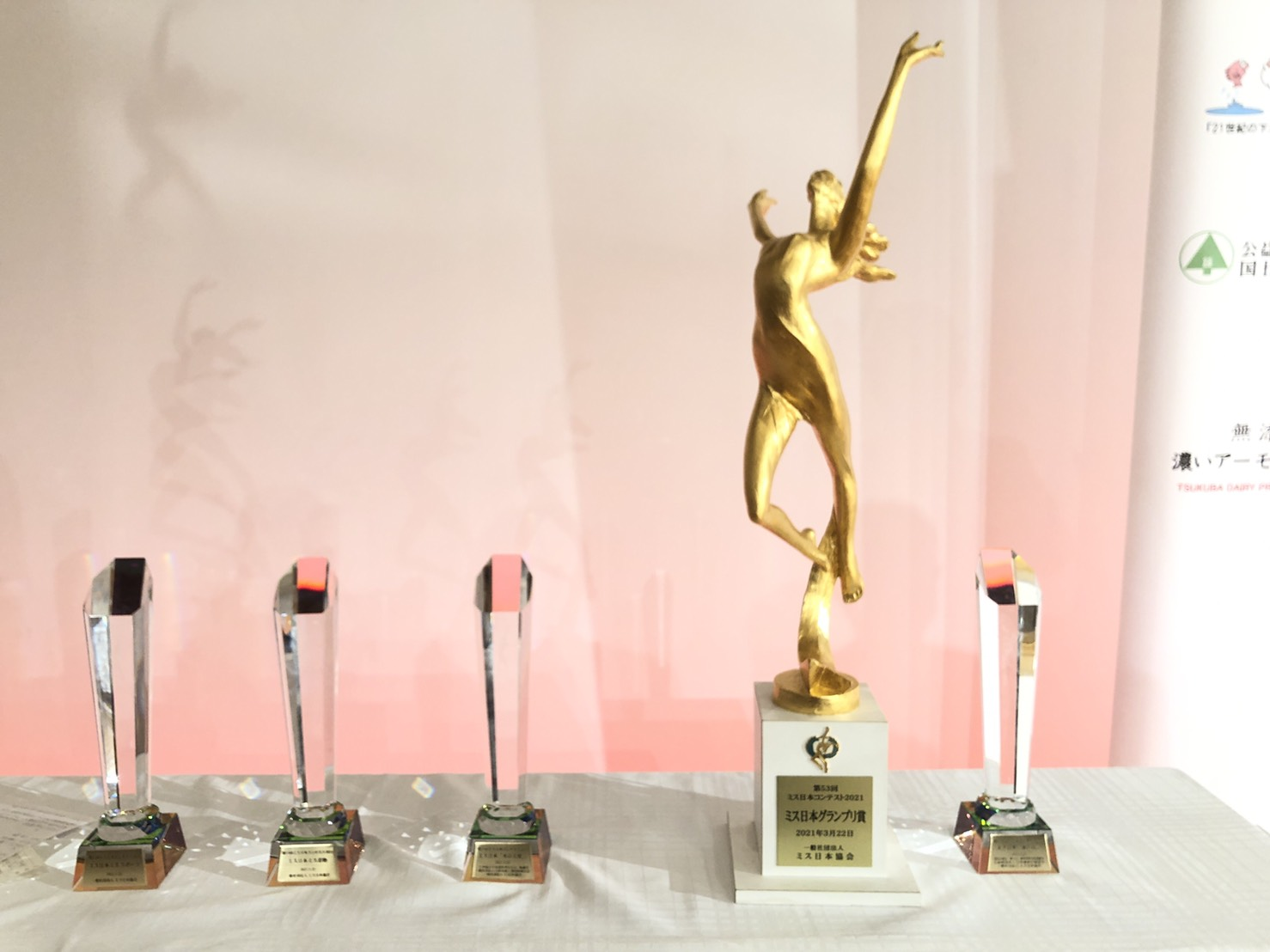
Blond statue, crystal trophy presented to the winners

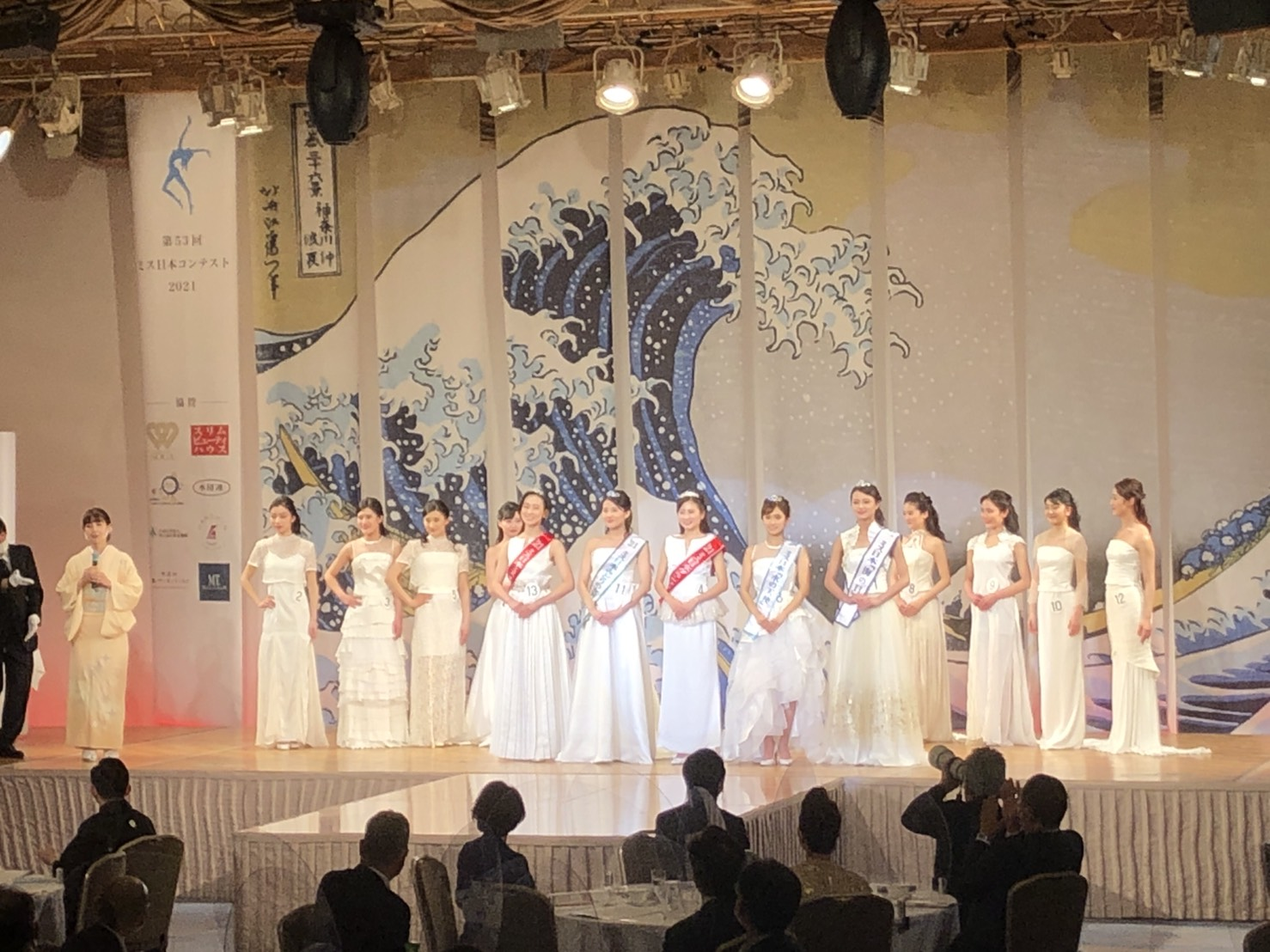
53rd Miss Nippon Contest 2021 (Shinjuku Keio Plaza Hotel Eminence Hall)

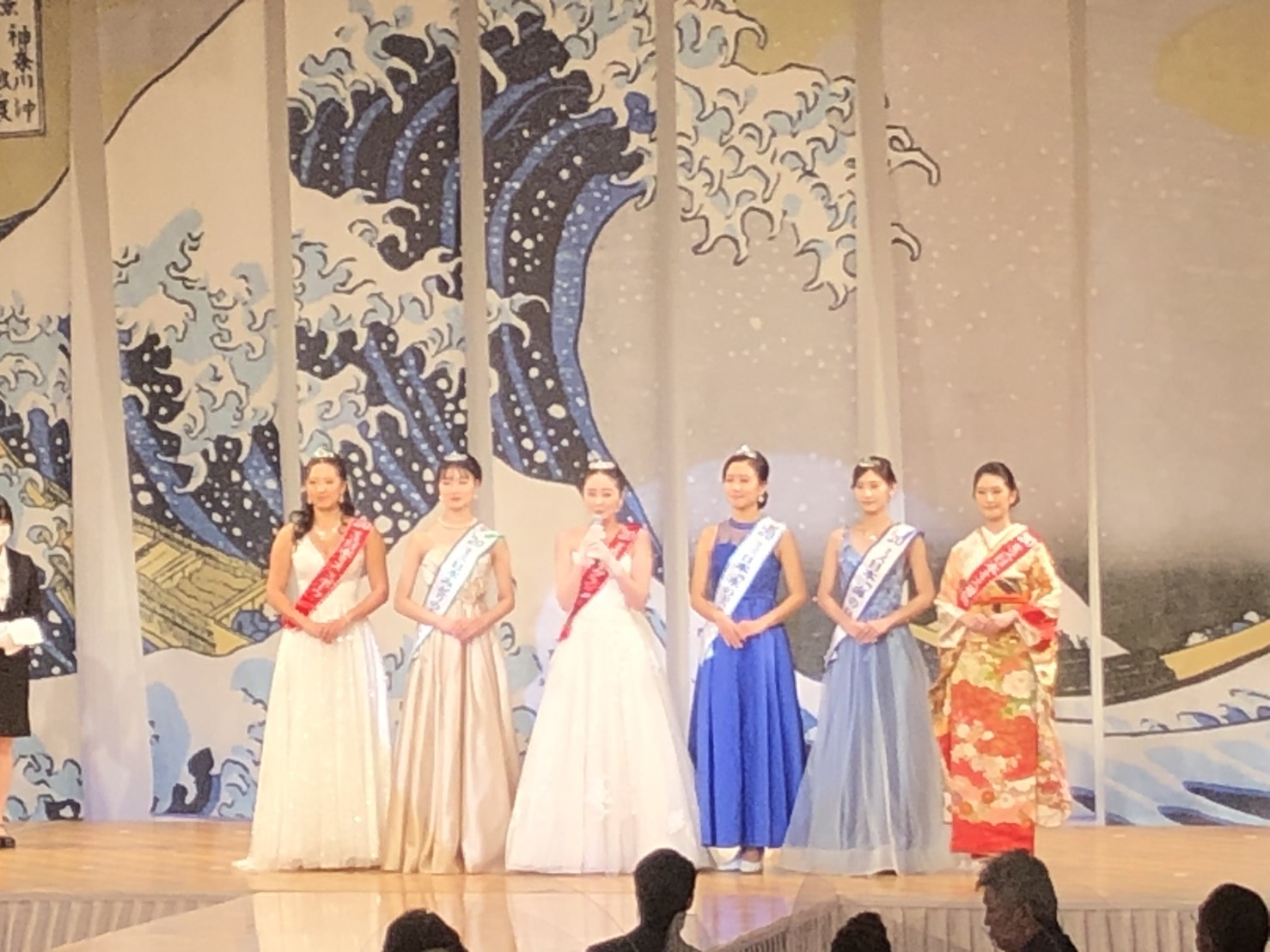
5 winners of the 52nd Miss Nippon Contest 2020

The Miss Nippon Contest (ミス日本コンテスト, Misu nippon kontesuto) is a Japanese beauty pageant. In the past 57 competitions, the total number of applications is 118,794 people and 55 people have won the Grand Prix. It started in 1950 by the Yomiuri Shimbun and is held every year by the "Miss Nippon Association".

== History ==
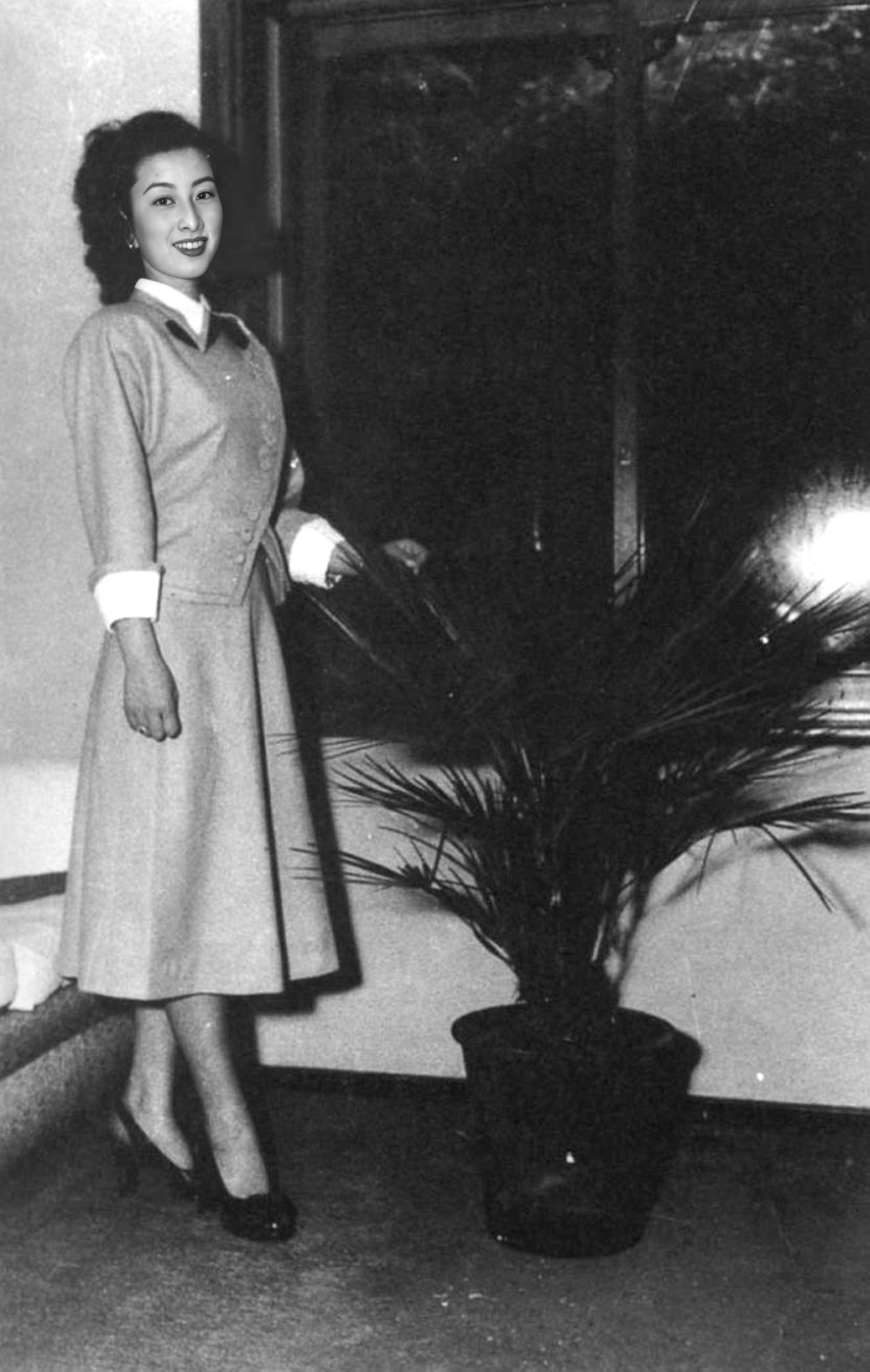
1st (1950) Miss Nippon Fujiko Yamamoto

In 1945, after the end of World War II, Japan entered a difficult era of reconstruction. Relief supplies "LARA supplies" sent from the United States saved Japanese children suffering from malnutrition. An urgent resolution of appreciation was adopted at the plenary session of members of the House of Representatives in 1947 for this act.

In 1950, a female goodwill ambassador was sent to thank the American people. The "Miss Nippon Contest" was held to select goodwill ambassadors. Fujiko Yamamoto, who later became one of Japan's leading movie actresses, won the first Miss Nippon.

After that, there was a time of interruption, and in 1968 it was the Wada Laboratory (formerly Wada Milk), a beauty research group represented by Shizuo Wada, who advocated and practiced the Wada-style figure ring method as slimming health beauty. At that time, Shizuo Wada was also in the limelight as a leader of television calisthenics.

"Miss Nippon" visited countries around the world with the letter of former Prime Minister Nobusuke Kishi and helped pave the way for the success of the Expo '70.

Wada Laboratory (Wada Shoji Co., Ltd.), which hosted the first revival tournament in 1968 to the 49th tournament in 2017, was formed on July 1, 2017, with the aim of further developing Miss Nippon. The hosting of the Miss Nippon Contest and the management of Miss Nippon were transferred to the Miss Nippon Association, and the philosophy was inherited.

Meanwhile, Yuko Wada of Miss Nippon (later married to Kaoru, the second son of Shizuo) from 1995 to 1979 became the chairman of the Miss Nippon Contest.

In 2019, in commemoration of the 50th anniversary of Miss Nippon's resurrection, "50 Years of Japanese Beauty, Showa, Heisei, and New Age Beauty" was released.

Ai Wada, who has been the "Miss Nippon Chief Manager" since August 1, 2020, has been appointed as the "Miss Nippon Contest Tournament chairman". Kentaro Wada is appointed as "Miss Nippon Contest Secretariat Representative". A new system by brothers and sisters has started.

== Eligibility for application ==
Applications are open to the public, and anyone who meets the following conditions can apply (as of 2021).

1. Having Japanese nationality
2. Being unmarried

== Selection method ==
Applicants who pass the document screening participate in any of the regional competitions held in several locations nationwide. Participants selected as "finalists" at the district tournament advance to the finals of the Miss Nippon Contest, and the winners of the Miss Nippon Grand Prix and others are decided in the end.

As with many modern Miss Contests, the criteria for selection are not limited to appearance, but the Japanese national team will be selected with the world competition in mind, to be held at a later date, such as "Miss Universe Japan". Unlike the contest, Miss Nippon's basic policy is to select "the highest level of Japanese beauty that is completed in Japan." In particular, in the internal examination, "education" and "feeling" are emphasized.

== Award ==
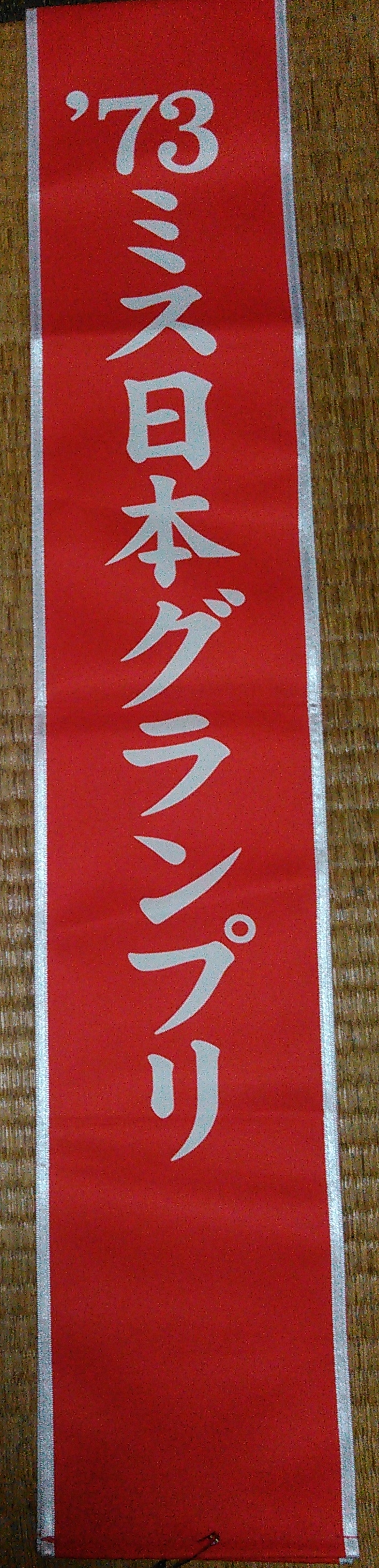
Tasuki presented to Miss Nippon winners (replica of the one presented to Mitsumi Tomita, the winner of the 1973 Grand Prix)

- Miss Nippon Grand Prix
  - "The highest level of beauty of Japanese women" that represents the year and is full of young and beautiful possibilities
- Miss Nippon Miss Kimono (from the first resurrection)
  - Play a role in conveying the beauty of Japan in the world by pretending to be the traditional beauty of Japan
- Miss Nippon "Marine Day" (newly established in 1996)
  - Thank you for the blessings of the sea that are indispensable to Japan, an island country, and play a role in raising understanding and interest in the marine industry.
- Miss Nippon "Water for Life" (newly established in 2012)
  - "Water public relations officer" who widely conveys Japan's excellent water cycle and the hearts and skills of the people who support it
- Miss Nippon Greenery for Life (newly established in 2015)
  - Thank the ancestors who have protected and nurtured the abundant greenery that will lead to the future, and play a role in spreading familiarity with greenery and forests.
- Miss Nippon Miss Sports (new in 2019)
  - Encourage physical and mental training and play a role in spreading the joy of taking on healthy challenges
- Semi-Miss Nippon
  - Semi-Miss Nippon in the Miss Nippon Contest is treated as the second prize after Miss Nippon, which is selected more than once. In other words, the order is Miss Nippon Grand Prix> Miss Nippon Awards> Semi-Miss Nippon.
- Shizuo Wada Special Award Miss Nippon (newly established in 2015)
  - Until now, Miss Nippon has been selected by open recruitment, but Shizuo Wada, the founder of Wada Laboratory (1922–2006), worked hard to revive Miss Nippon and laid the foundation for Japan's diet. To those who have already shown remarkable performance and cannot easily enter the contest in a busy position, with the idea of "giving honor and profit to beautiful women" in honor of Shizuo's achievements. This is a celebrity special award to commend a woman with great potential as Miss Nippon from the desire to support women with wonderful qualities of beauty and health, regardless of whether or not they have. Judging is a collegial recommendation system by the contest secretariat with four disciples who supported Miss Nippon together with Shizuo. As of 2021, only three people, Airi Hatakeyama and Marin Minamiya and Kiyou Shimizu, received this recommendation award.
- In the past, Miss Elegant, Miss Venus, Miss Nippon "Photogenic", Miss Nippon "Sky Day", Miss Nippon "International Friendship", Miss Nippon "Miss Swimsuit", Miss Nippon "Nature" (2003–2014) ) And other awards. In addition, there was a time when the contestants of the final tournament were also given the title of Miss Nippon. In fact, until the early 1990s, all the people who participated in the Grand Prix deciding tournament attended the Grand Prix deciding tournament with red and white letters and a sash that says "Miss Nippon" on the border. Currently, no sashes are hung during the judging of the final competition, but after the winners of each award are decided, the sashes on which the award-winning awards are written will be hung by the judges. At the official event of Miss Nippon attendance, we will attend with the award-winning tasuki.

== Miss Nippon Grand Prix ==
Number of times	Year	Number of participants	Winners	Japanese name	Later occupations, etc.
Founding
1st	1950	Unpublished (a little less than 700 people)	Fujiko Yamamoto	山本富士子	Actress (Daiei Film Exclusive → Free)
2nd	1952	Unpublished	Keiko Hibino	日比野恵子	Actress (Shintoho Exclusive → Free)
Resurrection Tournament
Resurrection 1st	1968	2,328	Noriko Suzuki (*)	鈴木紀子 (*)	
2nd	1969	1,476	Noriko Suzuki (*)	鈴木紀子 (*)	
3rd	1970	2,310	Sachiko Takeuchi	竹内幸子	
4th	1971	1,006	Yumiko Yoshimura	吉村由美子	
5th	1972	1,925	Chimomo Sakamoto	坂本千桃	Active actress → Retired Kanagawa and villa restaurant management
6th	1973	1,470	Mitsumi Hasegawa	長谷川みつ美	TV presenter, lyricist, essayist
7th	1974	2,373	Sawako Takubo	田窪佐和子	
8th	1976	1,723	Takami Asai	浅井孝美	Stage name: Takami Kyo, actress ("Mito Komon" etc.), talent model (Shiseido exclusive model), reporter)
9th	1977	1,114	Keiko Tezuka	手塚圭子	Doctor of Medicine, Cosmetology Researcher
10th	1978	1,249	Yasue Enomoto	榎本安江	
11th	1979	1,329	Chikako Murata	村田知嘉子	
12th	1980	1,654	Junko Kuwahara (*)	桑原順子 (*)	
13th	1981	3,310	Junko Kuwahara (*)	桑原順子 (*)	
14th	1982	2,256	Minegishi Fusako	峰岸房子	
15th	1983	2,661	Hiromi Yamaguchi	山口裕美	
16th	1984	2,051	Akiko Tsuneoka	常岡昭子	
17th	1985	2,445	Satomi Nemoto	根本里美	
18th	1986	2,557	Mami Nakamura	中村麻美	Presenter/painter
19th	1987	1,555	Keiko Ibi	伊比恵子	Film director (1999 Academy Award for Best Directing in Short Documentary)
20th	1988	1,778	Mika Tamai (Mika Kano)	玉井美香 (叶美香)	Talent (Kano sisters)
21st	1989	1,866	Reie Sawamoto	澤本礼江	
22nd	1990	1,760	Tomomi Soma	相馬知実	Shizuoka Broadcasting's active announcer → Retired from the company
23rd	1991	1,634	Emi Okamoto	岡本恵美	
24th	1992	1,722	Norika Fujiwara	藤原紀香	Talent and actress
25th	1993	1,942	Yoko Koiwai	小岩井陽子	
26th	1994	2,668	Naoko Matsuda	松田直子	Ministry of International Trade and Industry
27th	1995	2,572	Chihiro Nagai	長井千尋	
28th	1996	2,046	Miho Chikazawa	近澤美歩	Talent/singer → Tochigi Prefecture Japanese-style restaurant proprietress
29th	1997	2,423	Keiko Tamura	田村桂子	Model → Designer
30th	1998	2,476	Yoshiko Wada	和田淑子	University of Tokyo student at the time of award. Currently in school.
31st	1999	2,888	Yuri Komatsuda	小松田有理	United Nations → Official moderator
32nd	2000	3,192	Saori Amakawa (Saori Amakawa)	出川紗織 (天川紗織)	Musashi University student at the time of award → Actress/talent
33rd	2001	2,128	Ruriko Yate	野手るりこ	Dentist
34th	2002	2,088	Kumi Sano	佐野公美	University of the Sacred Heart student at the time of award. Currently in school. She later married Ryuichi Kawamura
35th	2003	2,364	Reiko Aizawa	相沢礼子	Talent presenter
36th	2004	2,528	Yuriko Saga (Yuriko Saga)	嵯峨百合子 （さがゆりこ）	Ferris Jogakuin University student at the time of award → Talent. Currently attending schoo;.
37th	2005	2,289	Risa Kume	久米里紗	Secretary at a company in Shizuoka.
38th	2006	2,461	Rie Kokubo	小久保利恵	Active talent model at the time of award → Waseda University student. Currently in school.
39th	2007	2,432	Mika Hagi	萩美香	Rikkyo University student → Talent ("Mie no Kuni" tourism ambassador). Currently in graduate school.
40th	2008	2,941	Eri Suzuki	鈴木恵理	Nihon University student at the time of award → Flight attendant. Currently in school.
41st	2009	3,508	Marino Miyata	宮田麻里乃	Awarded high school student → Waseda University
42nd	2010	3,663	Fumino Hayashi	林史乃	Sophia University student at the time of award. Currently in school.
43rd	2011	3,169	Marie Yanaka	谷中麻里衣	Received the Eiken Foundation of Japan Award, TOEIC 990 points. Keio University student at the time of award → Talent caster. Currently in school.
44th	2012	3,028	Kiko Arai	新井貴子	Flying disc player. Her father is a former professional baseball player Hiromasa Arai. Her sister in 2011 missed kimono Hisae Arai. She then she became a Paris Fashion Week model. Her husband is Keita Inagaki, the representative of Japan for rugby.
45th	2013	2,825	Erika Suzuki	鈴木恵梨佳	2010 Miss Nihon University (Miss Campus) Award → Landscaping and horticulture
46th	2014	2,533	Moeka Numata	沼田萌花	University of the Sacred Heart (Japan) student at the time of award. Currently in school.
47th	2015	2,426	Chisato Haga	芳賀千里	Former artistic swimming athlete in Japan national team
48th	2016	2,804	Mika Matsuno	松野未佳	Keio University student at the time of award. Currently in school. Her father is Yorihisa Matsuno.
49th	2017	2,156	Shiho Takada	高田紫帆	Osaka University student at the time of award. Currently in school. Former athletics junior olympics
50th	2018	2,803	Rei Ichihashi	市橋礼衣	Office worker at the time of award
51st	2019	2,354	Aiko Watarai	度会亜衣子	University of Tokyo student at the time of award. Currently in school.
52nd	2020	2,525	Anju Oda	小田安珠	Keio University student → Freelance announcer
53nd	2021	Unpublished	Asami Matsui	松井朝海	Kansai University student at the time of award. Currently in school. The third daughter of boat racer Shigeru Matsui.
54th	2022	Unpublished	Mizuka Kouno	河野瑞夏	International Christian University student at the time of award → Model. Currently in school.
55th	2023	Unpublished	Ema Yoshioka	吉岡恵麻	Kwansei Gakuin University student at the time of award. Currently in school.
56th	2024	Unpublished	vacant	vacant	The original winner, Karolina Shiino, relinquished the title of Miss Nippon due to reported infidelity, and organizers declared the Miss Nippon 2024 pageant vacant.
57th	2025	Unpublished	Marina Ishikawa	石川満里奈	Ferris University student at the time of award. Currently in school. Niece of Sayuri Ishikawa
58th	2026	Unpublished	Eko Noguchi	野口絵子	Keio University student at the time of award. Currently in school. Daughter of Ken Noguchi.
57 times in total		118,794 people	Grand Prix 59 people (*)		

(*) Noriko Suzuki and Junko Kuwahara won the award for the second consecutive year.

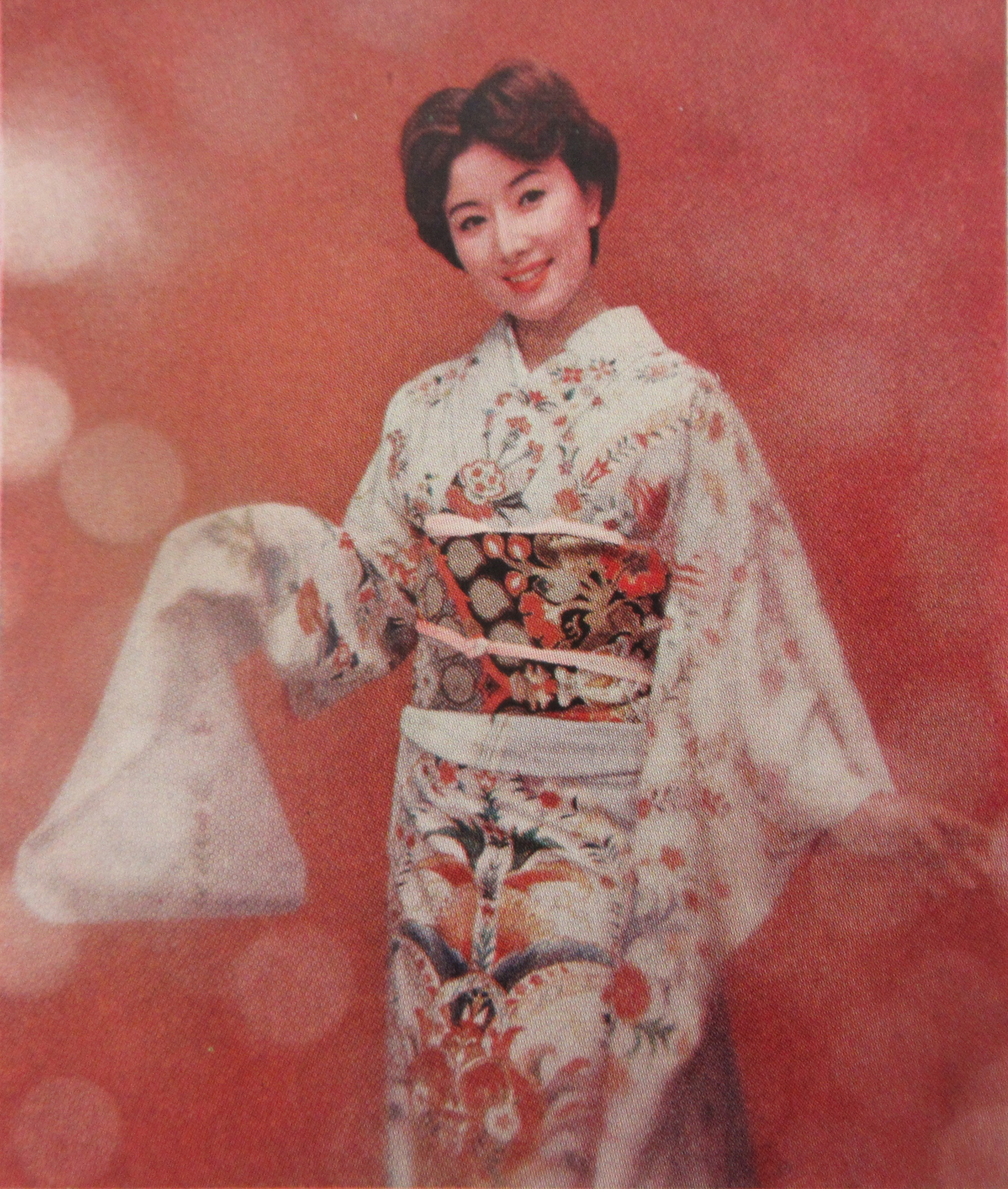
Fujiko Yamamoto (1950 Grand Prix)

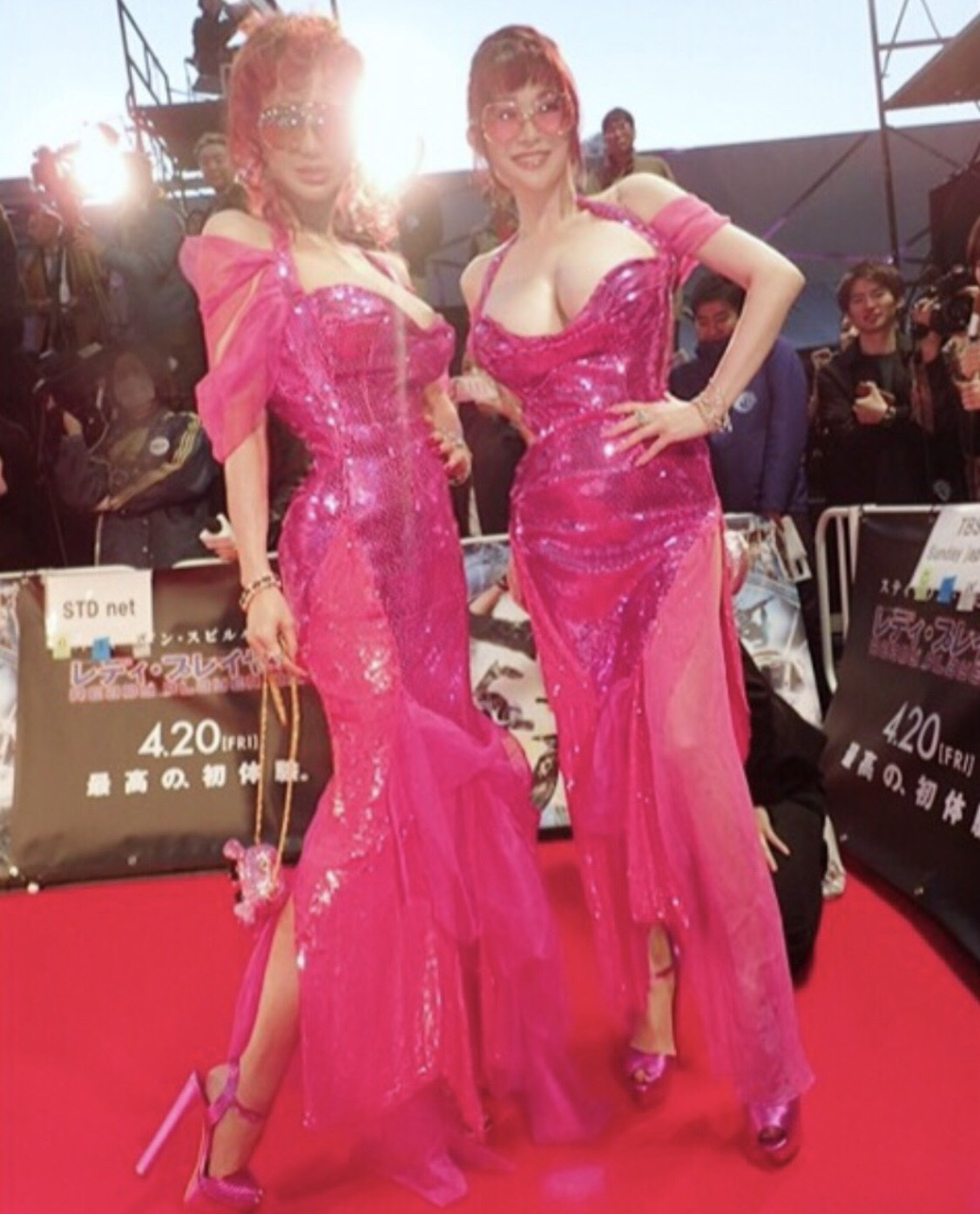
Mika Tamai (1988 Grand Prix Right Side)

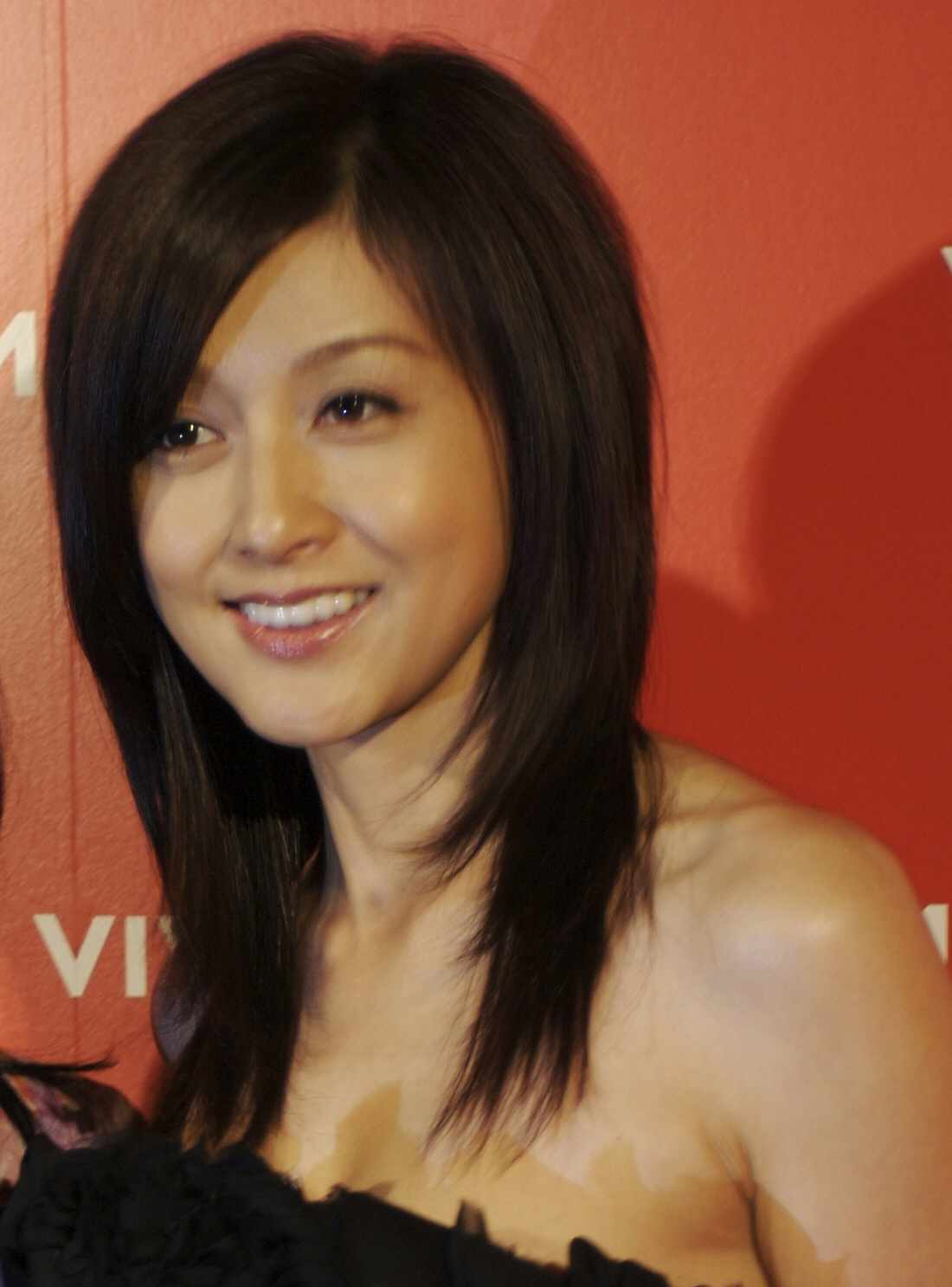
Norika Fujiwara (1992 Grand Prix)

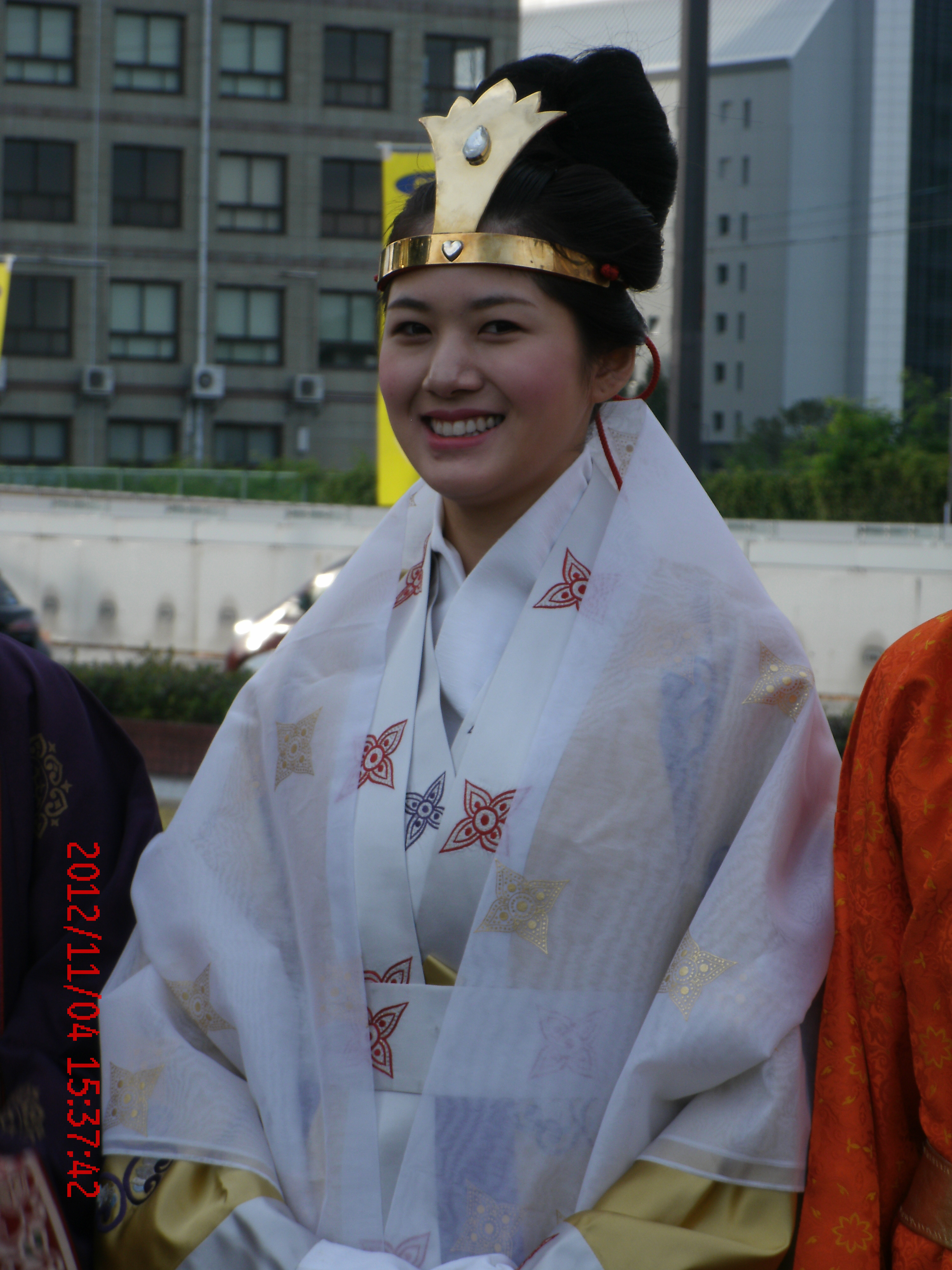
Kiko Arai (2012 Grand Prix)

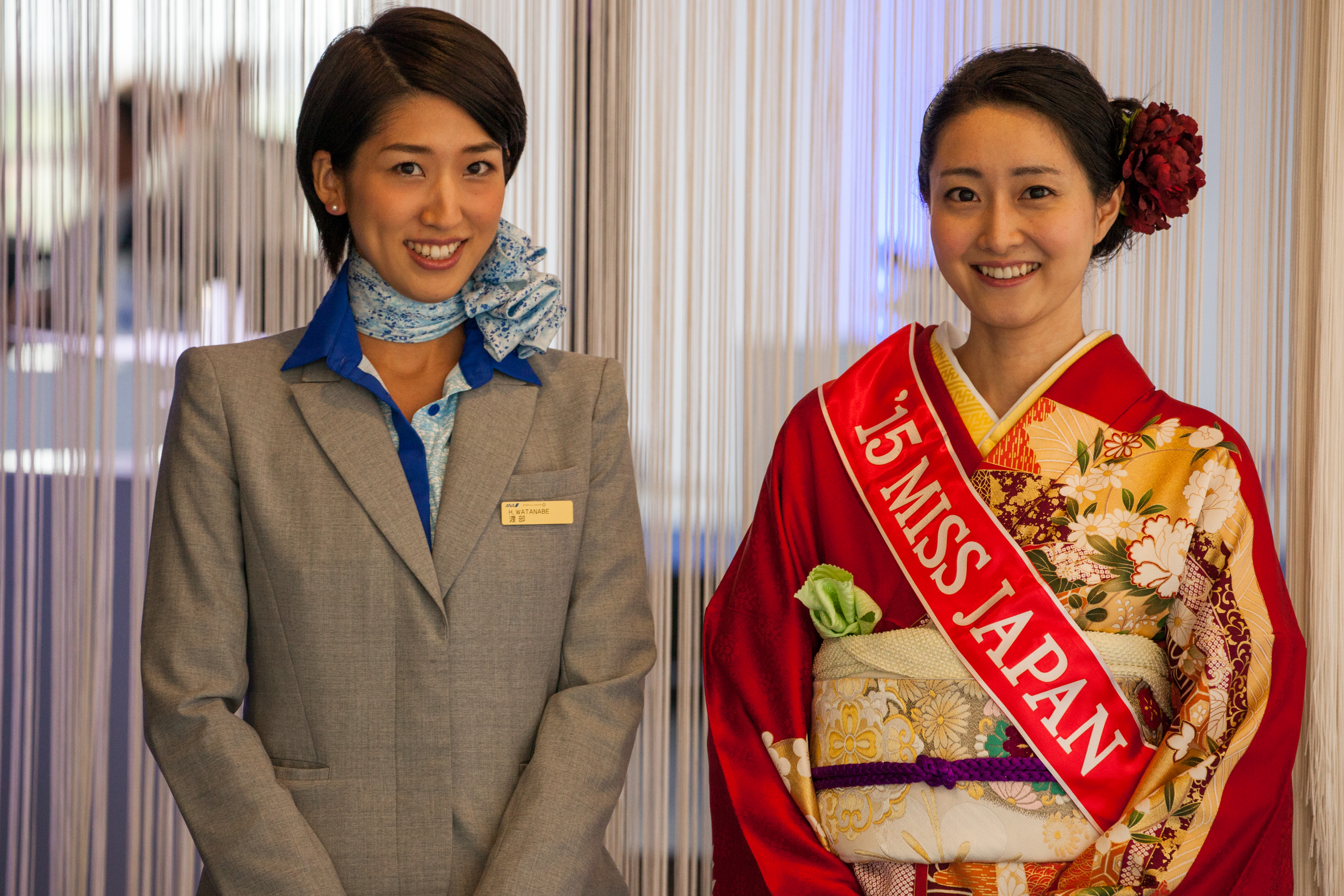
Chisato Haga (2015 Grand Prix Right Side)

== Famous winners/contestants other than the Grand Prix ==
Number of times	Year	Name	Japanese name	Later occupations, etc.
9th	1977	Yuko Wada	和田優子	Miss Nippon for the second consecutive year, former Miss Nippon Contest chairman (1995～2020)
10th	1978	Yuko Wada	和田優子	Miss Nippon for the second consecutive year, former Miss Nippon Contest chairman (1995～2020)
16th	1984	Hiroko Kawasaki	川崎博子	Model
17th	1985	Kaoru Oda	小田かおる	Actress
17th	1985	Tomomi Akasu	赤須知美	Cosmetology researcher later 1988 Miss World Associate Japan representative
18th	1986	Yumi Kotani	小谷ゆみ	Miss Nippon, model, 1988 Toyobo Campaign Girl
19th	1987	Arai Shoko	荒井晶子	Miss Nippon, actress, singer
19th	1987	Tagako Kuwahara	桑原多賀子	Miss Nippon, Bicycle Racer Masamitsu Takizawa Mrs.
21st	1989	Eriko Kobayashi	小林恵里子	Semi-Miss Nippon, Present: Model, PC Writer
22nd	1990	Miho Iijima	飯島美穂	Miss Nippon, later renamed to "Arai Sumire". Actress, model
22nd	1990	Lisa Itakura	板倉リサ	Miss Nippon, actress (starring Indian movie Bollywood), dancer
23rd	1991	Sumire Arai	新井すみれ	Miss Nippon, actress, model
23rd	1991	Norie Kikuchi	菊地則江	Miss Nippon, actress, model
24th	1992	Miwa Sano	佐野美和	Miss Nippon, later elected Hachioji City Assembly member. Present: talent, Politics Journalist
24th	1992	Masaki Araida	新井田雅樹	Miss Flower, Narrator Voice Actor
25th	1993	Yuki Takada	高田ゆき	Miss Nippon, Gravure Idol, Campaign Girl
26th	1994	Miki Otaka	大高未貴	Miss Nippon International Friendship, journalist, presenter
26th	1994	Hitoe Ohtake	大竹一重	Miss Nippon, actress, model
26th	1994	Fumi Mori	森富美	Miss Nippon, NTV Announcer
26th	1994	Izumi Iimura	飯村いづみ	Miss Nippon, actress, model
28th	1996	Ayako Nishikawa	西川史子	Photogenic Award, Doctor, talent
29th	1997	Junko Nakazawa	中沢純子	Photogenic Award, actress, talent
30th	1998	Yu Sakoda	迫田悠	Colombian Coffee Award, later renamed to "Haruka Mizusawa". talent, weather announcer
30th	1998	Miki Ueyama	上山美紀	Photogenic Award, Former Fukushima Television Announcer
31st	1999	Akiko Kotani	小谷亜希子	Miss Swimwear, talent
31st	1999	Rina Akamine	赤嶺梨奈	Semi-Miss Nippon, Fashion Model
33rd	2001	Hiroko Murakawa	村川浩子	Photogenic Award, gravure idol under the stage name "Riri Kawamura". In 2005, she married Shogi's Tadahisa Maruyama Kudan.
35th	2003	Hitomi Fujita	藤田瞳	Kansai representative, talent
35th	2003	Ayako Naruo	成尾亜矢子	Semi-Miss Nippon, Pianist
36th	2004	Megumi Kaneko	金子恵美	Assembly House of Representatives. Former Niigata Broadcasting employee
36th	2004	Arata Tomori	友利新	Semi-Miss Nippon, Doctor, talent
37th	2005	Aya Takashita	高下彩	Photogenic Award, Fashion Model, actress
37th	2005	Yuka Yonehama	米浜由圭	Semi-Miss Japan, Former Oita Broadcasting System Announcer
37th	2005	Risa Kanayama	金山梨紗	Semi-Miss Nippon, Fashion Model
38th	2006	Rena Hashimoto	橋本麗奈	Semi-Miss Nippon, Talent
39th	2007	Kana Maruta	丸田佳奈	Miss "Nature", Obstetrician and Gynecologist Model ·talent
39th	2007	Sayaka Kawamura	河村さやか	Miss Nippon "Marine Day", Weathernews presenter
39th	2007	Sayaka Kojima	小嶋沙耶香	Semi-Miss Nippon, Hiroshima Home Television Announcer
39th	2007	Sakiko Omura	大村咲子	Semi-Miss Nippon Active as a local talent in Nagasaki before receiving the award. Currently TV Nagasaki Announcer
39th	2007	Yuki Kojima	小島祐希	Semi-Miss Nippon Aomori TV Announcer
39th	2007	Ayumi Okawara	大河原あゆみ	Kanto area representative, Yamaguchi Broadcasting Announcer
40th	2008	Asami Okada	岡田亜沙美	Miss Nippon Nature, NHK Kumamoto Broadcasting Bureau Caster
40th	2008	Ranmai Yu	蘭舞ゆう	Semi-Miss Japan, former Takarazuka Revue affiliation
40th	2008	Sara Hosogai	細貝沙羅	Kanto area representative, former Fuji Television announcer
41st	2009	Konomi Kimura	木村好珠	Semi-Miss Nippon, talent
41st	2009	Ran Matsumoto	松本蘭	Miss Nippon Miss Kimono Violinist
42nd	2010	Yurina Takiguchi	瀧口友里奈	Kanto area representative, talent
42nd	2010	Kyoko Honda	本田恭子	Semi-Miss Nippon Talent, Tochigi Broadcasting Program Assistant, Tochigi Television Program MC, etc.
42nd	2010	Ami Suzuki	鈴木亜美	Miss Nippon "Marine Day" model
43rd	2011	Hisae Arai	新井寿枝	Miss Nippon Miss Kimono Painter, Fashion Model. Professional Baseball |The eldest daughter of a former player Hiromasa Arai, the sister of the 2012 Grand Prix Kiko Arai
43rd	2011	Yui Ugajin	宇賀神唯	Tohoku area representative, NHK Niigata Broadcasting Station presenter
44th	2012	Kana Ebisawa	海老澤佳奈	Miss Nippon Miss Kimono, Sponichi Special Award talent, Journey to Follow Basan Starring
44th	2012	Miho Sakai	酒井美帆	Miss Nippon "Water Angel" <First Winner>, TV Niigata Network Free from announcer. "International News 2018" (NHK BS1) Caster)
44th	2012	Mami Ando	安藤麻実	Semi-Miss Nippon KADOKAWA at the 28th Comic Essay Petit Awards <pen name "Ando Mami">. Her Miss Won the A Award for her manga "It's not a Miss Stake Miss" depicting her experience in Japan. "Until I'm a quasi-miss Japan with low communicative power", which was made into a book by the company, will be released on 2016 January 22
44th	2012	Moemi Katayama	片山萌美	Miss Nippon Nature Actress
45th	2013	Keaki Watanabe	渡辺けあき	Miss Nippon "Marine Day" Active Pro Bowler
45th	2013	Sayuri Iha	伊波紗友里	Kyushu / Okinawa area representative, worked at Radio Okinawa at the time of participation, then TBS News Bird after working as a caster, Ryukyu Asahi Broadcasting announcer
45th	2013	Moena Takegami	竹上萌奈	Miss Nippon Nature 2015 Kansai Telecasting Joined as an announcer
47th	2015	Airi Hatakeyama	畠山愛理	Shizuo Wada Special Award = No. 1 Winner Rhythmic Gymnastics Japan Representative
47th	2015	Mina Shibata	柴田美奈	Miss Nippon "Water Angel" 2018 Tokai Television Broadcasting Joined as an announcer
48th	2016	Rio Orimo	織茂璃穏	Miss Nippon Miss Kimono Actress "Orimorio" My father is Masao Orimo
48th	2016	Kotono Sugiura	杉浦琴乃	Miss Nippon "Marine Day" talent
The 49th	2017	Azusa Miyazaki	宮崎あずさ	Miss Nippon "Angel of Water" From 2018 NHK Announcer
50th	2018	Fumika Mizukusa (Fumika)	水草文香 （ふみか）	Finalist Gravure Idol
51st	2019	Marin Minamiya	南谷真鈴	Shizuo Wada Special Award No. 2 The youngest world in women's history Climbing the Seven Summits Explorer Grand Slam Achieved﹚
51st	2019	Nana Nishio	西尾菜々美	Semi-Miss Nippon / Miss Nippon "Water Angel" 2020 Nagoya Broadcasting Network Joined as an announcer
52nd	2020	Mikumo Moriya	森谷美雲	Miss Nippon "Marine Day" Sendai Television "Ara Ara Kashiko" Reporter → 2021 TV Kanazawa Announcer
52nd	2020	KOTONE AOKI	青木胡杜音	Miss Nippon "Kimono" Worked as a gravure idol after graduating from university.
53rd	2021	Kiyou Shimizu	清水希容	Shizuo Wada Special Award No. 3 Winner Karate Japan Representative
53rd	2021	Momoka Mine	嶺百花	Miss Nippon "Water Angel 2021" was selected as a weather reporter TBS Television (Japan) "THE TIME,"
53rd	2021	Nanase Takagaki	高垣七瀬	Miss Nippon "Miss Sports". She works as a dancer/performer and started her acting career from 2021.
55th	2023	Misaki Emura	江村美咲	Shizuo Wada Special Award No. 4 Winner Fencing 2022 World Championship Winner

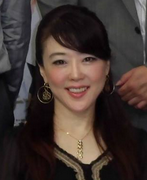
Miwa Sano (1992)

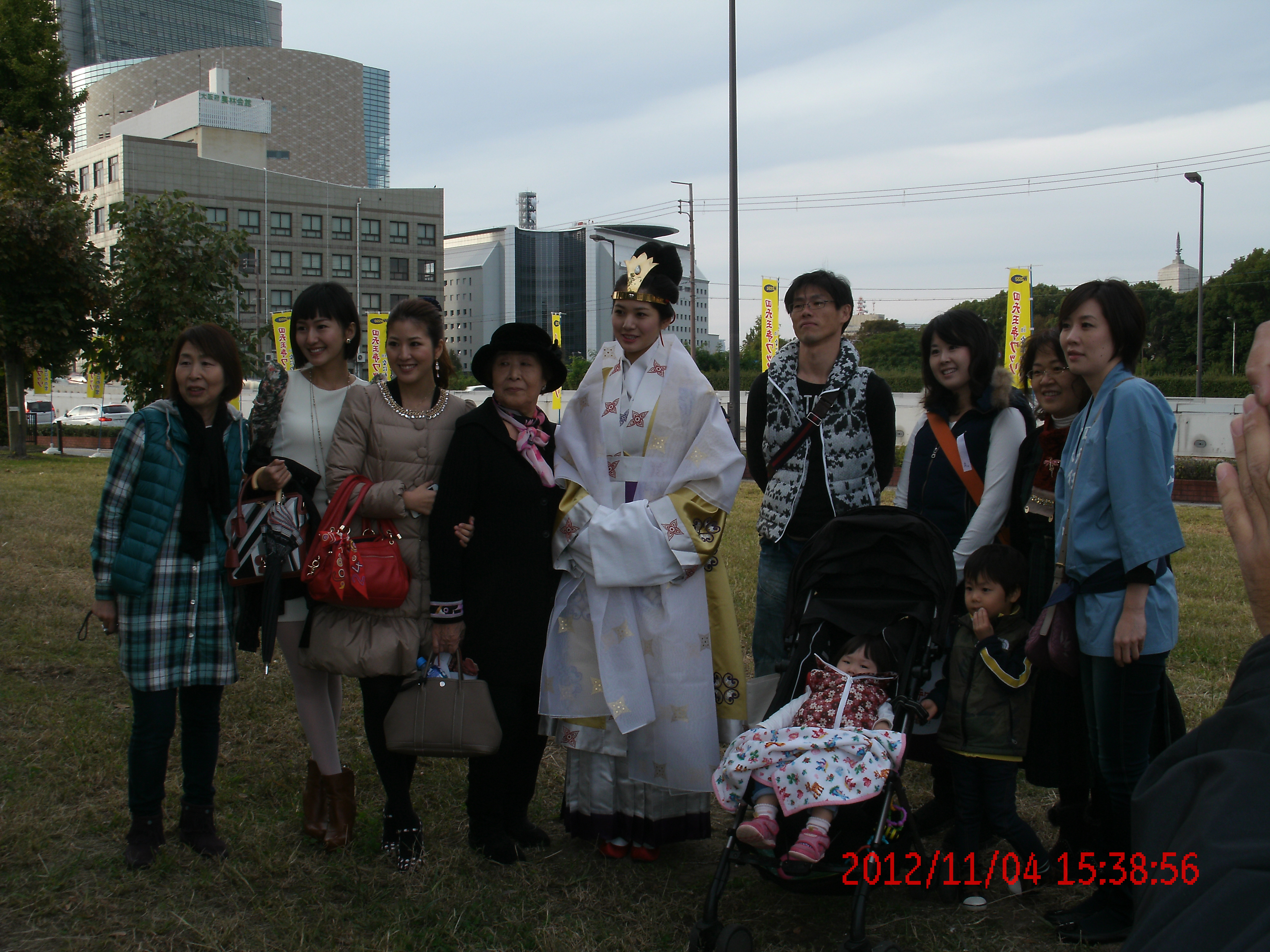
Hisae Arai (second from left, 2011 Miss Japanese Kimono) & Kiko Arai (center, 2012 Grand Prix)

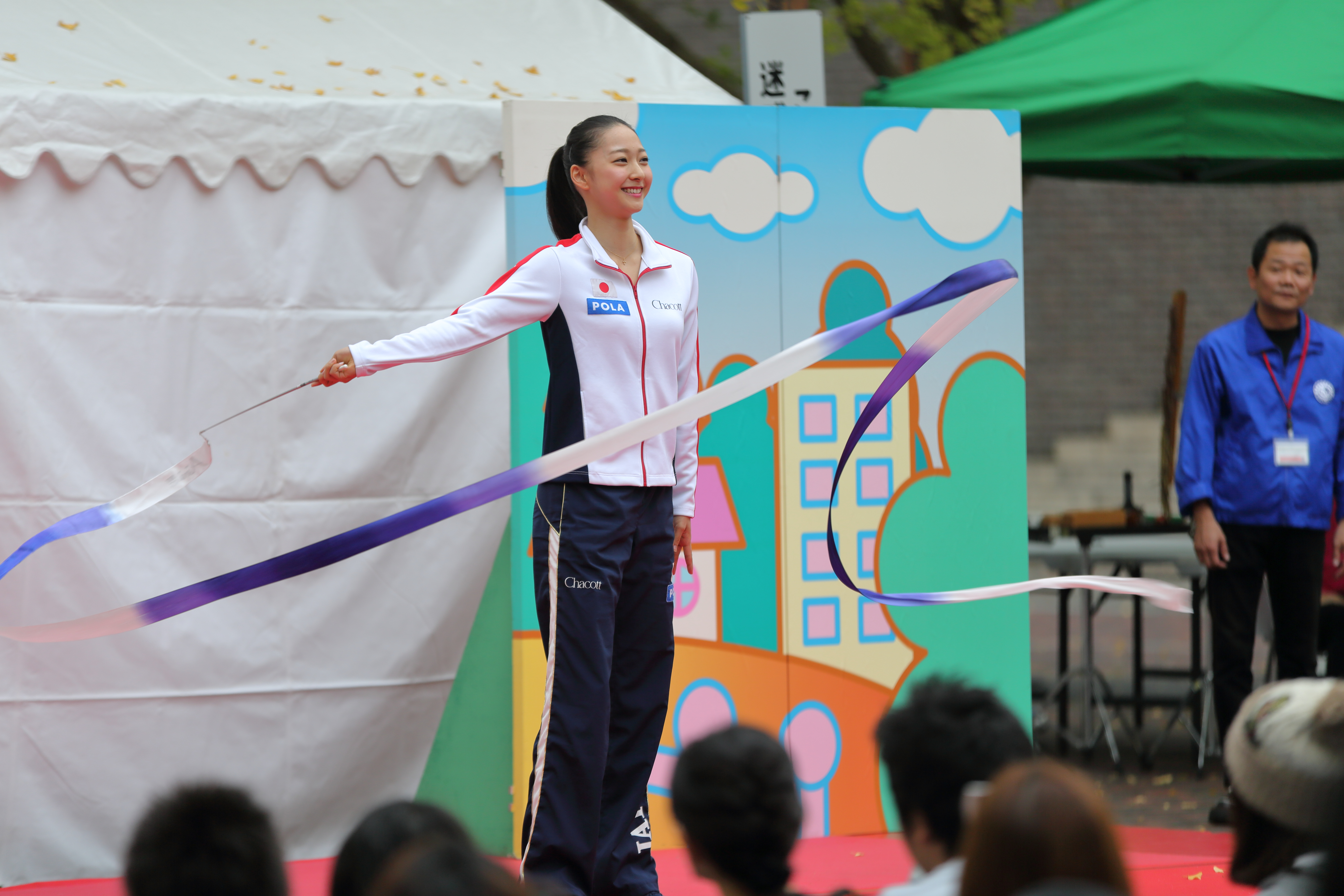
Airi Hatakeyama (2015 Shizuo Wada Special Award Miss Nippon)

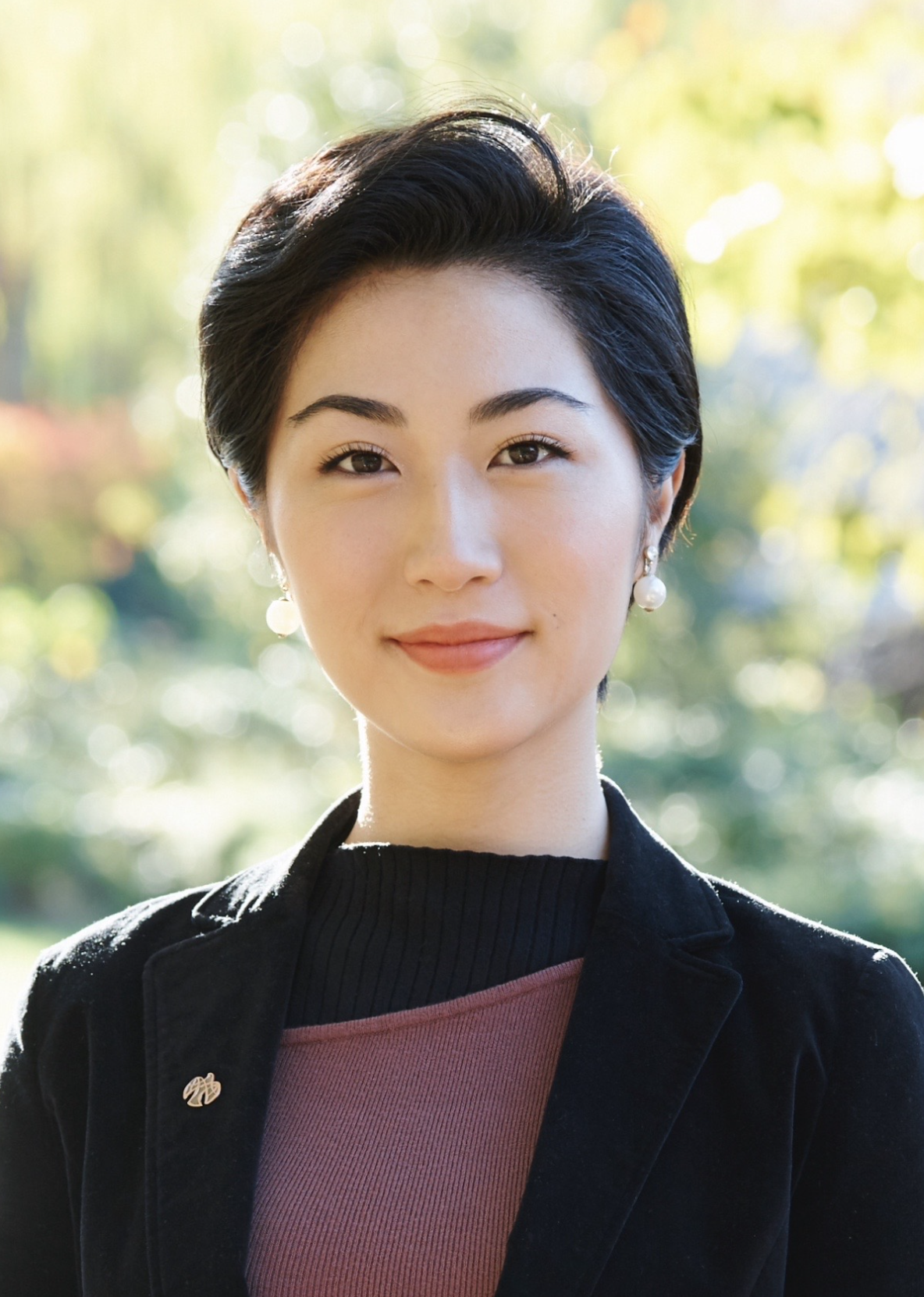
Marin Minamiya (2019 Shizuo Wada Special Award Miss Nippon)

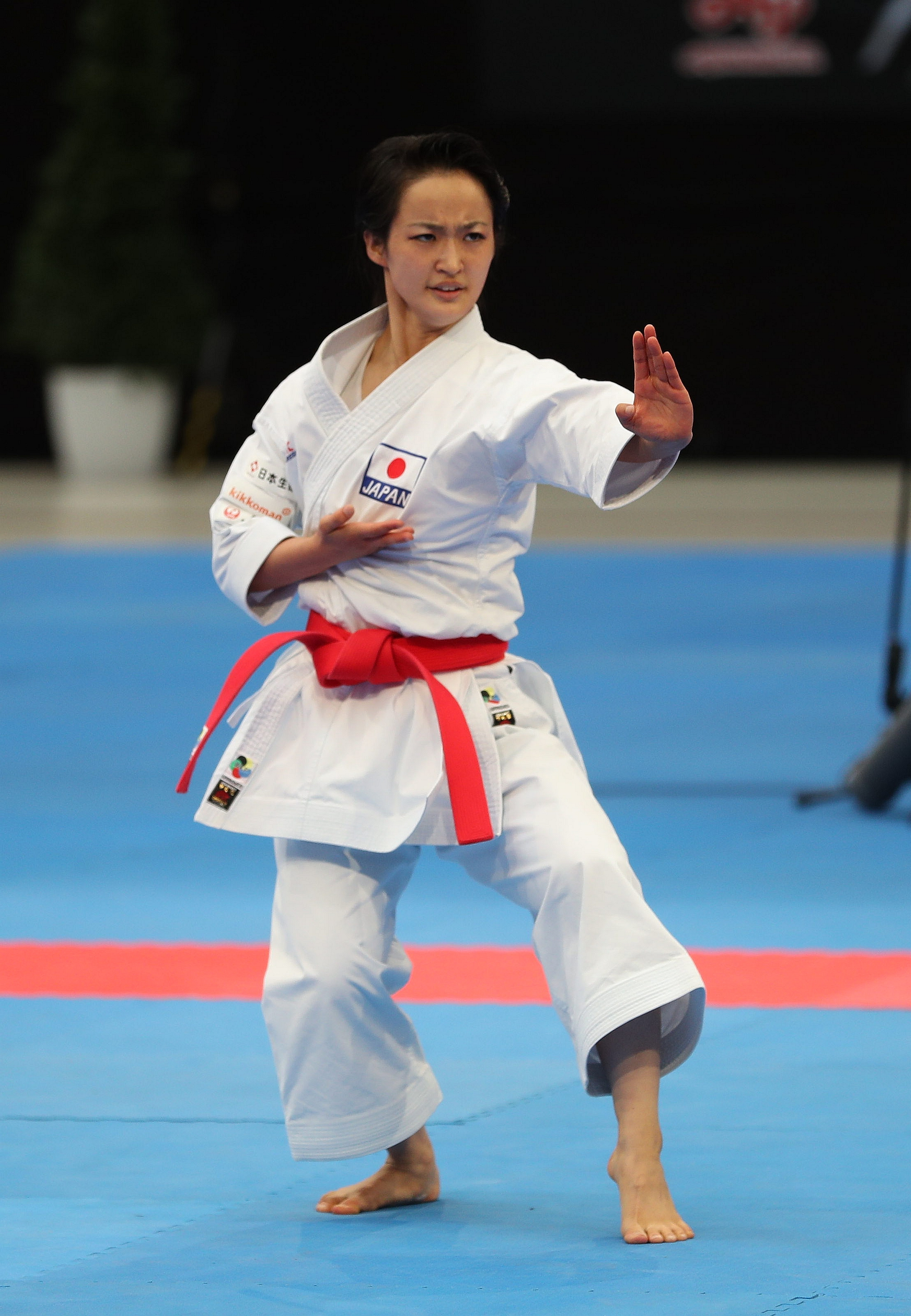
Kiyou Shimizu (2021 Shizuo Wada Special Award Miss Nippon)

History representative

Year	Representative	Japanese name	Award history
2013	Hisae Arai	新井寿枝	2011 Miss Kimono
2014	Marie Yanaka	谷中麻里衣	2011 Grand Prix
2015	Erika Suzuki	鈴木恵梨佳	2014 Grand Prix
2016	Chisato Haga	芳賀千里	2015 Grand Prix
2017	Mika Matsuno	松野未佳	2016 Grand Prix

== TV Show ==
- Ryutaro Ueoka is crazy! (TBS）
- The Wide (NTV)
- Sunday Jungle (TV Asahi)
- Pleasure MAP (TV Asahi)
- Mokuspe (NTV)
- Refreshing !! (NTV)
- Video Experience! Ikkimi Theater (KansaiTV)
- Dream Theater (FM Tokyo Tokyo Local)
- Solving your worries! After the rain Yorozu-do (YomiuriTV)
- What's wrong with me? (TBS)
- Akashiya pacific saury's career change DE vocation (NTV)

== Movie ==
- "Dream is the future you live in" (2018, Gachinko Film)
  - Produced to commemorate the 50th anniversary of Miss Nippon's resurrection in 2018. In 2016, it was drawn in close contact with the 48th tournament contest and its winners, with interviews with related parties.

== Books ==
- "Miss Nippon Beauty Diet" (Nihon Bungeisha Yuko Wada << Miss Nippon Contest Tournament Steering Committee Chair >> October 2002) ISBN 4537201649
- "Miss Nippon-style diet that has been passed down for 50 years" (Sanctuary Publishing, Yuko Wada << Miss Nippon Contest Tournament Steering Committee chairman >> January 22, 2010) ISBN 4861139384
- "Until I'm a little nerdy with low communicative power until I become a quasi-miss Japan" (KADOKAWA << 2012 quasi-miss Japan award >> January 22, 2016) ISBN 4040680723
- "Miss Nippon Beauty Food" (Shogakukan Miss Nippon Contest Secretariat, Ai Wada << Miss Nippon Contest Tournament Steering Committee chairman >> co-authored January 24, 2017) ISBN 9784093104593
- "50 Years of Japanese Beauty: What is the Beauty of the Showa, Heisei, and New Era?" (Modern Fire Department, Miss Nippon Association, January 17, 2019) JAN 4910029060397

- "Miss Nippon Revival 50th Anniversary Magazine" "Ai Wada Cover"

== See also ==
- Miss Universe Japan
- Miss International Japan
- Miss World Japan
- Miss Grand Japan
- Miss Earth Japan
- Mister Japan
- Japan Bishojo Contest
