= Sodefuri Au mo Tashou no En =

Studio album by Chicago Poodle
- Released: August 16, 2017
- Recorded: 2015–2017
- Genre: J-pop
- Label: Giza Studio
- Producer: Chicago Poodle

Chicago Poodle chronology
Life Is Beautiful (2014)	Sodefuri Au mo Tashou no En (2017)

Singles from Sodefuri Au mo Tashou no En
- 1. "Made In Smile" Released: 13 October 2015 (digital single)

Sodefuri Au mo Tashou no En (袖振り合うも多生の縁) is the upcoming fifth studio album by Japanese pop-rock band Chicago Poodle. It will release on 16 August 2017 by Giza Studio label.

== Background ==
The release gasp between their previous studio album, Life Is Beautiful, three years is the biggest during their career.

According to the interview on the question about main theme of the album is, "how the casual things in life happens to meet people who are complete strangers to us, yet there are possibilities of meeting them in previous life".

The album consists of previously one limited released single Made In Smile.

Heian no Bu Kyoto Bu and bonus track La・La・La Love & Peace has received album mix in this album. The original song was performed, written and arranged by Kouta Hanazawa. It was introduced during the music event Rimpa Rock (琳派ロック).

There was confirmed hole one man tour around the Japan with the same title as the album has, Sodefuri Au mo Tashou no En.

== Chart performance ==
The album reached No. 55 in Oricon Weekly Rankings in its first week.

== Track listing ==
All music is composed by Kouta Hanazawa

Sodefuri Au mo Tashou no En
No.	Title	Lyrics	Arranger(s)	Length
1.	"Tsunagu Mono (ツナグモノ)"	Norihito Yamaguchi	Hiroshi Asai (Sensation)	4:17
2.	"Free Bird"	Yamaguchi	Asai	3:55
3.	"Another Story"	Yamaguchi	Asai	4:06
4.	"Zutto Kirameku Kimi wa Boku no Diamond (ずっと煌めく君は僕のダイヤモンド)"	Yamaguchi	Chicago Poodle (strings arrangement: Tomoya Takasu)	4:40
5.	"Ai no Restaurant (愛のレストラン)"	Yamaguchi	Asai	3:35
6.	"Love Addict"	Yamaguchi, Kenji Tsujimoto	U-zo Ohkusu (Sensation)	3:39
7.	"PIN0625"	Tsujimoto	Asai	3:12
8.	"Made in Smile"	Yamaguchi	Hitoshi Okamoto (ex.Garnet Crow)	3:40
9.	"Pleasure/Toori Ame no Kaeri Michi (Pleasure/通り雨の帰り道)"	Tsujimoto	Ryo Miyazaki	3:36
10.	"Shooting Star"	Yamaguchi	Satoshi Iwakura	3:46
11.	"ふたりひとつ (ふたりひとつ)"	Yamaguchi	Ohkusu	4:36
12.	"Heian no Bu Kyotobu (平安の都 京都)" (Chicago Poodle ver.)	Hideki Kimura	Daiko Nagato, Yumeto Tsuresawa	9:03
13.	"La・La・La Love & Peace" (bonus track)	Kimura	Nagato, Tomoki Abe	4:40
Total length:				56:40

== Usage in media ==
- "Tsunagumono" was used in a commercial for The Iyo Bank in 2017
- "Made In Smile" was used in a commercial for The Iyo Bank in 2015
- "Futari Hitotsu" was used in a commercial for the product Quick Pon by Increase Hair
- "Heian no Bu Kyoto Bu/La・La・La Love & Peace" were used as no. 2 theme song for event Rimpa Rock
