= Chicago Poodle =

Japanese musical group

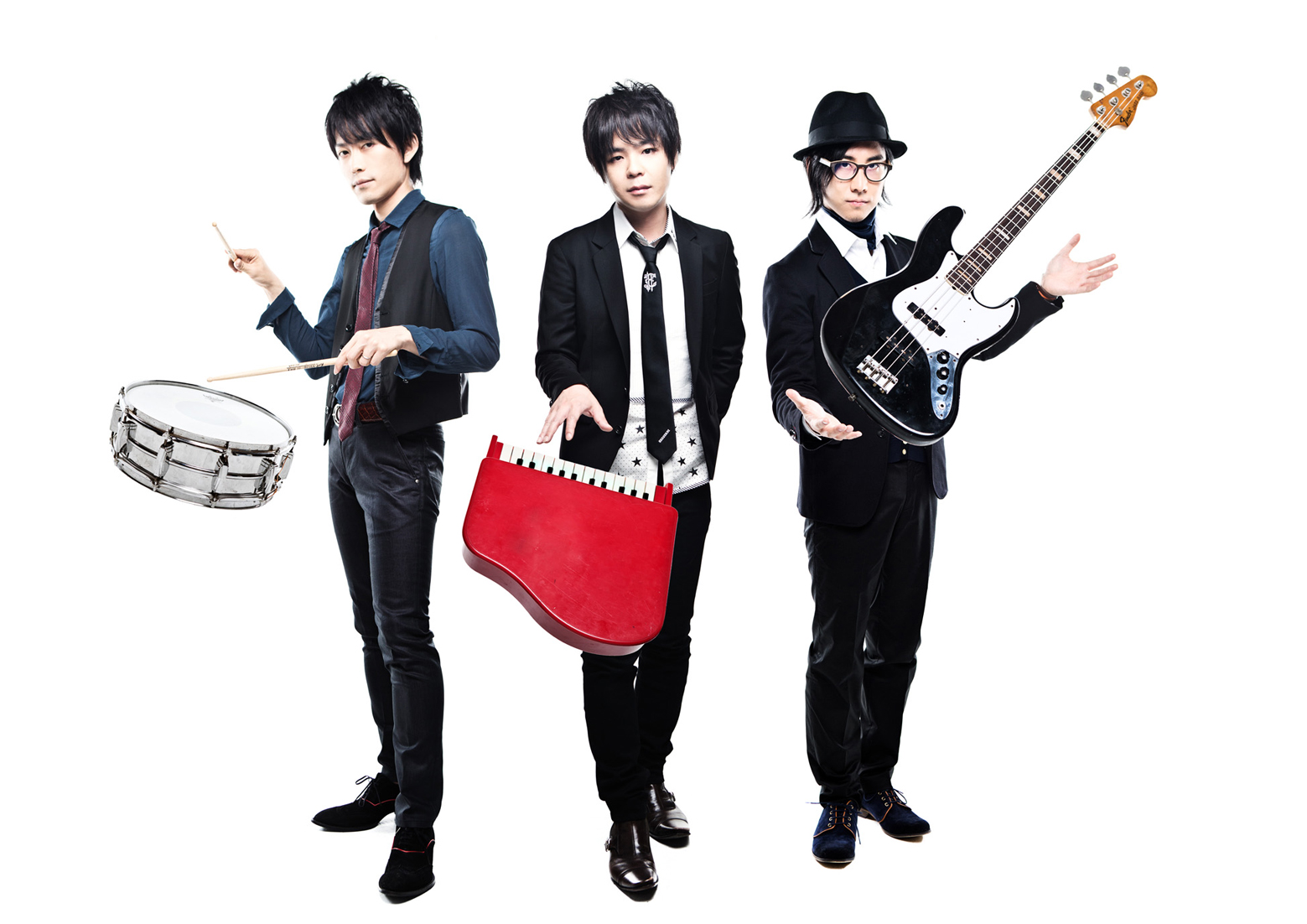

Background information
- Also known as: ChicaPoo (シカプー)
- Origin: Japan
- Genres: Pop, AOR
- Years active: 2000–present
- Labels: Tent House (2004-2009); Giza Studio (2009-2023); TK & Funny Music (2023-)
- Members: Kouta Hanazawa; Norihito Yamaguchi; Kenji Tsujimoto
- Past members: Hidenori Sugioka; Naoya Harada
- Website: Official website

YouTube information
- Channel: Chicago Poodle Official YouTube Channel
- Years active: 2016–present
- Subscribers: 1.49 thousand
- Views: 131 thousand
- Socials last updated: August 6, 2024

Chicago Poodle (Japanese: シカゴプードル, romanized: Shikago Pūdoru) is a Japanese three-piece piano band under the Giza Studio label.

== History ==
In April, 2000 the band formed at Doshisha University In October, 2003 they won the grand prix at Kyoto Festin in Country-Wide Student Music Contest In July, 2004 they made their debut with 'White mini album' on the indie label Tent House In August, 2006 Sugioka left the band. Since 2008 they regularly broadcast in FM Tokushima their own radio program Chicago Poodle no Radio Kaze ((シカゴプードルのラヂオ風)) On March 8, 2009 they've made major debut with single Odyssey in the label Giza Studio by distributors Being Inc.

On December 1, 2010, the band has participated in Christmas cover album "Christmas Non-Stop Carol" along with other Giza and Tent House artists. In 2011, they did their first hole one man live Inu (one) Fes 2011 in Osaka ~Bokura wo Tsunagumono~ On the same year, they've released their first compilation album "History I". In 2012, vocalist Kouta established his secret jazz solo project Ssllee with digital song Midousuji wo Arukou (御堂筋を歩こう) under D-Go Records. The activity after has been unknown. In 2013, they've released first anime theme song which was used for television series Detective Conan . Their 7th digital single Wonderful Days was dedicated to the vocalist Kouta's dog, which had died in 2018.

In 2023, they've announced departure from the label Giza Studio and from September became freelancers. The announcement was made on their official website and Yamaguchi´s blog as well. On the same day, a new official website was launched.

== Members ==
The band consist currently of three members:

- Kouta Hanazawa (花沢耕太) - vocalist, composer, pianist
- Norihito Yamaguchi (山口教仁) - drummer, lyricist
- Kenji Tsujimoto (辻本健司) - bassist, lyricist

=== Former Members ===
- Hidenori Sugioka (杉岡秀則)- former bassist, lyricist, left band in 2006
- Naoya Harada (原田直弥) - former keyboardist, lyricist, left band in 2002

== Discography ==
So far they've released 7 singles, 4 albums and 1 best album.

=== Albums ===
==== Studio albums ====
List of albums, with selected chart positions
Title	Album details	Peak positions
Title	Album details	JPN Oricon
"one"	Released: January 11, 2006; Label: Tent House; Formats: CD, digital download, streaming	-
"Piano Roman"	Released: June 8, 2008; Label: Tent House; Formats: CD, digital download, streaming	207
"Boku Tabi" (僕旅)	Released: November 11, 2009; Label: Giza Studio; Formats: CD, digital download, streaming	41
"GTBT"	Released: October 6, 2009; Label: Giza Studio; Formats: CD, digital download, streaming	54
"3.0"	Released: April 24, 2013; Label: Giza Studio; Formats: CD, digital download, streaming	73
"Life is Beautiful"	Released: September 24, 2014; Label: Giza Studio; Formats: CD, digital download, streaming	81
"Sodefuri Au mo Tashou no En" (袖振り合うも多生の縁)	Released: August 16, 2017; Label: Giza Studio; Formats: CD, digital download, streaming	55

==== Compilation albums ====
List of albums, with selected chart positions
Title	Album details	Peak positions
Title	Album details	JPN Oricon
"History 1"	Released: November 3, 2011; Label: Giza Studio; Formats: CD, digital download, streaming	58
"10th Anniversary Best"	Released: July 24, 2019; Label: Giza Studio; Formats: 2CD, 2CD+DVD, digital download, streaming	-

==== Extended plays ====
Title	Album details	Peak positions
Title	Album details	JPN Oricon
"White mini album"	Released: July 7, 2004; Label: Tent House; Formats: CD, digital download, streaming	-
"New Old Fashioned"	Released: January 26, 2005; Label: Tent House; Formats: CD, digital download, streaming	-
"Songs 4 one day EP"	Released: November 8, 2006; Label: Tent House; Formats: CD, digital download, streaming	153
"Kazegai Overture" (風街序曲)	Released: May 2, 2007; Label: Tent House; Formats: CD, digital download, streaming	-
"Pootleg"	Released: November 7, 2007; Label: Tent House; Formats: CD, digital download, streaming	-
"Jitsu Getsu Sei" (日月星)	Released: September 9, 2024; Label: TK & Funny Music; Formats: CD, digital download, streaming	-

=== Singles ===
List of singles, with selected chart positions
Year	Single	Peak chart positions	Album
Year	Single	JPN Physical	Album
2005	"Yume" (夢)	-	one
2007	"Ai Sansan" (愛燦燦)	173	Pianoroman
2009	"Odyssey"	58	Boku Tabi
2009	"Natsu Mellon" (ナツメロ)	71	Boku Tabi
2009	"Sayonara Baby" (さよならベイベー)	68	Boku Tabi
2010	"Fly: Kaze ga Fukinuketeiku" (〜風が吹き抜けていく〜)	75	GTBT
2011	"Sakurairo" (桜色)	46	History 1
2013	"Takaramono/Kimi no Egao ga nani yori mo Suki datta" (タカラモノ/君の笑顔がなによりも好きだった)	35	3.0/Life is Beautiful
2014	"Scenario no nai Life" (シナリオのないライフ)	62	Life is Beautiful
2015	"Made in Smile"	-	Sodefuri Au mo Tashou no En

=== Promotional singles ===
List of promotional singles, released digitally
Year	Single	Album	Reference
2010	"Ai to Shaberu Mono" (愛と呼べる言葉（もの）)	GTBT	
2010	"Is This LOVE?"	GTBT	
2012	"Arifureta Kyou no Tokubetsu na Bamen" (ありふれた今日の特別な場面)	3.0	
2012	"1225:Kimi ga Ita Christmas" (〜君がいたクリスマス〜)	3.0	
2013	"with/Sora Tooku" (空遠く)	Life is Beautiful	
2018	"Wonderful Days"	10th Anniversary Best	
2024	"Seira" (星羅)	Jitsu Getsu Sei	

=== Other appearances ===
List of non-studio album or guest appearances that feature Chicago Poodle
Title	Year	Artist	Album/Single
"Santa Claus Is Comin' to Town"	2010	V.A	Christmas Non-Stop Carol

== Magazine appearances ==
From Music Freak Magazine:

- 2005 January Vol.122
- 2006 February Vol.135
- 2006 April Vol.137
- 2006 November Vol.144
- 2007 May Vol.149
- 2007 August Vol.152
- 2007 November Vol.155
- 2008 March Vol.159
- 2008 May Vol.161
- 2008 June Vol.162
- 2009 February Vol.170
- 2009 March Vol.171
- 2009 April Vol.172
- 2009 May Vol.173
- 2009 June Vol.174
- 2009 July Vol.175
- 2009 August Vol.176
- 2009 September Vol.177
- 2009 November Vol.179

From Music freak magazine ES:

- March 2010 Vol.3
- September 2010 Vol.9
- December 2010 Vol.12
- January 2011 Vol.13
- February 2011 Vol.14
- March 2011 Vol.15
- April 2011 Vol.16
- May 2011 Vol.17
- June 2011 Vol.18
- July 2011 Vol.19
- August 2011 Vol.20
- September 2011 Vol.21
- October 2011 Vol.22
- November 2011 Vol.23
- December 2011 Vol.24
- January 2012 Vol.25
- February 2012 Vol.26
- March 2012 Vol.27
- April 2012 Vol.28
- May 2012 Vol.29
- June 2012 Vol.30
- July 2012 Vol.31
- August 2012 Vol.32
- September 2012 Vol.33
- October 2012 Vol.34
- November 2012 Vol.35
- December 2012 Vol.36
- April 2013 Vol.40
- May 2013 Vol.41
- July 2013 Vol.43
- August 2013 Vol.44
- January 2014 Vol.49
- July 2014 Vol.55
- September 2014 Vol.57
- February 2015 Vol.62
- May 2015 Vol.65

== Interview ==
From Natasha Inc.:

- Chicago Poodle 2009 "Boku Tabi"
- Chicago Poodle 2011 "Sakurairo"
- Chicago Poodle 2011 "History I"
- Chicago Poodle 2013 "3.0"
- Chicago Poodle 2013 "Takaramono/Kimi no Egao ga Nani yori Suki datta"
- Chicago Poodle 2014 "Scenario no Nai Life"

From Barks:

- Chicago Poodle 2013 "Takaramono/Kimi no Egao ga Nani yori Suki datta"
- Chicago Poodle 2014 "Scenario no Nai Life"
- Chicago Poodle 2014 "Life Is Beautiful"

From Billboard Japan:

- Chicago Poodle 2011 "History I"
- Chicago Poodle 2013 "Takaramono/Kimi no Egao ga Nani yori Suki datta"
- Chicago Poodle 2014 "Scenario no Nai Life"
- Chicago Poodle 2014 "Life Is Beautiful"

From Okmusic:

- Okmusic UP's vol.73
- Okmusic UP's vol.78
- Okmusic UP's vol.87
- Okmusic UP's vol.104
- Okmusic UP's vol.108
- Okmusic UP's vol.113
- Okmusic UP's vol.121
- Okmusic UP's vol.156

From Mfound:

- Chicago Poodle 2014 "Scenario no Nai Life"

From Keyboard Magazine:

- Chicago Poodle 2014 "Life Is Beautiful"

From Hot Express Music Magazine:

- Chicago Poodle 2009 "Sayonara Baby"
- Chicago Poodle 2009 "Boku Tabi"
- Chicago Poodle 2011 "History I"

From Skream:

- Chicago Poodle 2009/10
- Chicago Poodle 2009 "Oddysey"
- Chicago Poodle 2010/5
