= Life Is Beautiful (Chicago Poodle album) =

Life is Beautiful

Studio album by Chicago Poodle
- Released: September 24, 2014
- Recorded: 2013–2014
- Genre: J-pop
- Length: 44:20
- Label: Giza Studio
- Producer: Chicago Poodle

Chicago Poodle chronology
3.0 (2013)	Life is Beautiful (2014)	Sodefuri Au mo Tashou no En (2017)

Singles from Life is Beautiful
- 1. "Kimi no Egao ga Nani yori Suki datta" Released: 28 August 2013; 2. "with/Sora Tooku" Released: 11 November 2013; 3. "Scenario no Nai Life" Released: 5 February 2014

Life is Beautiful is the fourth studio album by Japanese pop-rock band Chicago Poodle. It was released on 24 September 2014 by Giza Studio label.

== Charting ==
The theme of the album is "life".

The album consists of previously one normal and two digitally released singles.

Several artist from Giza Studio such as Yumemoto Tsuresawa from Japanese rock band WAR-ED, Yuuzo Ohkusu from instrumental band Sensation or the former members of the Japanese pop band Garnet Crow, Hitoshi Okamoto and Hirohito Furui were involved with the album production.

== Charting ==
The album reached the #81 rank in Oricon for the first week. It charted for two weeks.

== Track listing ==
All music is composed by Kouta Hanazawa

Life is Beautiful
No.	Title	Lyrics	Arranger(s)	Length
1.	"Life is Beautiful"	Chicago Poodle	Chicago Poodle	1:03
2.	"Kotae Awase" (答エアワセ)	Norihito Yamaguchi	Satoshi Iwakura	3:01
3.	"Yumeiro Canvas" (夢色キャンバス)	Yamaguchi	Iwakura	4:22
4.	"Naitara Ee" (泣いたらええ)	Yamaguchi	Hitoshi Okamoto (ex. Garnet Crow)	3:49
5.	"Kimi no Egao ga Nani yori mo Suki datta" (君の笑顔がなによりも好きだった)	Tsujimoto, Yamaguchi	Iwakura	4:33
6.	"Good-bye, what a wonderful world"	Tsujimoto	Yuuzo Ohkusu	4:06
7.	"LaTaTa"	Tsujimoto	Yumeto Tsuresawa (WAR-ED)	4:11
8.	"Sora Tooku" (空遠く)	Tsujimoto	Chicago Poodle	4:18
9.	"with"	Yamaguchi	Hirohito Furui (ex. Garnet Crow)	5:40
10.	"Scenario no Nai Life" (シナリオのないライフ)	Yamaguchi	Chicago Poodle	4:35
11.	"Just My Special Lady"	Yamaguchi	Chicago Poodle	4:47

== Usage in media ==
- "Kimi no Egao ga Nani yori mo Suki datta" was used as the ending theme for TV anime Detective Conan.
- "Sceario no Nai Life" was used as the ending theme in February for the Tokyo Broadcasting System Television program Hiruopi!
- "Sora Tooku/with" was used as the theme song for the short movie Crash Hitsugi.
