= GTBT (album) =

Studio album by Chicago Poodle
- Released: October 6, 2010
- Recorded: 2010
- Genre: J-pop, rock
- Length: 41:49
- Label: Giza Studio
- Producer: Chicago Poodle

Chicago Poodle chronology
Boku Tabi (2009)	GTBT (2010)	History 1 (2011)

Singles from GTBT
- 1. "Ai to Shaberu Kotoba (Mono)" Released: 14 February 2010 (digital single); 2. "Fly ~Kaze ga Fukinuketeiku~" Released: 12 May 2010; 3. "Is This LOVE?" Released: 11 August 2010 (digital single)

GTBT is the second studio album by Japanese pop-rock band Chicago Poodle. It was released on 6 October 2010 by Giza Studio label.

== Background ==
GTBT literally means "Good Times Bad Times".

The album consists of three previously released singles, such as Ai to Shaberu Kotoba (Mono), Fly ~Kaze ga Fukinuketeiku~ and Is This LOVE?. The single Ai to Shaberu Kotoba is the first self-arranged song by the vocalist and composer Kouta Hanazawa.

== Charting ==
The album reached #54 rank in Oricon for first week and sold 1,777 copies. It charted for 2 weeks and sold 2,334 copies.

== Track listing ==
All the songs has been arranged by Chicago Poodle (except of #5, by Kouta Hanazawa)

All music is composed by Kouta Hanazawa

GTBT
No.	Title	Lyrics	Length
1.	"Is This LOVE?"	Kenji Tsujimoto	3:53
2.	"PEACE!!"	Tsujimoto	4:24
3.	"Kokoro Kimi Moyou (心キミ模様)"	Norihito Yamaguchi	4:01
4.	"No Regret"	Yamaguchi	4:36
5.	"Ai to Shaberu Kotoba (Mono) (愛と呼べる言葉（もの）)"	Kouta Hanazawa	2:46
6.	"Fly ~Kaze ga Fukinuketeiku~ (Fly 〜風が吹き抜けていく〜)"	Tsujimoto	4:16
7.	"30"	Tsujimoto	4:12
8.	"Ame Agari no Ballad (雨上がりのバラッド)"	Yamaguchi	3:30
9.	"film of life"	Yamaguchi	4:26
10.	"Ai no Tane (アイノタネ)"	Yamaguchi	5:46
Total length:			41:49

== Usage in media ==
- Is this LOVE? was used as ending theme for Nihon TV program Himitsu no Kenmin Show
- Fly ~Kaze ga Fukinuketeiku~ was used as theme song for Asahi Broadcasting Corporation program Kazoku Lesson
