= Kano sisters =

Japanese celebrities

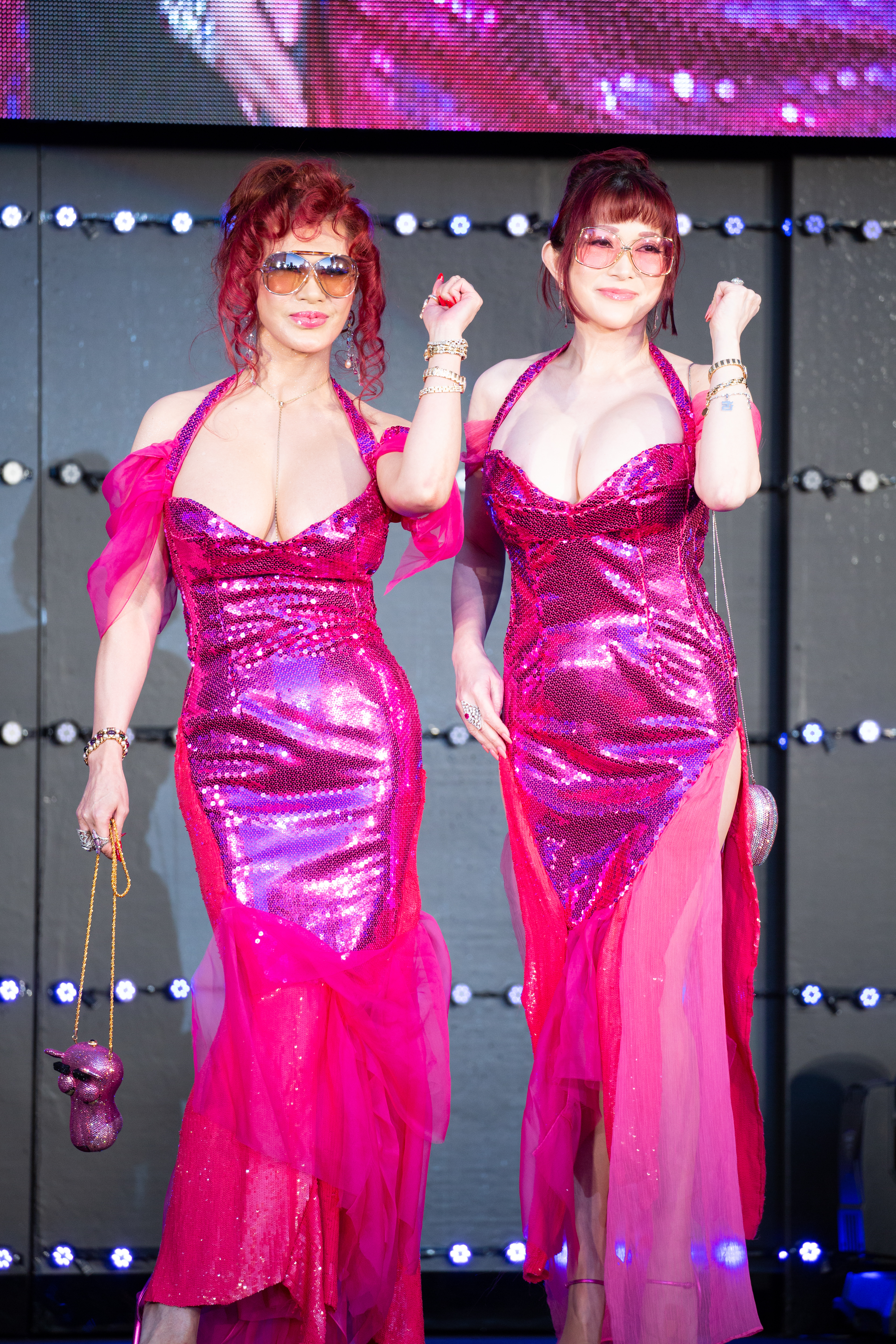
- Kyoko (left) and Mika (right) in April 2018
- Born: Kyoko Koyama; Osaka, Japan Mika Tamai; Saijō, Ehime, Japan
- Website: ameblo (in Japanese)

Kyoko Kano (叶 恭子, Kanō Kyōko) and Mika Kano (叶 美香, Kanō Mika), known collectively as the Kano sisters (叶姉妹, Kanō shimai), are Japanese media personalities.

== Early life and background ==
The Kano sisters say they are half-sisters with different mothers. There is also a third "sister" who initially made appearances with the two. She eventually withdrew from the scene, according to industry sources, and now only intermittently appears with them. The lack of resemblance between them as well as their refusal to answer any questions about their age (even their reported ages are speculation) or past fuels speculation the three are not sisters at all, but a group of tarento with a carefully crafted gimmick.

== Career ==
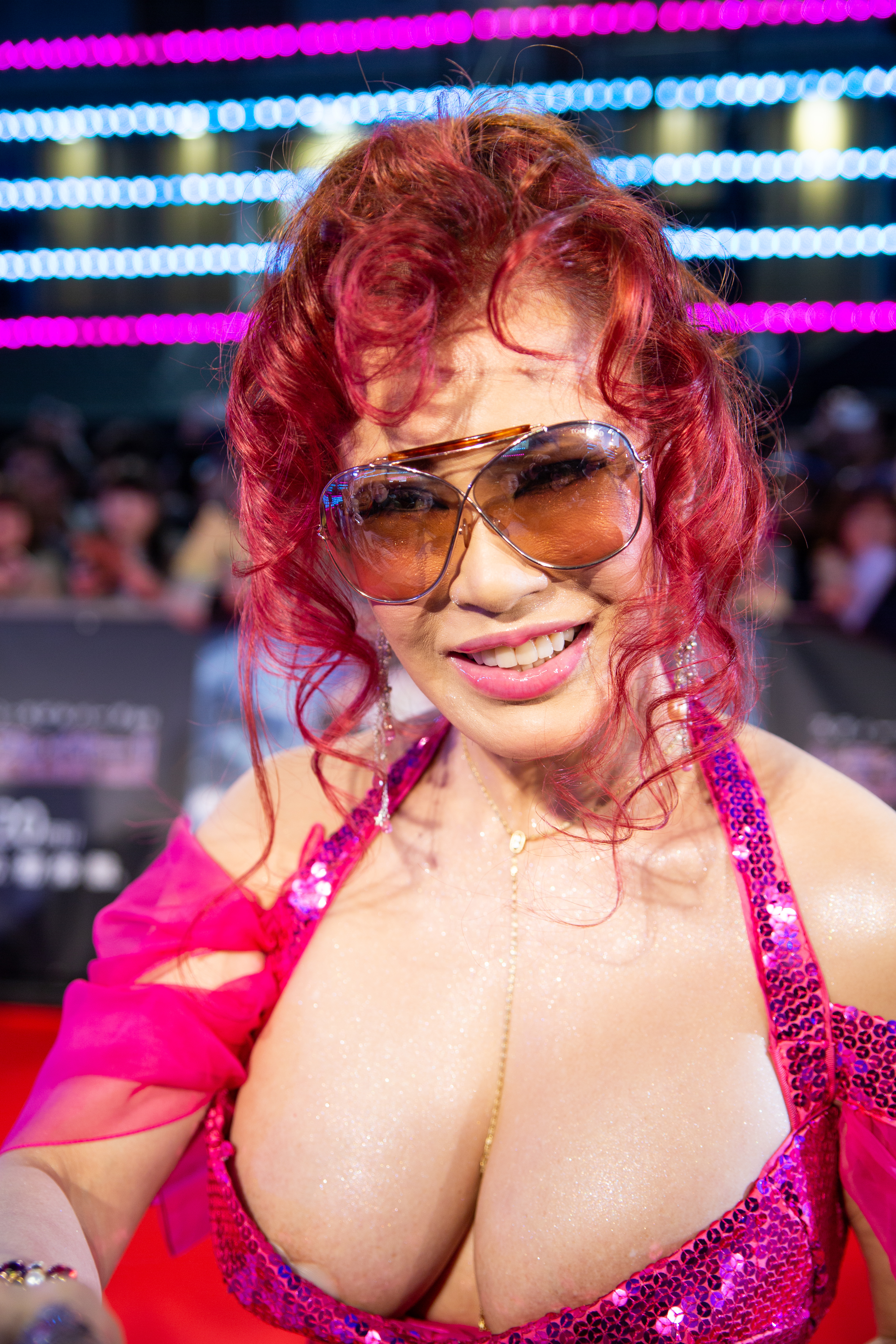

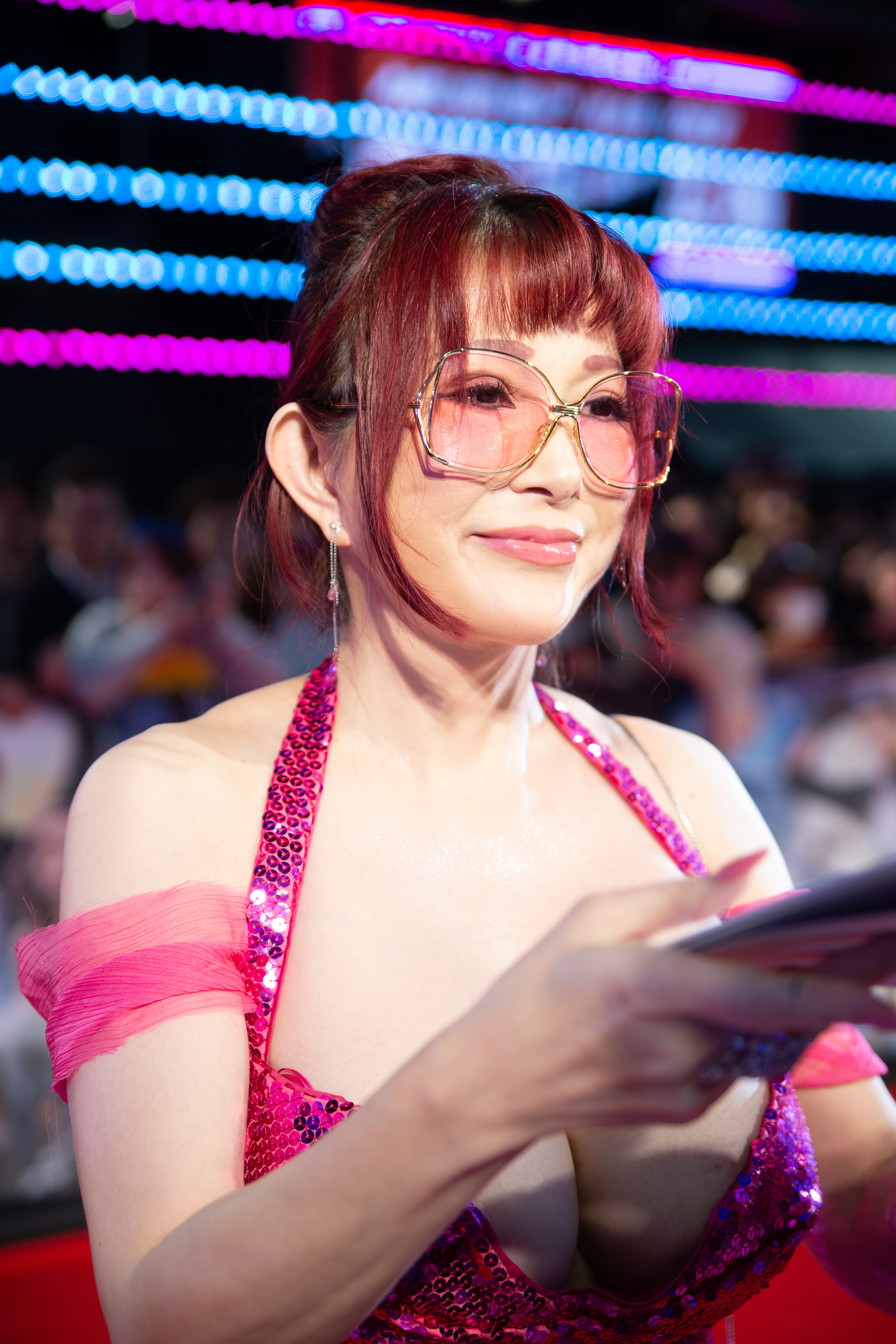
Kyoko (top) and Mika (bottom) at the Japanese premiere of Ready Player One in April 2018

Long before the Hiltons or the Kardashians got famous for being famous, Japan had been fascinated by the Kano sisters.

In 1997, the oldest sister Kyoko debuted in 25ans, an upscale women's fashion magazine, together with her real (younger) sister H.K. as one of its "supaa dokusha" (super readers). This success led to various TV offers. H.K. did not seek a life in the spotlight, which led to great resentment and disappointment by Kyoko and ended in a family feud in 2007. She eventually moved abroad and made a career – away from the Japanese spotlight – in beauty, high jewelry and exclusive F&B concepts.

Kyoko created a story of "half-sister" Mika. Since then, Kyoko and Mika are known as the "Kano shimai" (Kano sisters). Mika, a beauty queen at age 19, had been seeking fame. With money from Kyoko's family, both "sisters" began appearing regularly on Japanese TV. Their claim to fame is their sense of style, involving revealing clothes, jewelry, and jet-set travel.

Apart from frequent television appearances, they market a series of exercise videos, erotic calendars, collectible fashion cards and coffee-table pictorials, featuring the two mostly naked. Japanese toy maker Takara Co. began to sell 30-centimeter-high dolls modeled after the Kano sisters, called Kano Sisters' Gorgeous Dolls, in March 2002. The dolls were priced at 19,800 yen a pair.

The sisters are frequently invited to movie premieres, film festivals, and award ceremonies. Self-described "lifestyle consultants", Japanese women pay to attend Kano seminars to hear their advice on topics such as relationships and makeup.

On 3 April 2006, the Kano sisters published a collection of nude artistic photographs in a book entitled Sweet Goddess. Posing in a revealing style known in Japanese as "hea nuudo" (or "hair nude"), a term for nude photographs in which a woman's pubic hair is visible, the photographs were taken by Kyoko Kano with modeling by Mika Kano. Sweet Goddess was reported to be among the first books to break this unwritten post-war publication rule. Sweet Goddess was listed as a bestseller for several months. The Kano sisters released a similar pictorial collection entitled Sweet Goddess 2 on 1 November 2006.

In 2009, the Kano sisters had a 10-episode CGI anime series called Abunai Sisters: Koko & Mika produced by Production I.G, which aired on the Japanese channel AT-X, but it was cancelled after two episodes had aired. The rest of the series was released on DVD. The series was in English with Japanese subtitles.

=== Kyoko Kano as author ===
On 1 January 2000, Kano released an autobiography, Millennium Muse with an introduction by non-fiction writer Yuko Kobayashi. The book included full color photographs of her posing with younger sister and discusses Kano's background and philosophy on life, love, men, money and sex. Some in the media panned the writing as amateurish. The book became an Asahi Shimbun bestseller. Six years later, Kano followed it up with Toriorizumu, a non-fiction work that elaborates on these themes. Writing in the Shūkan Post, she describes all 30 chapters and 237 pages as a "personal record experiencing a 'type of love without taboos.'"

== Lawsuits ==
=== Defamation ===
In April 2000, author Shigeru Sato published an unauthorized biography of Kyoko Kano in which he depicted her lifestyle from the viewpoint of a pet cat. Kano sued the author for defamation. In September 2001, the Tokyo District Court ordered the author to pay Kano damages, for infringing on Kano's privacy and dishonoring her reputation. In handing down the ruling, Presiding Judge Yoshihiro Katayama said that Sato used "blunt and excessive" expression in portraying Kano."

In August 2005, Kyoko and Mika Kano sued Japanese actress Miri Okada for defamation based on Okada's televised June 2005 claim that the two sisters unsuccessfully tried to seduce Okada's husband, Norio Yaginuma. The sisters were awarded compensation by the Tokyo District Court in July 2006. Judge Shigehiro Ishikawa ruled, "[Okada's] claims were groundless and she neglected in her duty to ask that they not be broadcast."

=== Teruo incident ===
Teruo K., father of Kyoko Kano, allegedly accosted the Kano sisters with an umbrella in a Tokyo underground parking lot complex on 25 December 2007, after the sisters had allegedly refused to pay him back an undisclosed amount of money. The money was lent by Teruo to Kyoko more than 15 years ago. He was arrested for intimidation, accused of violating the law concerning punishment for physical violence.

Following the incident, on 11 January 2008, Kyoko Kano filed a defamation lawsuit in compensatory damages against weekly news magazine Shukan Shincho in the Tokyo District Court. According to the petition, the magazine's 17 January issue would run an article accusing the Kano sisters of duplicity. The magazine article alleged that "While Kyoko [Kano] had borrowed money from her father, she failed to repay the debt." The plaintiff insisted that it was the father who persistently asked for money, commenting that "such erroneous reporting could damage her reputation." The editorial staff at Shukan Shincho would not comment on the lawsuit.

== Bibliography ==
Written by Kyoko Kano

- Millennium Muse (in Japanese). Tokyo: Gentosha. 2000. ISBN 4-87728-347-1.
- Toriorizumu (in Japanese). Tokyo: Shogakkan. 2006. ISBN 4-09-396471-8.
- Super Beauty: Love & Sex (in Japanese). Tokyo: Shogakkan. 2007. ISBN 978-4-09-379748-1.

== See also ==
- List of Japanese celebrities
- List of Japanese people

Preceded by Keiko Ibi	Miss Nippon (Mika Tamai); 1988	Succeeded by Norie Sawamoto
