= Mika Hagi =

Japanese model

Mika Hagi (萩 美香, Hagi Mika; born September 27, 1983 in Tsu, Mie) is the 2007 winner of the Miss Nippon contest selected out of 3000 girls held by a diet gym company. The 2007 was her 3rd challenge. She graduated from Mie University. She moved to Tokyo to graduate the graduate school at Rikkyo University. She is currently working as a TV actress living in Tokyo, mainly working for a MieTV local sightseeing program.
