= Boku Tabi =

Studio album by Chicago Poodle
- Released: November 11, 2009
- Recorded: 2009
- Genre: J-pop, rock
- Length: 45:53
- Label: Giza Studio
- Producer: Chicago Poodle

Chicago Poodle chronology
Piano Roman (2008)	Boku Tabi (2009)	GTBT (2010)

Singles from Boku Tabi
- 1. "Oddysey" Released: 18 March 2009; 2. "Natsu Mellon" Released: 8 July 2009; 3. "Sayonara Baby" Released: 7 October 2009

Boku Tabi (僕旅) is the debut studio album by Japanese pop-rock band Chicago Poodle. It was released on 11 November 2009 by Giza Studio label.

== Background ==
After the five years of the indies activity they moved from indies label Tent House to major label Giza Studio owned by Being Inc. distributors. It makes their first album released by this label.

The album consists of three previously unreleased singles, such as Odyssey, Natsu Mellon and Sayonara Baby.

Two months before the album release, on September the tracks Bye Bye, Natsu Mellon and Oddysey (only 1 chorus) were included in Tsutaya limited rental album "Chicago Poodle Choi Kiki CD".

== Charting ==
It reached #41 rank in Oricon for first week and sold 2,931 copies. It charted for 3 weeks and sold 4,861 copies.

== Track listing ==
All the songs has been arranged by Chicago Poodle

All music is composed by Kouta Hanazawa

Boku Tabi
No.	Title	Lyrics	Length
1.	"Odyssey"	Kenji Tsujimoto	4:02
2.	"Hallelujah (ハレルヤ)"	Tsujimoto	4:32
3.	"Sayonara Baby (さよならベイベー)"	Tsujimoto	4:40
4.	"Utakata (泡沫)"	Norihito Yamaguchi	4:27
5.	"Sora no Ao (空の青)"	Kouta Hanazawa; Yamaguchi	2:27
6.	"Natsu Mellon (ナツメロ)"	Yamaguchi	4:24
7.	"Bye Bye. (バイバイ。)"	Tsujimoto	3:46
8.	"Ai Ai (アイアイ)"	Yamaguchi	4:17
9.	"Superstar (スーパースター)"	Tsujimoto	3:58
10.	"Tabibito (旅人)"	Yamaguchi	5:32
11.	"Yakusoku (約束})"	Yamaguchi	3:51

== In media ==
- Hallelujah was used as ending theme for March of TV Kanazawa program "Tonari no TV Kinchan"
- Tabi Bito was used as ending theme for TV Tokyo program "Golf no Shizui"
- Oddysey was used as ending theme for TV Tokyo program "JAPAN COUNTDOWN"
- Natsu Mellon was used as ending theme for July of Sanyo Broadcasting program "Yutanpo"
- Sayonara Baby was used as ending theme for September of TV Kanazawa program "Tonari no TV Kinchan"
