= Marie Yanaka =

Japanese beauty pageant winner (born 1990)

Marie Yanaka (谷中 麻里衣; born August 30, 1990 in Tokyo) is a Japanese news caster, commentator, journalist and the 2011 winner of the Miss Nippon ("Miss Japan" in Japanese) beauty pageant. She graduated from the faculty of law at Keio University.

== Biography ==
Yanaka spent much of her youth with her family posted in other countries. She spent four years in Singapore, and another four years in the United States. Her father was working near the World Trade Center on September 11, 2001. She says following the news, that day, while waiting to learn if her father was safe, was what inspired her to become a newscaster.

She was hired as one of the host's of business oriented television show in September 2011.

French jeweller Louis Golay International designed Yanaka's tiara.

She is also a television journalist, and currently anchors at CNBC Japan (known as Nikkei CNBC in Japan). She later started working at NHK World as well.

On April 1, 2014, Yanaka, and two other women, were named as brand ambassadors for a line of women's apparel. Yanaka and the two other women, were anchorwomen, and the line of clothing was designed to appeal to women who wanted to look like anchorwomen.

On Monday 1 September 2026 Yanaka Marie said she was leaving the show and company.
