= 3.0 (Chicago Poodle album) =

Studio album by Chicago Poodle
- Released: April 24, 2013
- Recorded: 2012–2013
- Genre: J-pop, rock
- Length: 50:19
- Label: Giza Studio
- Producer: Chicago Poodle

Chicago Poodle chronology
History 1 (2011)	3.0 (2013)	Life is Beautiful (2014)

Singles from 3.0
- 1. "Arifureta Kyou no Tokubetsu na Bamen" Released: 3 October 2012; 2. "1225 ~Kimi ga Ita Christmas~" Released: 28 November 2012

3.0 is the third studio album by Japanese pop-rock band Chicago Poodle. It was released on 24 April 2013 by Giza Studio label.

== Background ==
The album consists of two previously digitally released singles, such as Arifureta Kyou no Tokubetsu na Bamen and 1225 ~Kimi ga Ita Christmas~. Takaramono is the coupling song of their single Kimi no Egao ga Naniyori Sukidatta. The single itself is released in their next album Life Is Beautiful.

== Charting ==
The album reached #73 rank in Oricon for first week and sold 1,342 copies. It charted only 1 week.

== Track listing ==
All the tracks has been arranged by Chicago Poodle.

All music is composed by Kouta Hanazawa

3.0
No.	Title	Lyrics	Length
1.	"Tomoshi tou (ともし灯)"	Norihito Yamaguchi	4:20
2.	"More Soul Train"	Yamaguchi	4:31
3.	"Kirameki Runner (煌ランナー)"	Yamaguchi	5:04
4.	"Takaramono (タカラモノ)"	Yamaguchi	5:26
5.	"COCKTAIL SKETCH (カクテルスケッチ)"	Kenji Tsujimoto	4:28
6.	"Mister Baby (ミスターベイベー)"	Yamaguchi	3:55
7.	"Oyasumi (おやすみ)"	Yamaguchi	1:49
8.	"Amenochi Taiyou (雨のち太陽)"	Tsujimoto	3:30
9.	"Taika Ron (退化論)"	Tsujimoto	3:13
10.	"1225~Kimi ga Ita Christmas~ (1225 ～君がいたクリスマス～)"	Tsujimoto	3:57
11.	"Tsuyo Mushi (ツヨムシ)"	Yamaguchi	4:26
12.	"Arifureta Kyou no Tokubetsu na Bamen (ありふれた今日の特別な場面)"	Tsujimoto	4:56

== In media ==
- Kirameki Runner was used as commercial song for The Iyo Bank, Ltd.
- Takaramono was used as image song for 100th anniversary of Megane Tanaka company
