= TV Kanazawa =

Television Kanazawa Corporation
- Trade name: Television Kanzawa
- Native name: 株式会社テレビ金沢
- Romanized name: Kabushikigaisha Terebikanazawa
- Type: Kabushiki gaisha
- Industry: Television broadcasting
- Founded: August 1, 1989; 37 years ago
- Headquarters: 2-136 Kobu, Kanazawa City, Ishikawa Prefecture, Japan
- Key people: Kazuo Tsukita (President and CEO)
- Website: tvkanazawa.co.jp
- Footnotes; Data from its Company Profile

JOWX-DTV
- Ishikawa Prefecture; Japan
- City: Kanazawa
- Channels: Digital: 17 (UHF); Virtual: 4
- Branding: KTK

Programming
- Affiliations: Nippon News Network and Nippon Television Network System

Ownership
- Owner: Television Kanazawa Corporation

History
- First air date: April 1, 1990
- Former call signs: JOWX-TV (1990–2011)
- Former channel numbers: Analog: 33 (UHF, 1990–2011)

Technical information
- Licensing authority: MIC

Links
- Website: Official site

Television Kanzawa Corporation (株式会社テレビ金沢, Kabushiki-gaisha TV Kanazawa), also known as KTK, is a Japanese broadcast network affiliated with the Nippon News Network (NNN) and Nippon Television Network System (NNS). Their headquarters are located in Ishikawa Prefecture.

== History ==
- 1990 April It was set up third broadcasting station of Ishikawa Prefecture.
- 2006 July Digital terrestrial television was started (Kanazawa Main Station).
