= National Institute of Public Health of Japan =

Japanese research and health institute

Coordinates: 35°38′21″N 139°43′36″E

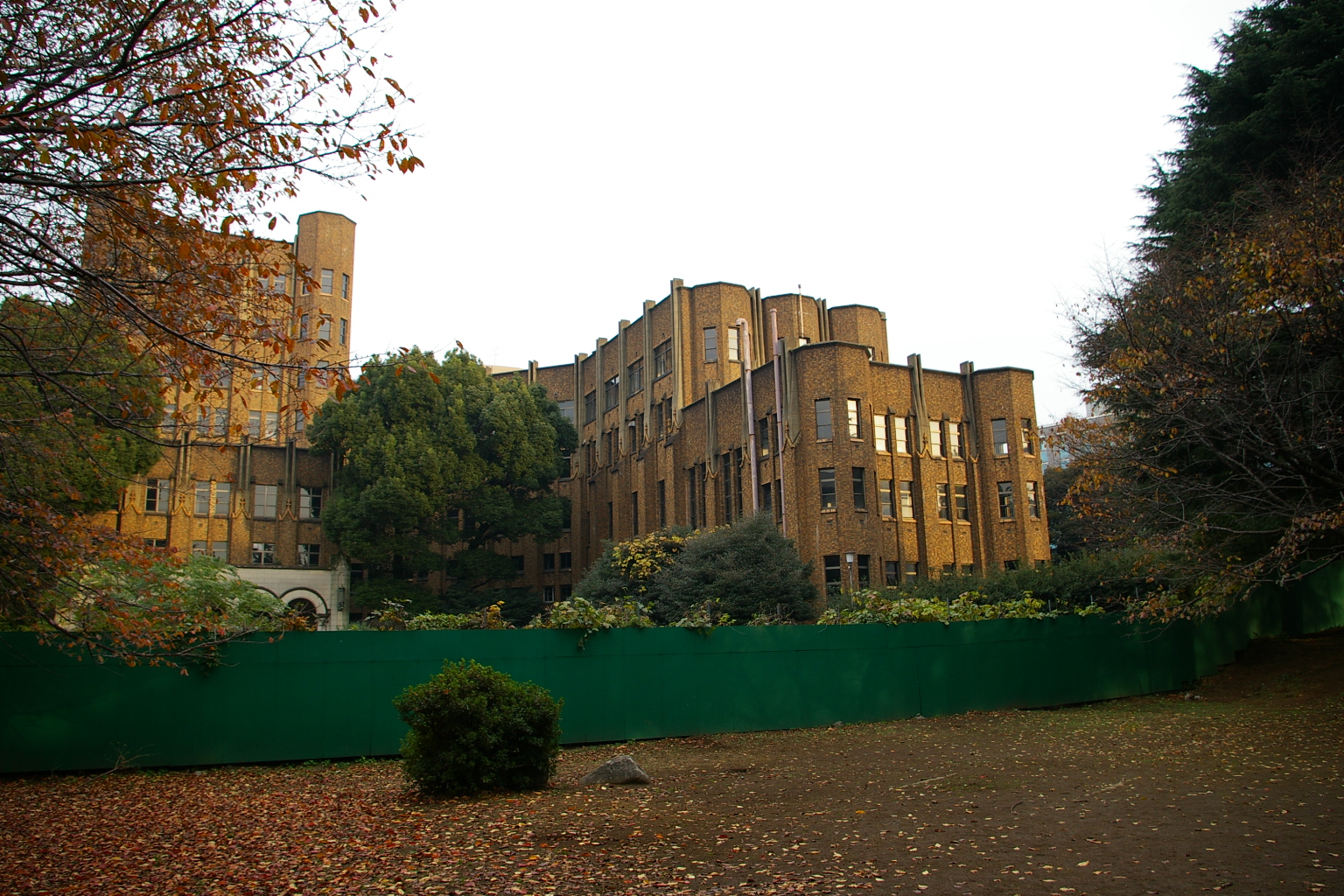
Former National Institute of Public Health.

The National Institute of Public Health of Japan (国立保健医療科学院, Kokuritsu Hoken-Iryō Kagakuin) is a government research and training organization charged with improving public health in Japan.

== Mission ==
The institute was established in 2002 as part of a reorganization of national health organizations. It integrates the former Institute of Public Health, the former National Institute of Health Services Management, and part of the Department of Oral Science from the National Institute of Infectious Disease. It is located in the city of Wakō in Saitama Prefecture.

The mission of the institute is to train professionals working in the fields of public health, environmental hygiene, and social welfare, and to conduct research in those areas. It is divided into 15 research and education departments, and houses an information center that distributes periodic bulletins to more than 2000 institutions in Japan and overseas.

In 2005, about 4,300 trainees attended educational programs at the institute.

== History ==
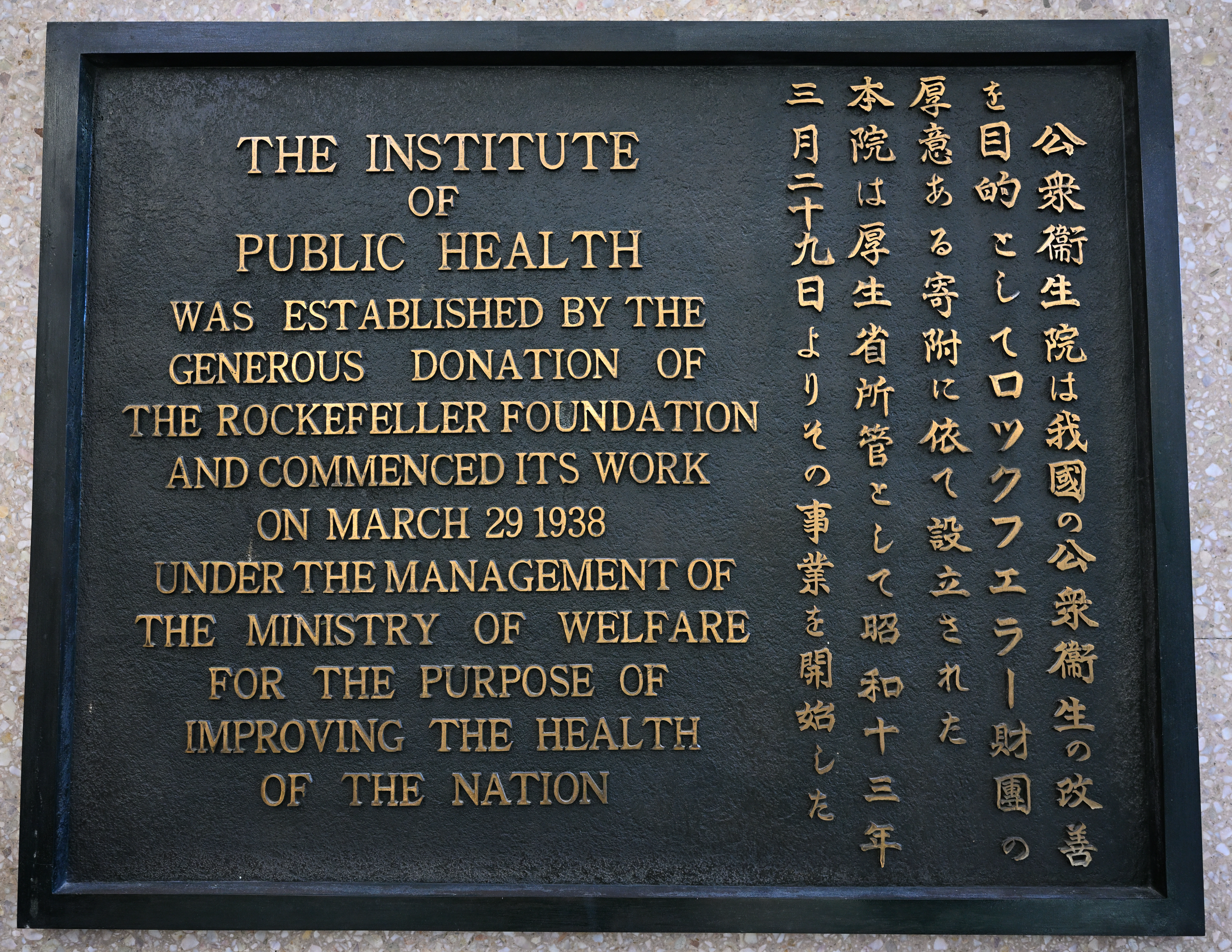
Commemorative plaque in former Institute of Public Health

- 1938: The Institute of Public Health was founded under the jurisdiction of the Ministry of Health and Welfare.
- 1940: Renamed the Welfare National Science Laboratory and merged with a nutritional institute under the jurisdiction of the Interior Ministry.
- 1942: Integrated into the Health and Welfare Research Laboratory, under the jurisdiction of the Ministry of Health and Welfare.
- 1946: Reestablished as the Institute of Public Health.
- 2002: Reorganized as the National Institute of Public Health and moved to Wako.
- 2018: Former building in Shirokanedai, Minato renovated as a municipal complex.

== Former building ==
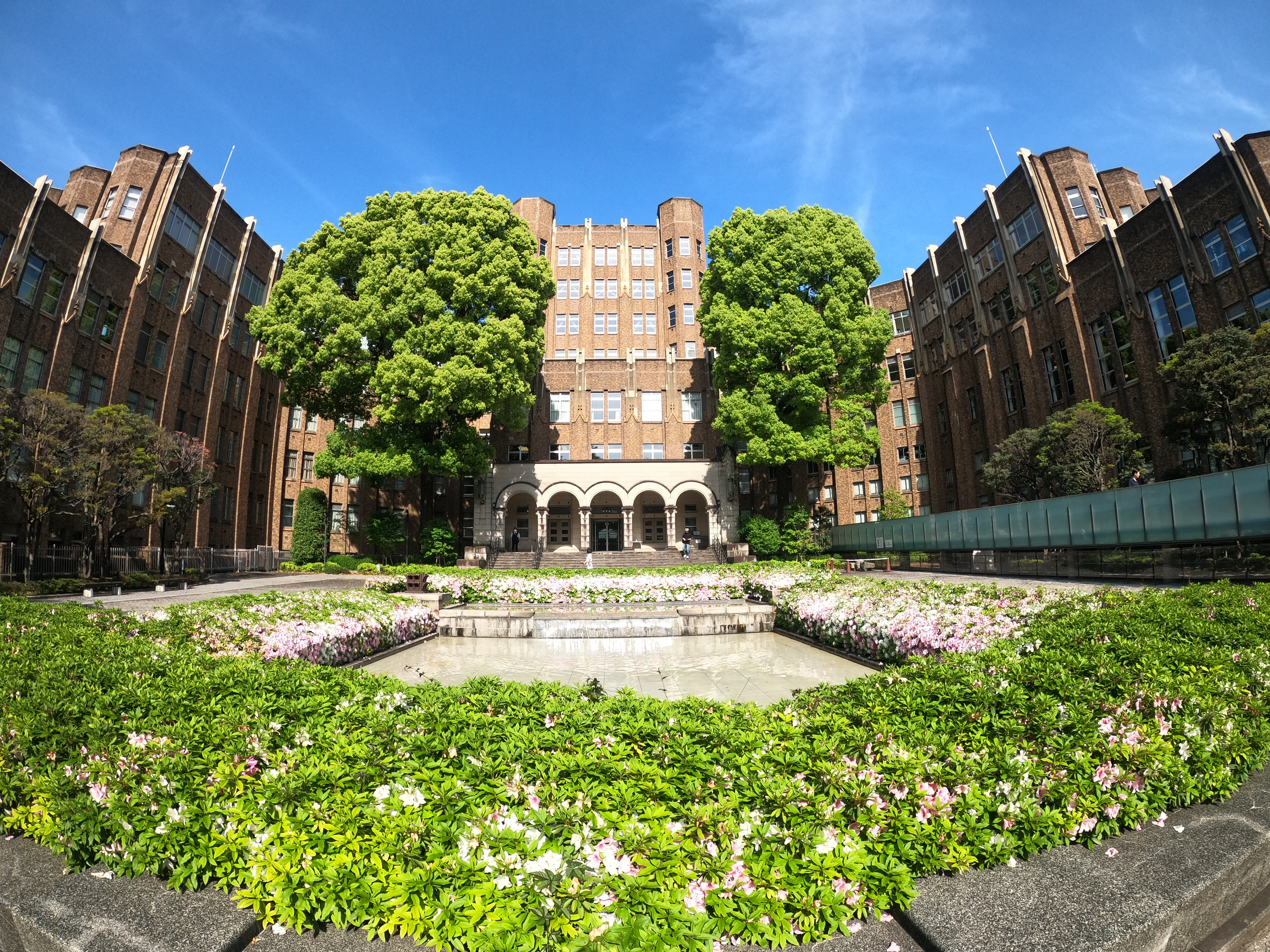
Front view of former building

The former building of the institute was designed by architect Yoshikazu Uchida and was built in the Shirokanedai district of Tokyo with financial assistance from the American Rockefeller Foundation. It has been designated a historic structure by the Architectural Institute of Japan in 1982. The building was abandoned long time after the institute's moving, but Minato Ward bought in 2009 and renovated in 2018 as a complex including museum of local history, home palliative service station, after-school children's day-care center, and child care consulting office.

== See also ==
- The Institute of Medical Science
- List of national public health agencies
