= Shirokanedai =

Coordinates: 35.6379°N 139.7261°E

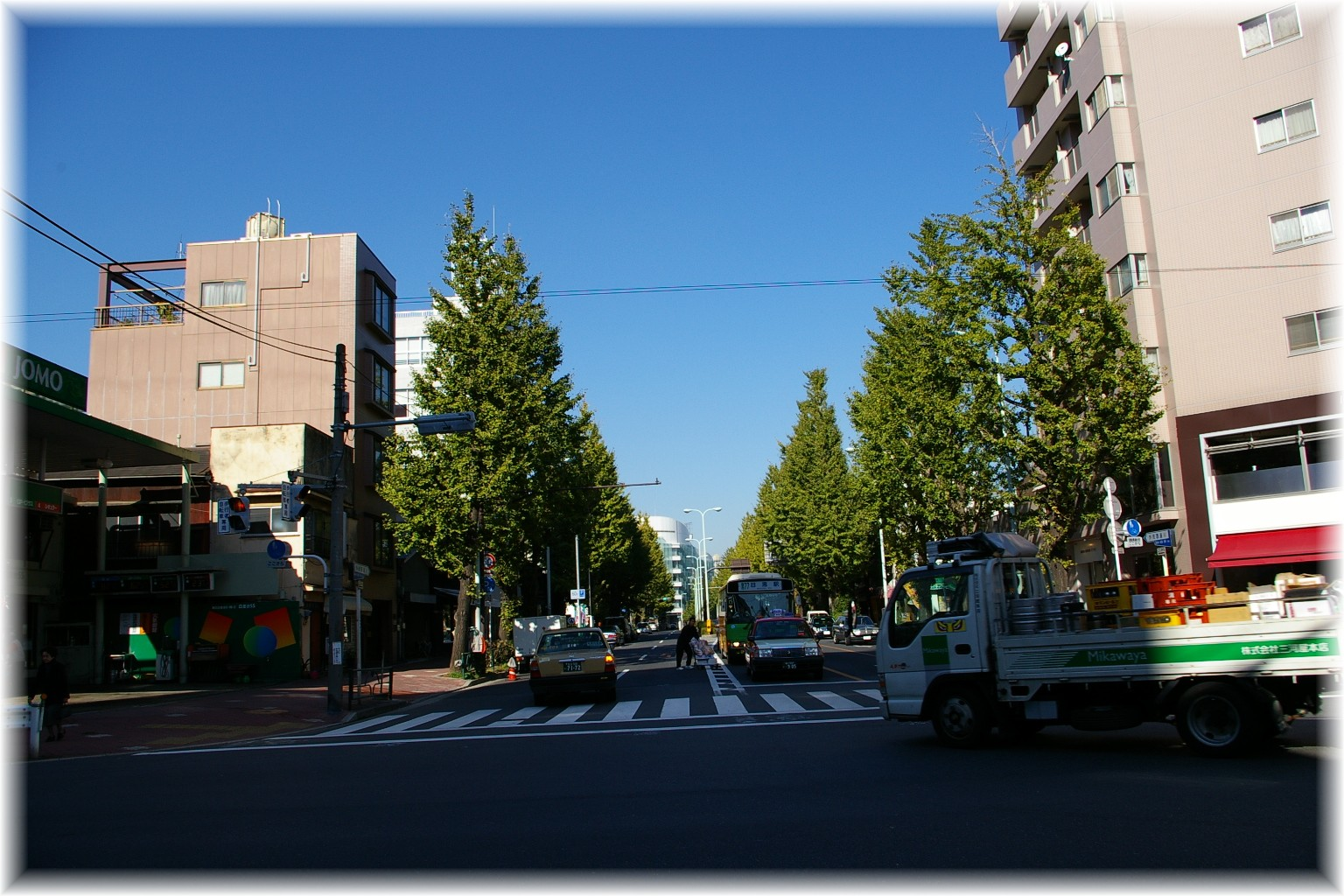
Gaien Nishi-dori, popularly known as Platinum Street

Shirokanedai (白金台) is a district of Minato, Tokyo. The district today is made up of 5 chome. As of November 1, 2007, the population of Shirokanedai is 10,001.

The former neighborhood of Shirokanedai (Shirokanedaimachi, 白金台町) consisted only of very narrow area along Meguro-dori (Tokyo Prefectural Route 312) and the former imperial estate called Shirokane Goryochi. It was merged with nearby neighborhoods after the promulgation of the current addressing system in 1969.

== Overview ==
Located at the southwestern end of Minato, the neighborhood of Shirokanedai lies between Ebisu, Kamiōsaki and Higashigotanda on the west, Takanawa on the east, and Shirokane on the north. Shopping amenities and apartment buildings are densely spread along Meguro-dori, Gaien Nishi-dori and Sakurada-dori; however, most in Shirokanedai are quiet residential areas. Shirokanedai remains abundant in natural green space, for historically Shirokanedai-cho was home to the former imperial estate called Shirokane Goryochi (now the Institute for Nature Study and the Tokyo Metropolitan Teien Art Museum are located) and several national institutions such as the former Institute of Public Health and the former Institute of Infectious Diseases (now the Institute of Medical Science, University of Tokyo). Later, Shirokanedai came to be considered one of the most upmarket residential areas in Tokyo, and women resident there — stereotypically wealthy, idle and fashion-conscious — are jocularly referred to as shiroganeeze (シロガネーゼ), an imitation of Milanese for residents of Milan. The most famous street in this area is Gaien Nishi-dori, popularly known as Platinum Street (プラチナ通り, Purachina-dori), a sort of local equivalent of the prestigious Via Montenapoleone in Milan. The restaurants in this street are very popular for wedding ceremonies.

== Places ==
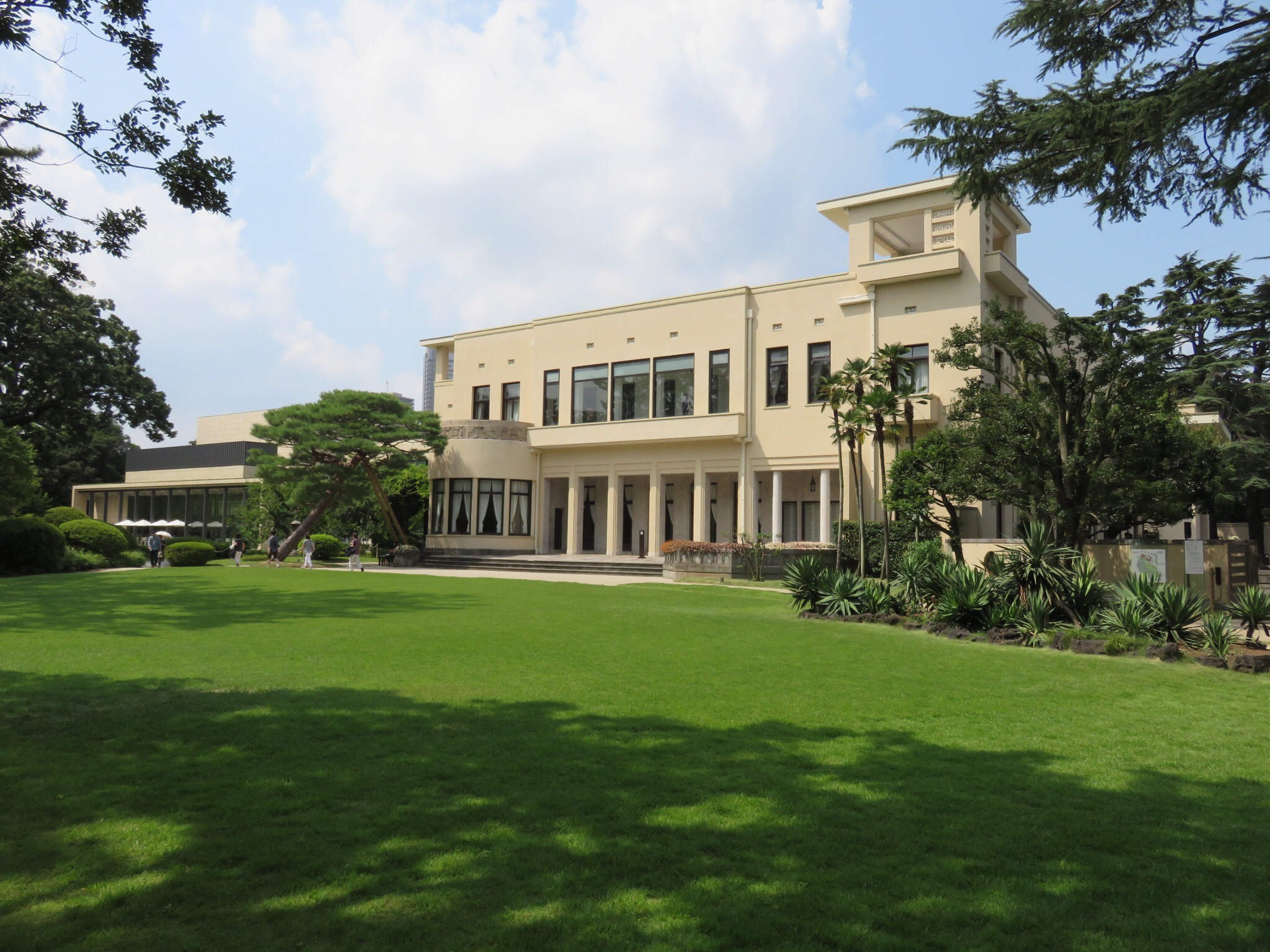
Tokyo Metropolitan Teien Art Museum

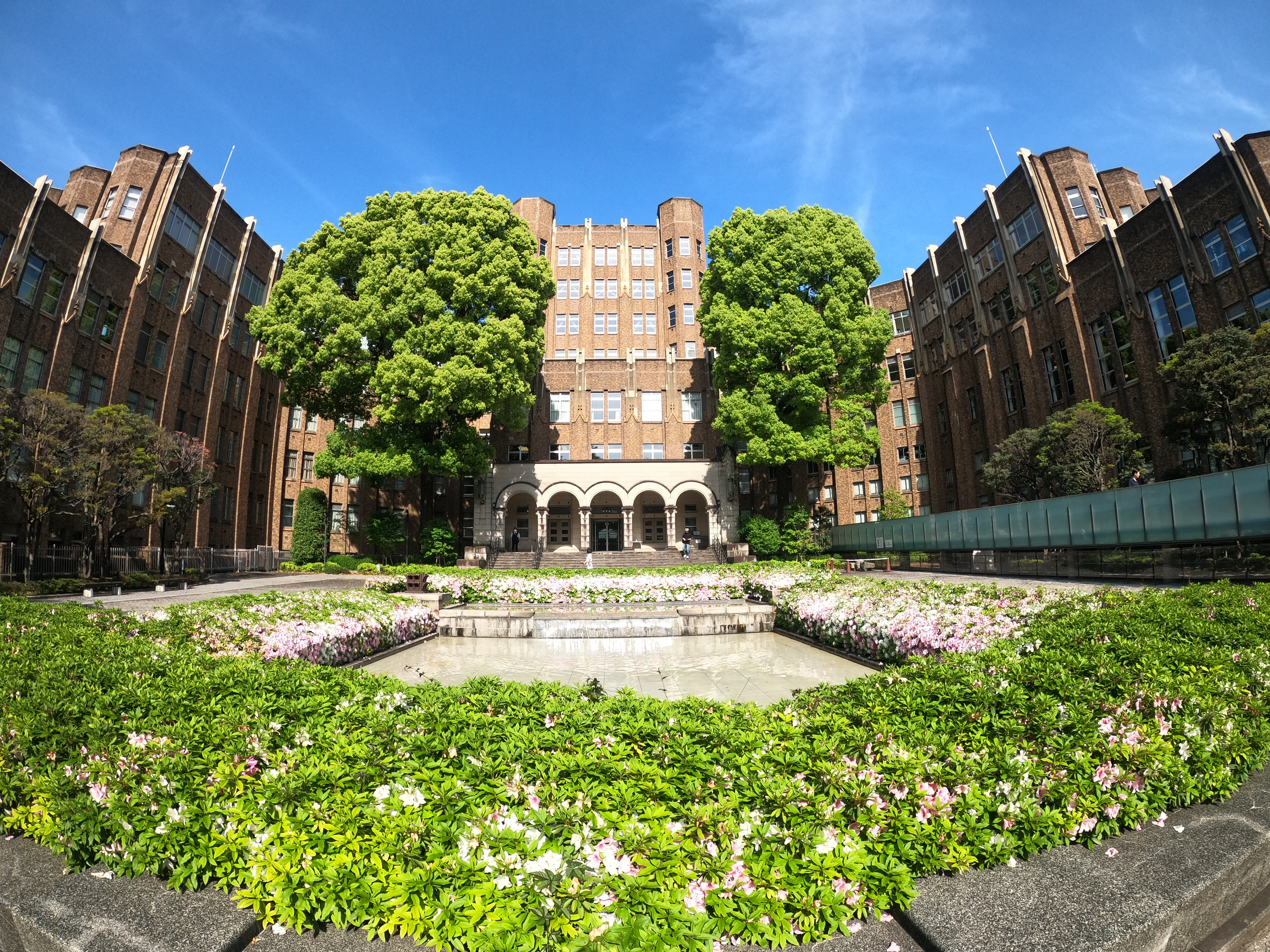
Minato City Local History Museum

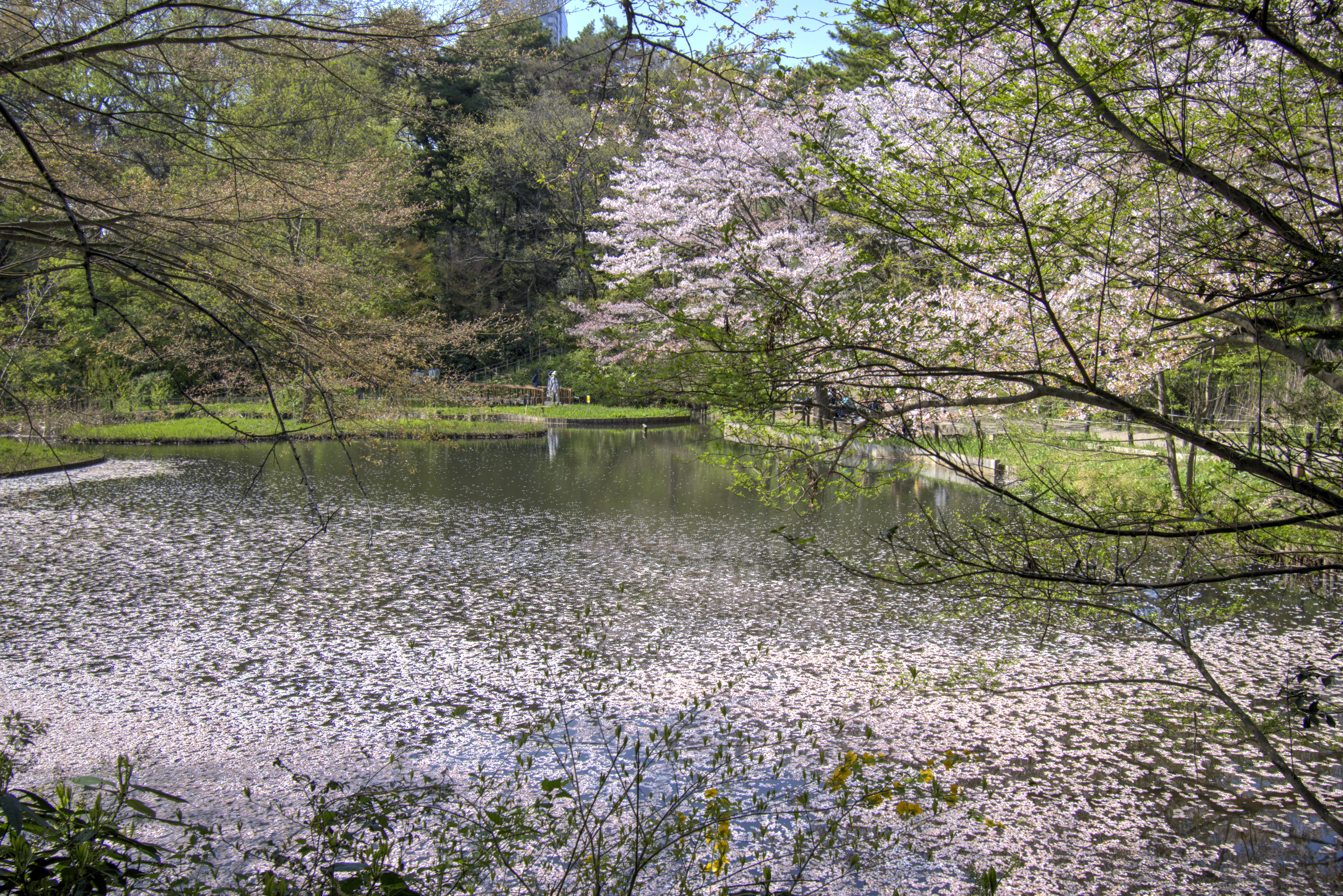
The Institute for Nature Study

=== Shirokanedai 1-chōme ===
- Meiji Gakuin University
- Meiji Gakuin Senior High School
- Kakurin-ji, a Buddhist temple known as Seishōkō
- Sheraton Miyako Hotel Tokyo
- HAPPO-EN, a wedding venue with restaurants and large Japanese gardens, former residence of Fusanosuke Kuhara

=== Shirokanedai 2-chōme ===
- Takanawadai Station
- Hatakeyama Memorial Museum of Fine Art
- Shoei Girls' Junior and Senior High School

=== Shirokanedai 3-chōme ===
- Myōen-ji
- Zuishō-ji

=== Shirokanedai 4-chōme ===
- Shirokanedai Station
- Embassy of the State of Eritrea in Japan
- Minato City Local History Museum, built in 1938 as National Institute of Public Health
- The Institute of Medical Science, The University of Tokyo

=== Shirokanedai 5-chōme ===
- (Taiwan) Taipei Economic and Cultural Representative Office in Japan
- Embassy of the Republic of Zimbabwe in Japan
- The Institute for Nature Study, National Museum of Nature and Science, a nature preserve park
- Tokyo Metropolitan Teien Art Museum, former residence of Prince Asaka Yasuhiko
- Matsuoka Museum of Art

== Education ==
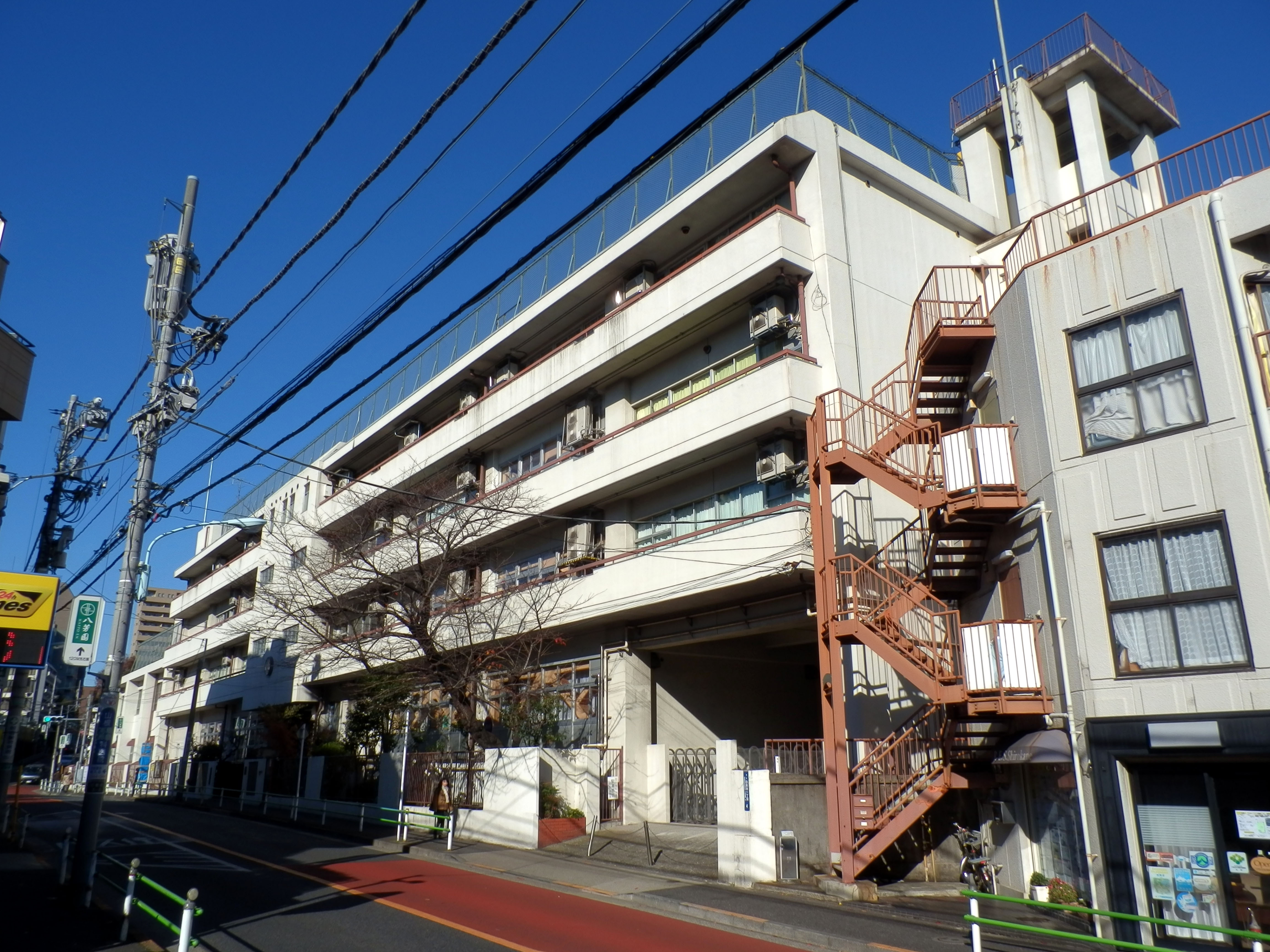
Shirokane Elementary School (白金小学校)

Minato City Board of Education operates public elementary and junior high schools.

Shirokanedai 1-3 chōme, 4-chōme 1-5 and 7-19-ban, and 5-chōme 13-25-ban are zoned to Shirokane Elementary School (白金小学校) and Takamatsu Junior High School (高松中学校). Shirokanedai 4-chōme 6-20-ban and 5-chōme 1-12-ban are zoned to Shirogane-no-oka Gakuen (白金の丘学園) for elementary and junior high school.

The Shoei Girls' Junior and Senior High School, a private girls' school, is in Shirokanedai.
