= Tokyo Metropolitan Teien Art Museum =

- 東京都庭園美術館
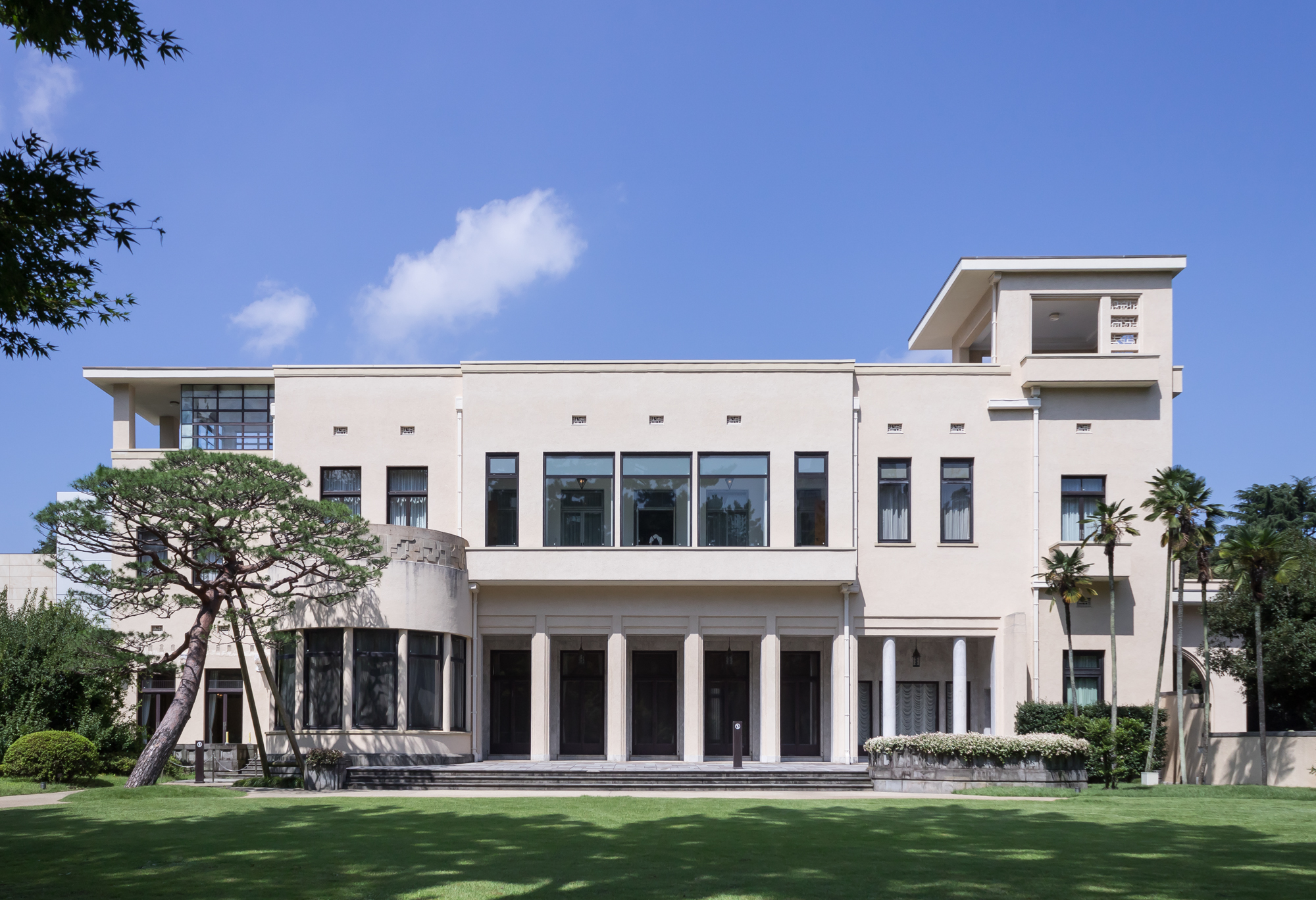
- Teien Art Museum

- Location of The Tokyo Metropolitan Teien Art Museum in Japan Tokyo Metropolitan Teien Art Museum (Tokyo wards area)
- Location: 5-21-9 Shirokanedai, Minato-ku, Tokyo, Japan
- Coordinates: 3166-2 35.636889°N 139.719083°E
- Type: Art museum
- Owners: Tokyo Metropolitan Foundation for History and Culture
- Website: http://www.teien-art-museum.ne.jp/en/

The Tokyo Metropolitan Teien Art Museum (東京都庭園美術館, Tōkyō-to Teien Bijutsukan) is an art museum in Shirokanedai in Tokyo, Japan.

The museum is located in Minato ward, just east of Meguro Station. The Art Deco building, completed in 1933, has interiors designed by Henri Rapin and features decorative glass work by René Lalique.

== History ==
The Tokyo Metropolitan Teien Art Museum building was the residence of Prince Asaka Yasuhiko and his family from 1933 to 1947. The prince, who studied at the École Spéciale Militaire de Saint-Cyr in France, and travelled to the United States in 1925, was enamoured of the Art Deco movement. On his return to Japan he commissioned the construction of his own private residence in this style. Although many of the interiors were designed according to plans submitted by Henri Rapin, the main architect of the building itself is credited as Gondo Yukichi of the Works Bureau of the Imperial Household Ministry.

After World War II the building served as the official residence of the Prime Minister (1947–50), and as a State Guest House (1950–74). The residence was first opened to the public as a museum in 1983. It is one of Japan's many museums which are supported by a prefectural government. Teien means Japanese garden, and the museum is so named because the building is surrounded by a garden and sculptures.

== Current facilities ==
After undergoing extensive renovation in 2013, the museum was re-opened in November 2014. The new museum annex, designed in collaboration with Hiroshi Sugimoto includes modern exhibition spaces, a café and museum shop.

== Gallery ==
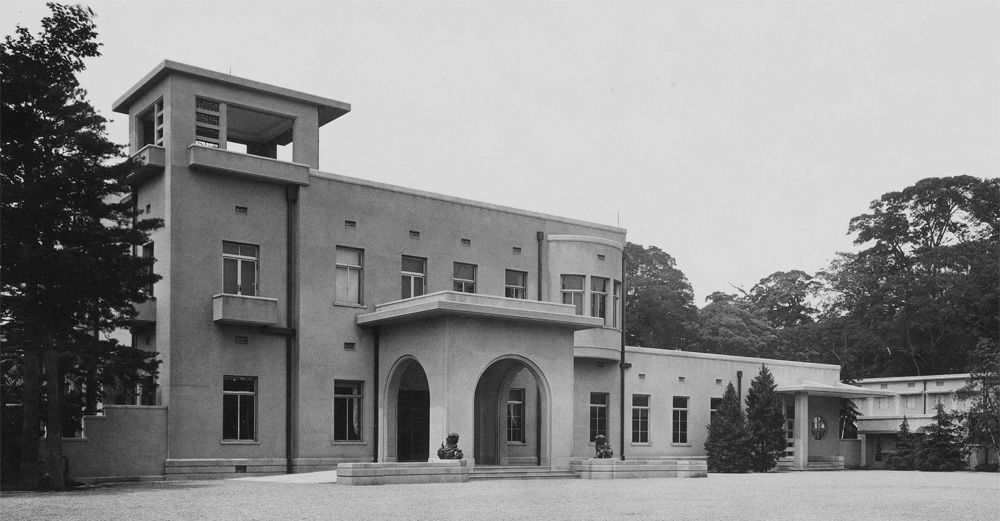
Prince Asaka Residence

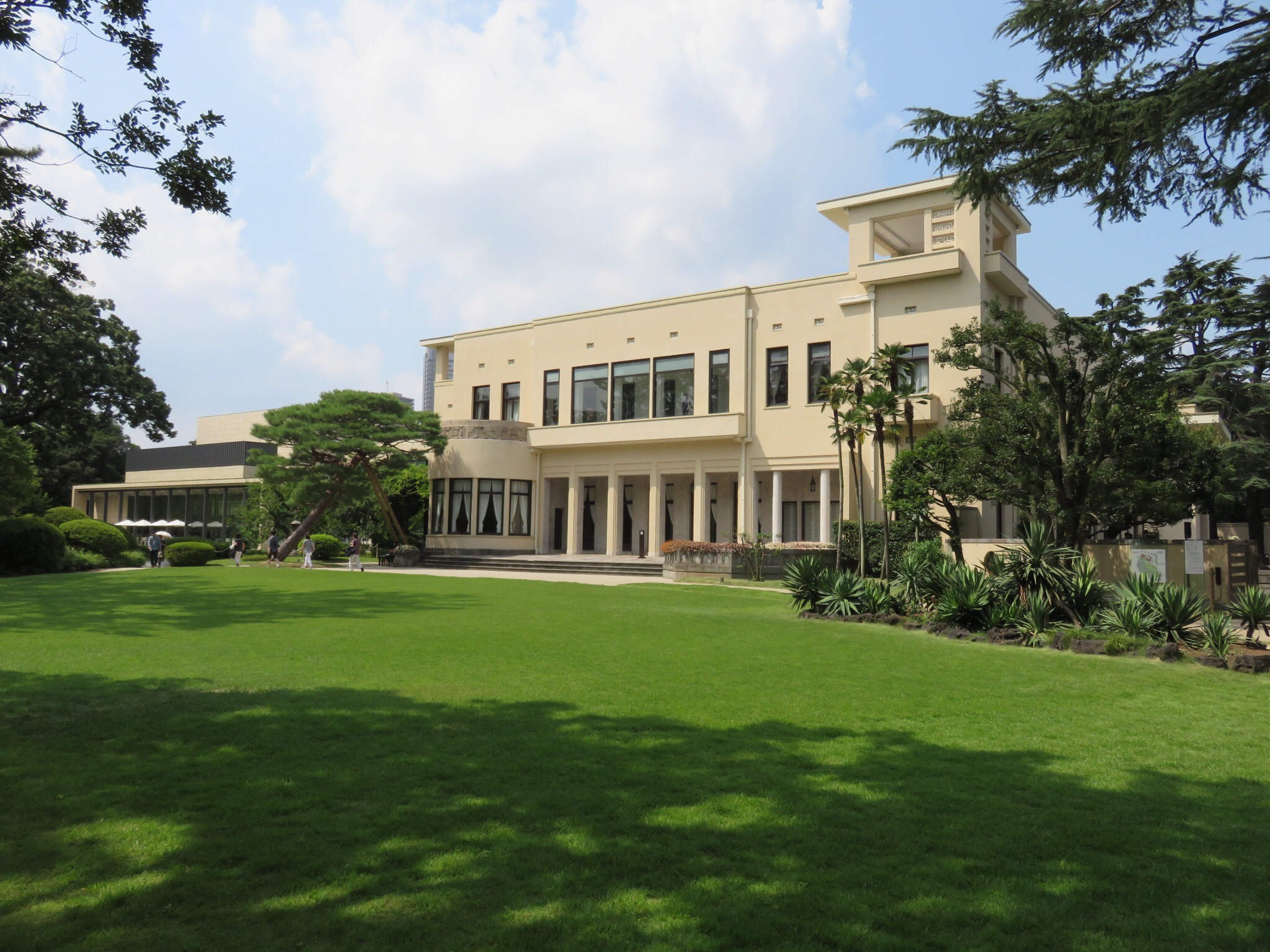
Teien Museum from Garden

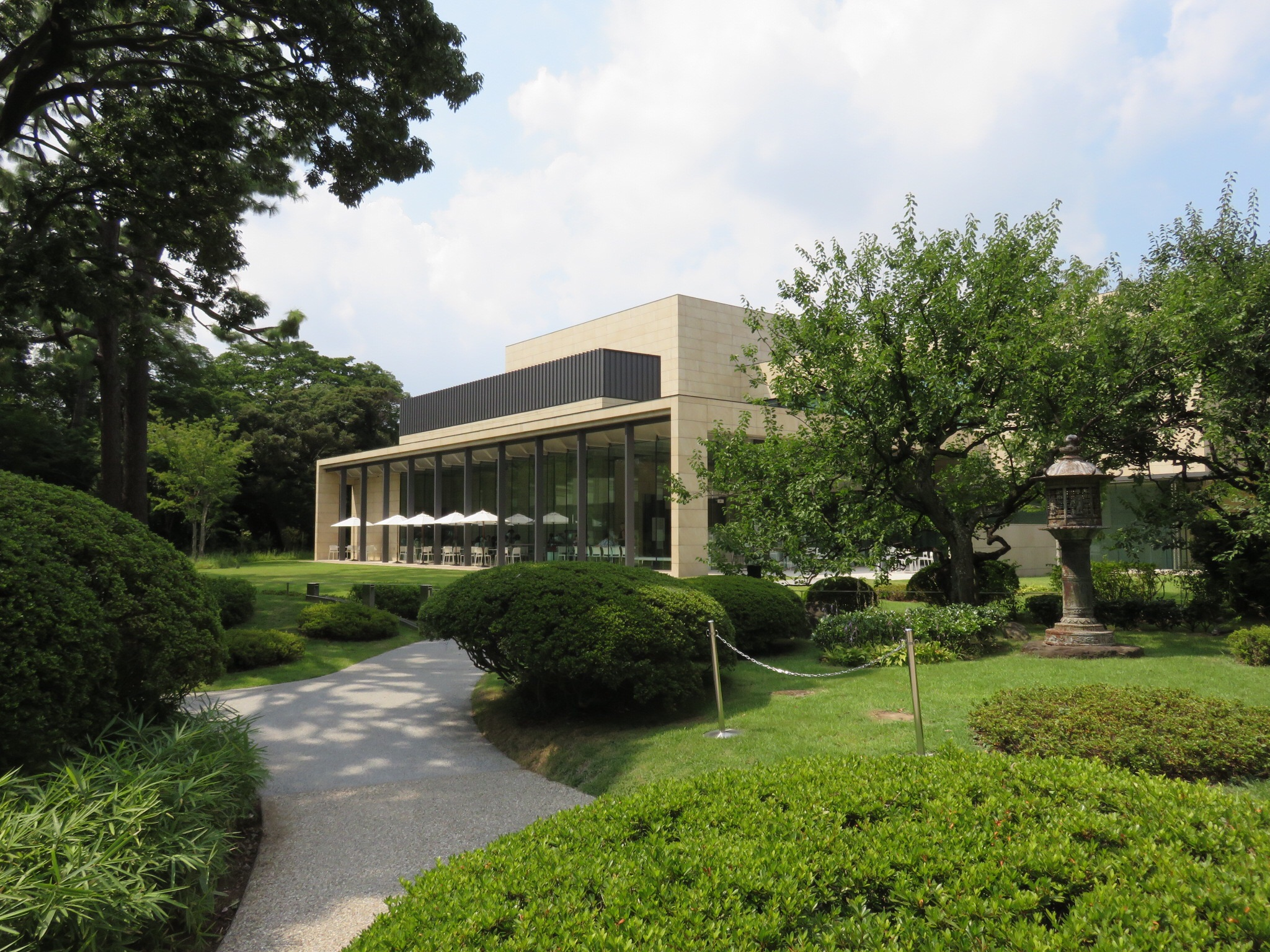
Teien Museum Annex (completed 2014)

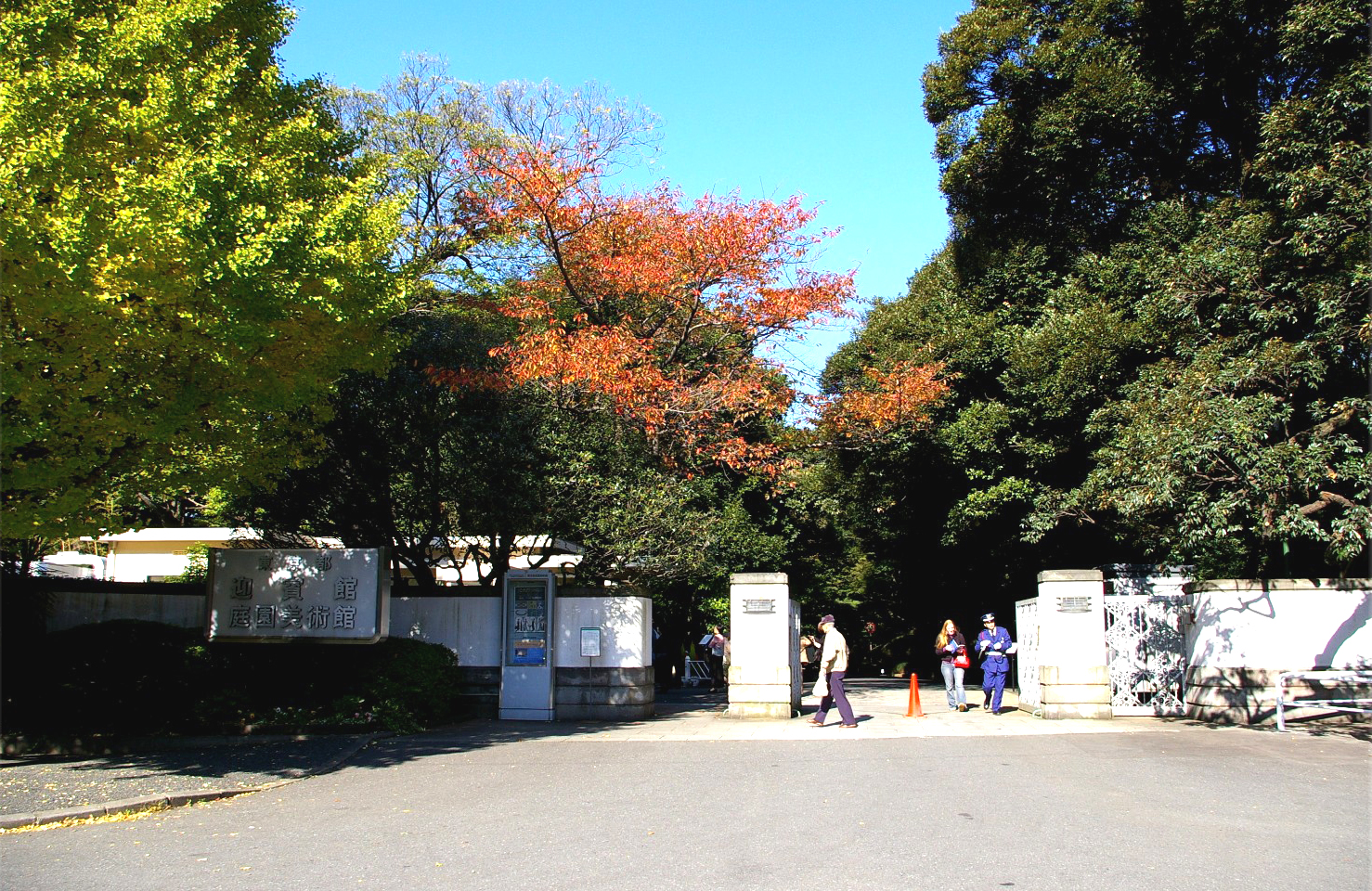
Museum Entrance

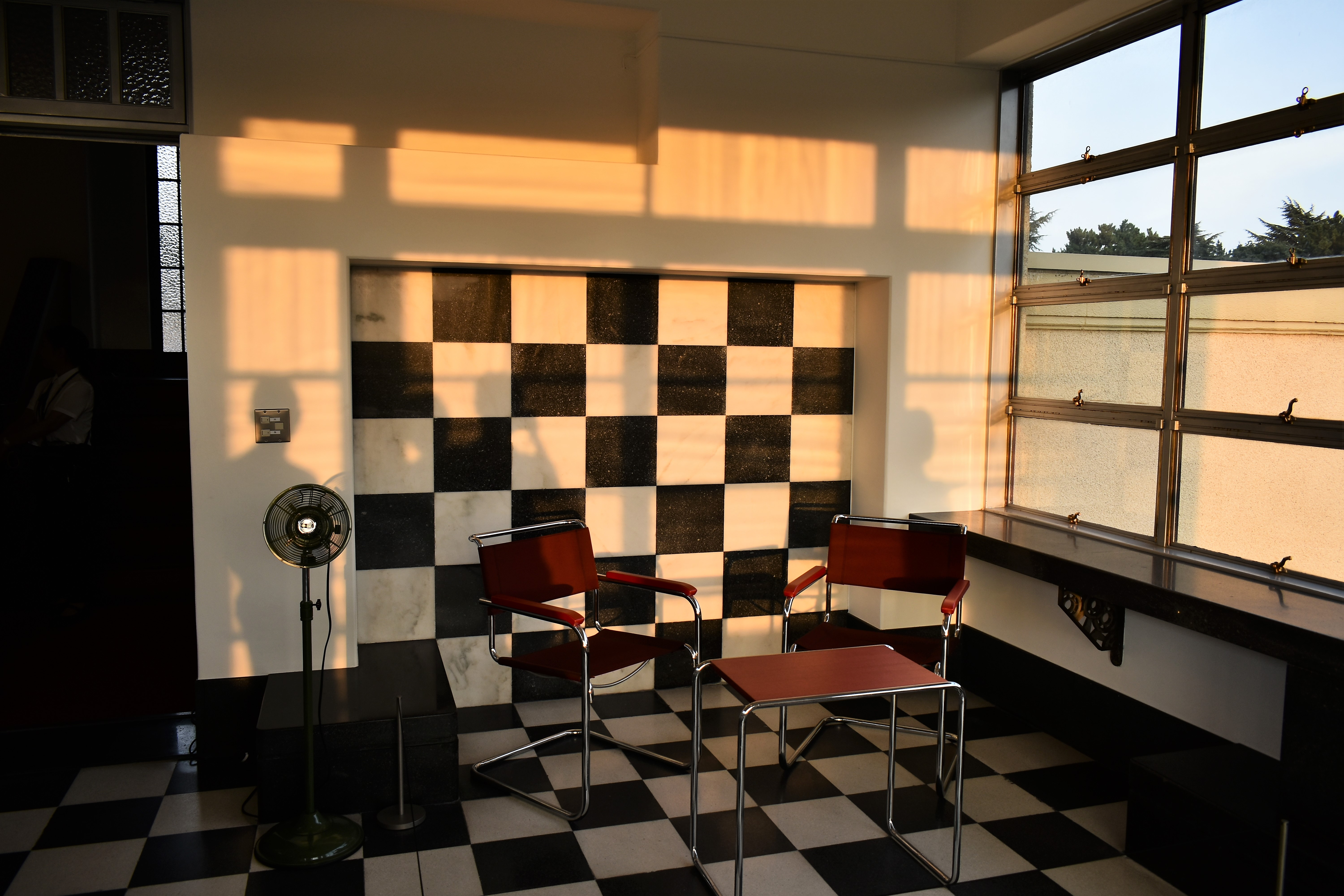
Winter garden on the rooftop

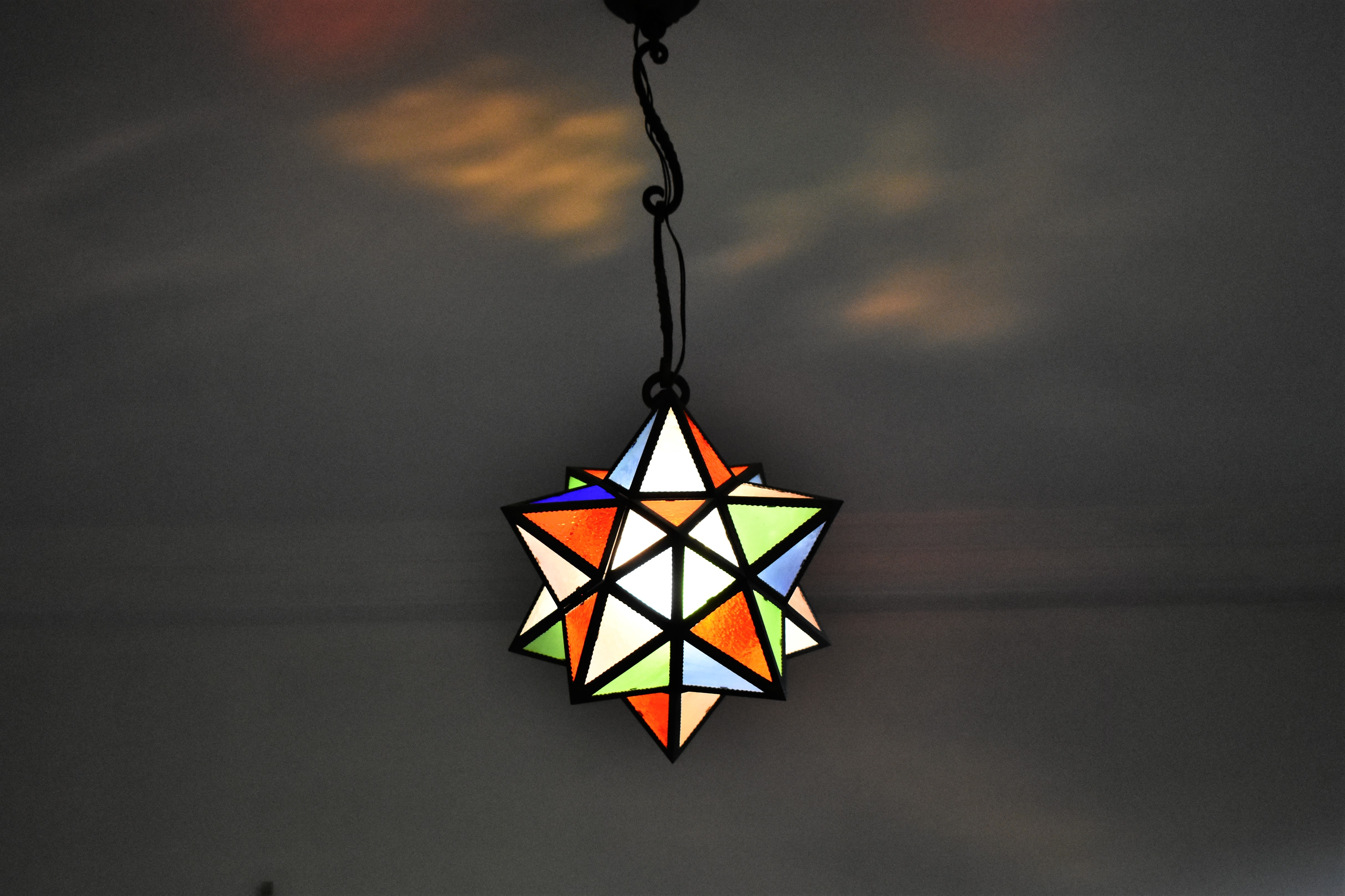
The illumination made of stained glass

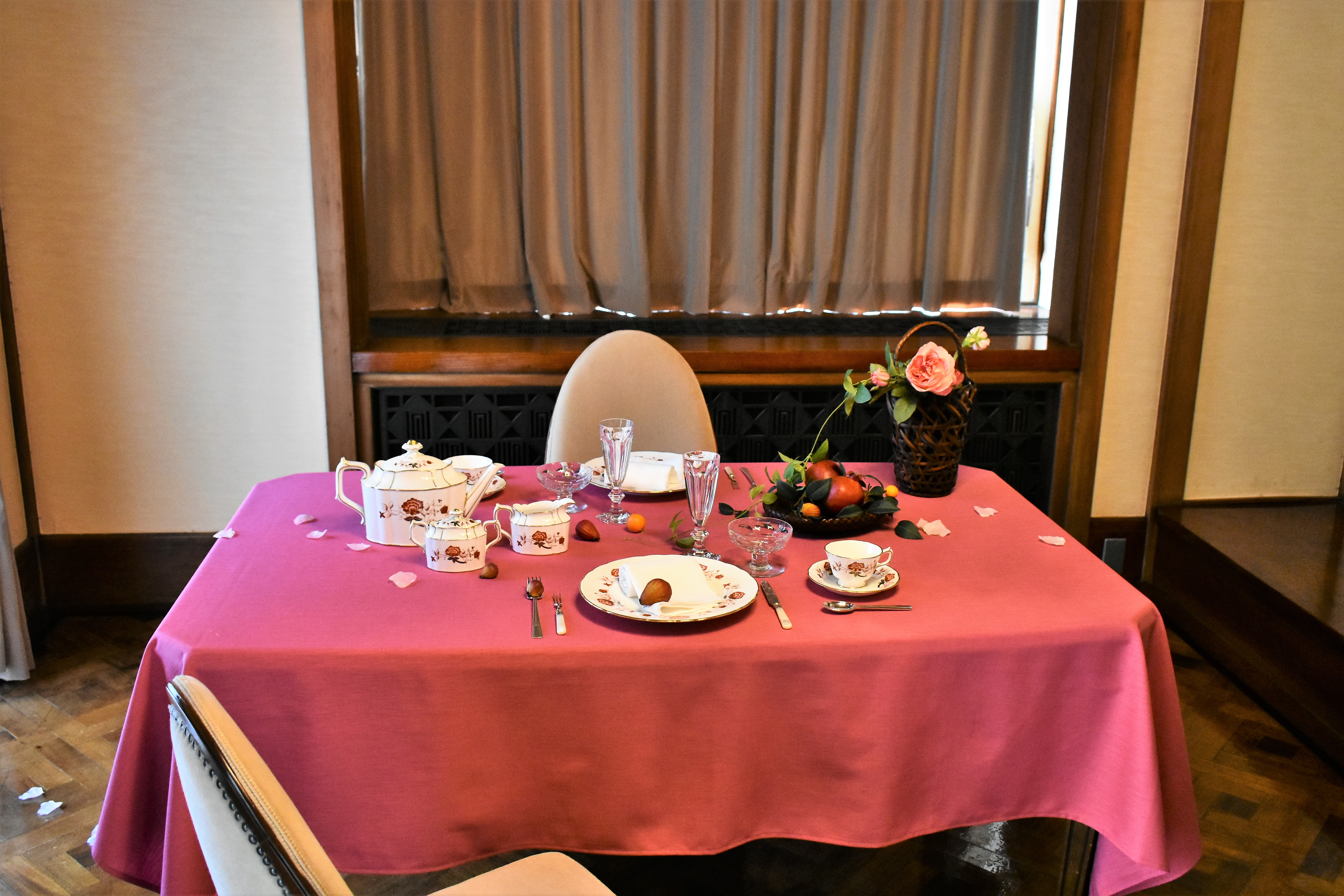
This room was used for the Asakanomiya family's daily meals.

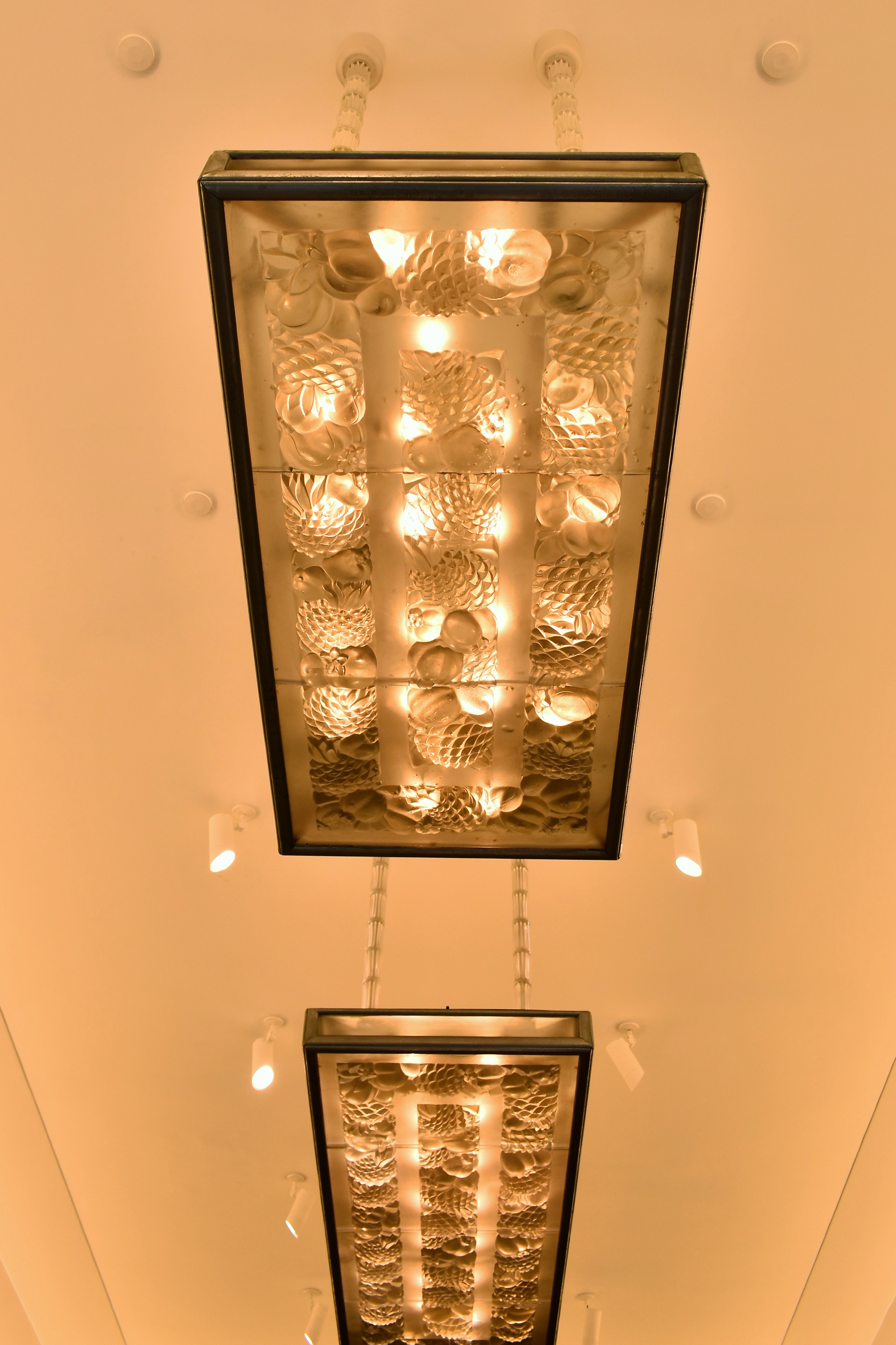
A lighting fixture of René Lalique in the great dining room

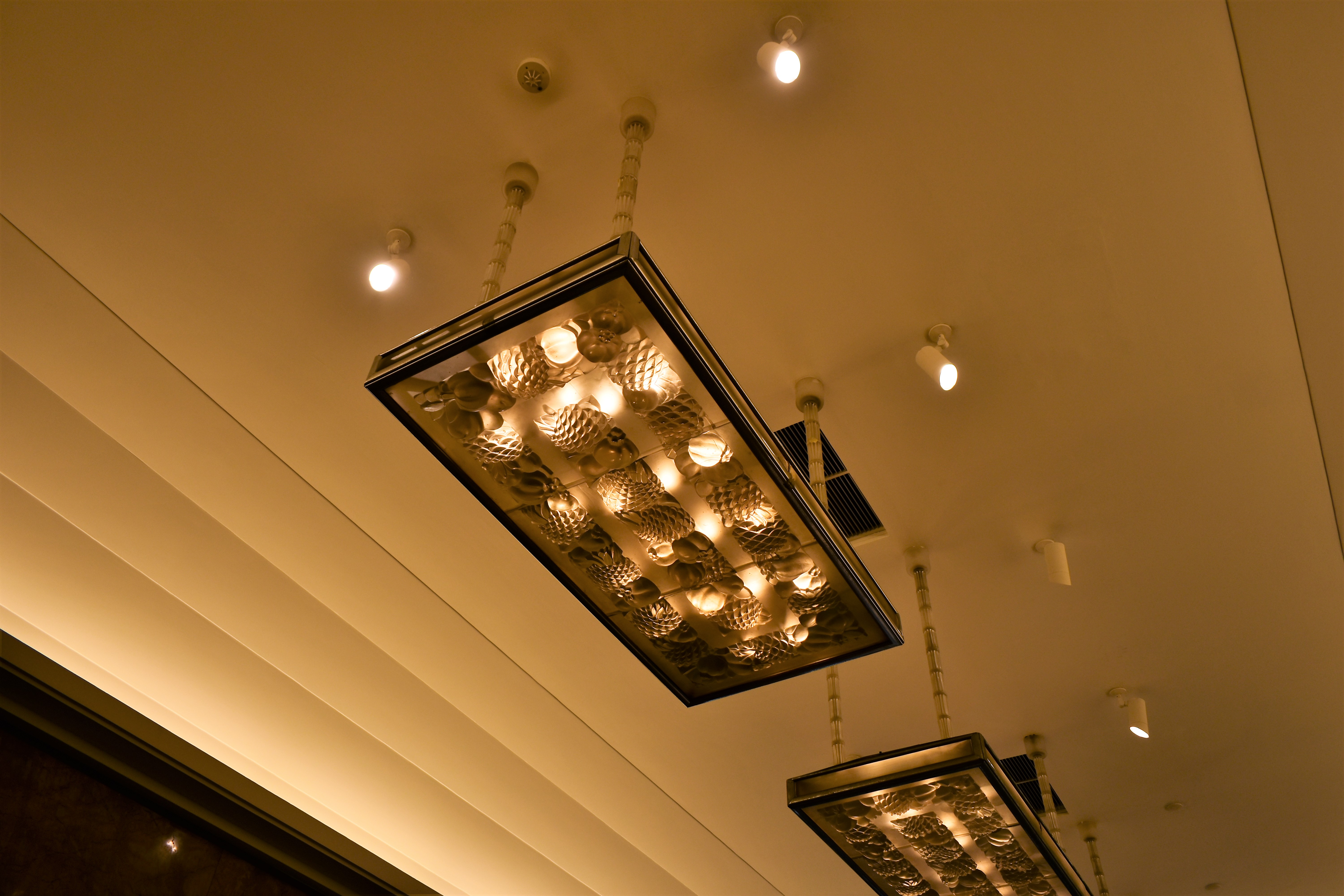
A lighting fixture of René Lalique in the great dining room

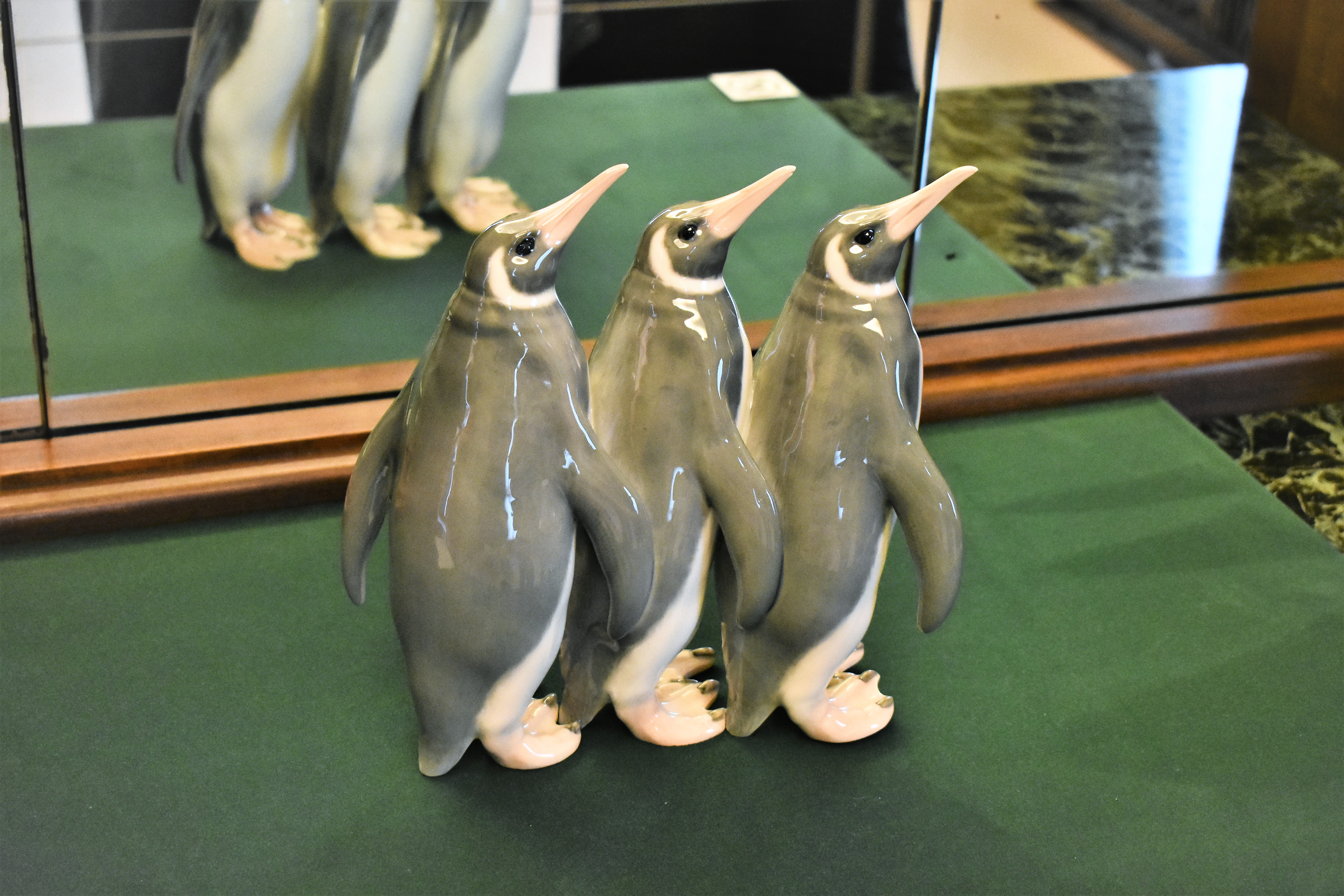
Ornament of pottery in around 1920 of Danish Royal Copenhagen which was modeled on the penguin put in the room

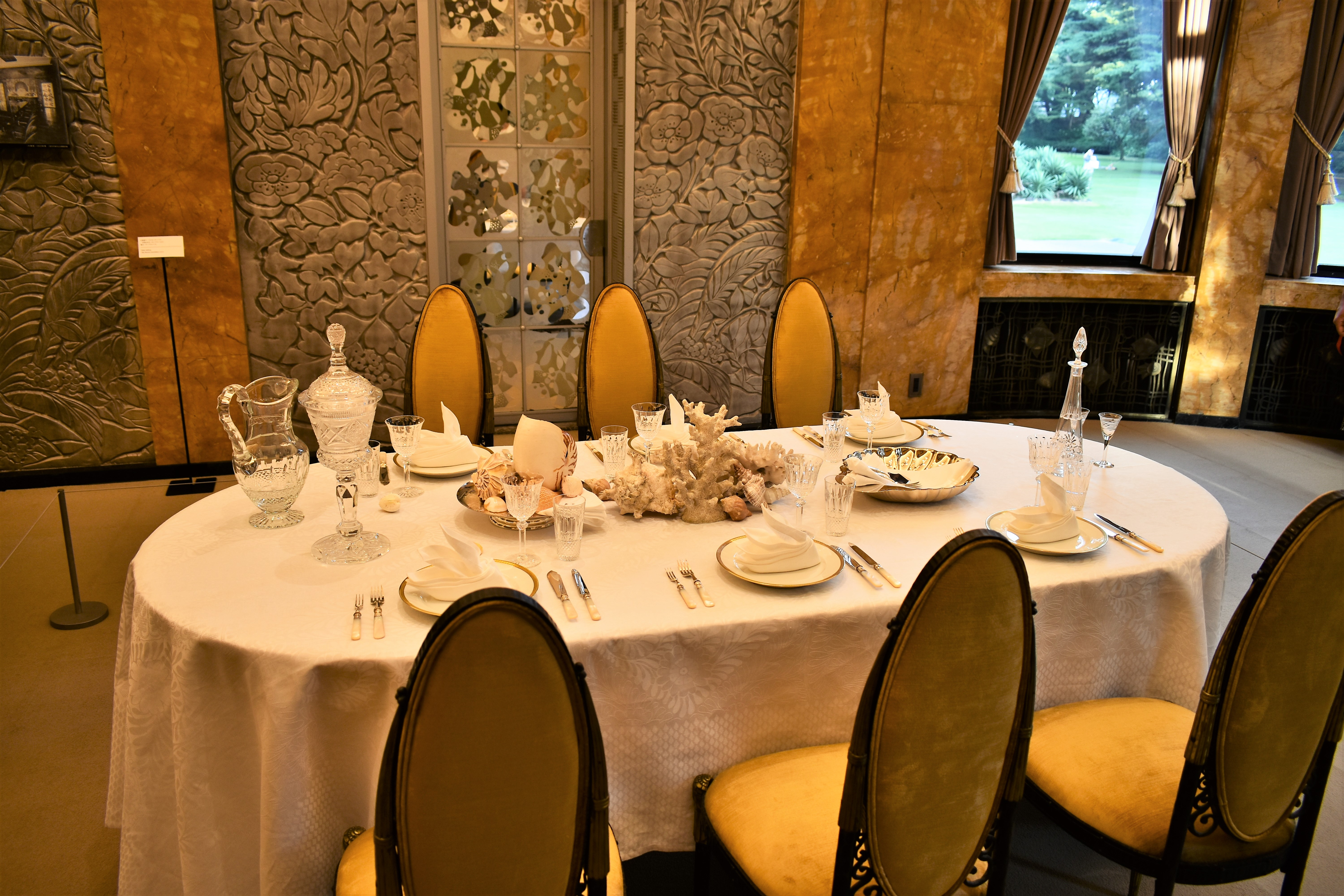
A great dining room

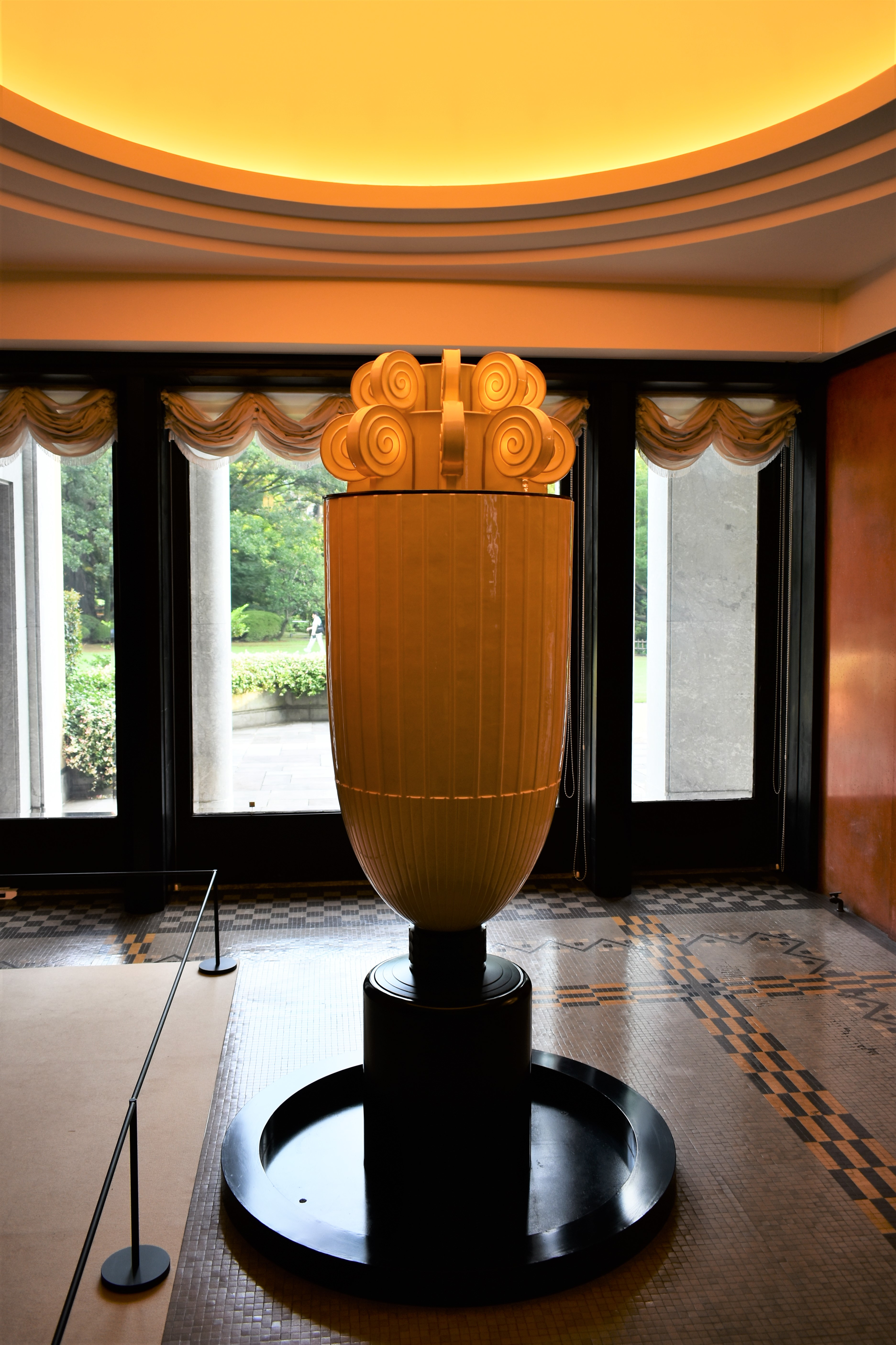
A white porcelain "perfume tower" in the room called "Tsugi-no-ma"

== See also ==
- Prefectural museum
