= Institute for Nature Study =

Nature preserve park in Tokyo, Japan

The Institute for Nature Study, National Museum of Nature and Science
- 国立科学博物館附属自然教育園
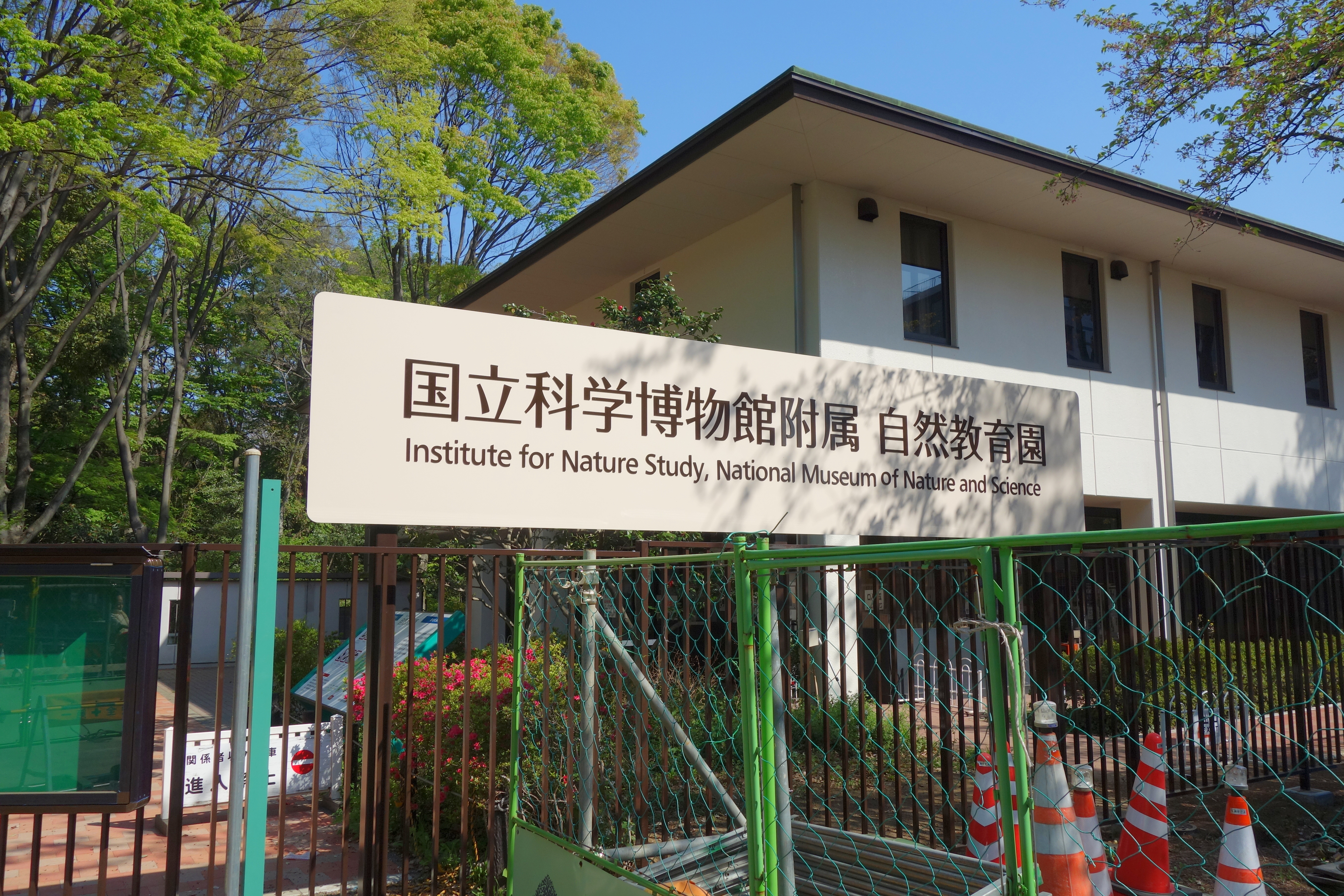
- Entrance of the institute

- Location within Tokyo Location within Japan
- Type: Urban park
- Location: Shirokanedai, Minato, Tokyo, Japan
- Coordinates: 35°38′17″N 139°43′10″E
- Area: 5,662 square metres (1.399 acres)
- Created: 1949
- Natural Monument National Historic Site

The Institute for Nature Study (国立科学博物館附属自然教育園, Kokuritsu Kagaku Hakubutsukan fuzoku Shizen Kyōiku-en) is a Japanese nature preserve park associated with the National Museum of Nature and Science, located in the Shirokanedai neighborhood of Minato, Tokyo, extending into the Kamiōsaki neighborhood of Shinagawa, Tokyo. It is a Natural Monument and a National Historic Site of Japan.

== Overview ==
The park is home to more than 200 species of plants that represent part of the former Musashino region, animals such as Japanese raccoon dogs, mandarin ducks, as well as many types of insects. It is located about a 10-minute walk from Meguro Station on the JR East Yamanote Line.

== History ==
The area now occupied by The Institute for Nature Study has been occupied since prehistoric times, and mid-Jōmon period shell middens and Jōmon pottery from about 2500 years ago have been found in the area. During the Heian period, the area was farmland, with rice paddies, and in the Muromachi period the area contained a number of fortified manor houses. The place name of "Shirokanedai" has been found in written records from 1559 AD. After the foundation of the Edo Period Tokugawa shogunate, the area was initially part of the holdings of Zōjō-ji, an important Buddhist temple. However, in 1664, it became part of the estate of Matsudaira Yorishige, the daimyō of Takamatsu Domain. Some of the oldest pine trees in the Institute are thought to have been trees which were part of the Japanese garden in the villa on this estate. Following the Meiji restoration, the site was taken over by the Navy Ministry and Army Ministry for use as a gunpowder magazine. It became property of the Imperial Household Agency in 1917, and was renamed the "Shirokane Imperial Estate". However, little was done with the land, and during World War II, a number of fields were planted and air raid shelters were dug in its grounds. Following the surrender of Japan, the estate was transferred to the Ministry of Education in 1949, and was opened to the public as a national natural-education park. It has been designated The Institute for Nature Study as part of the National Museum of Nature and Science in 1962.

== Gallery ==
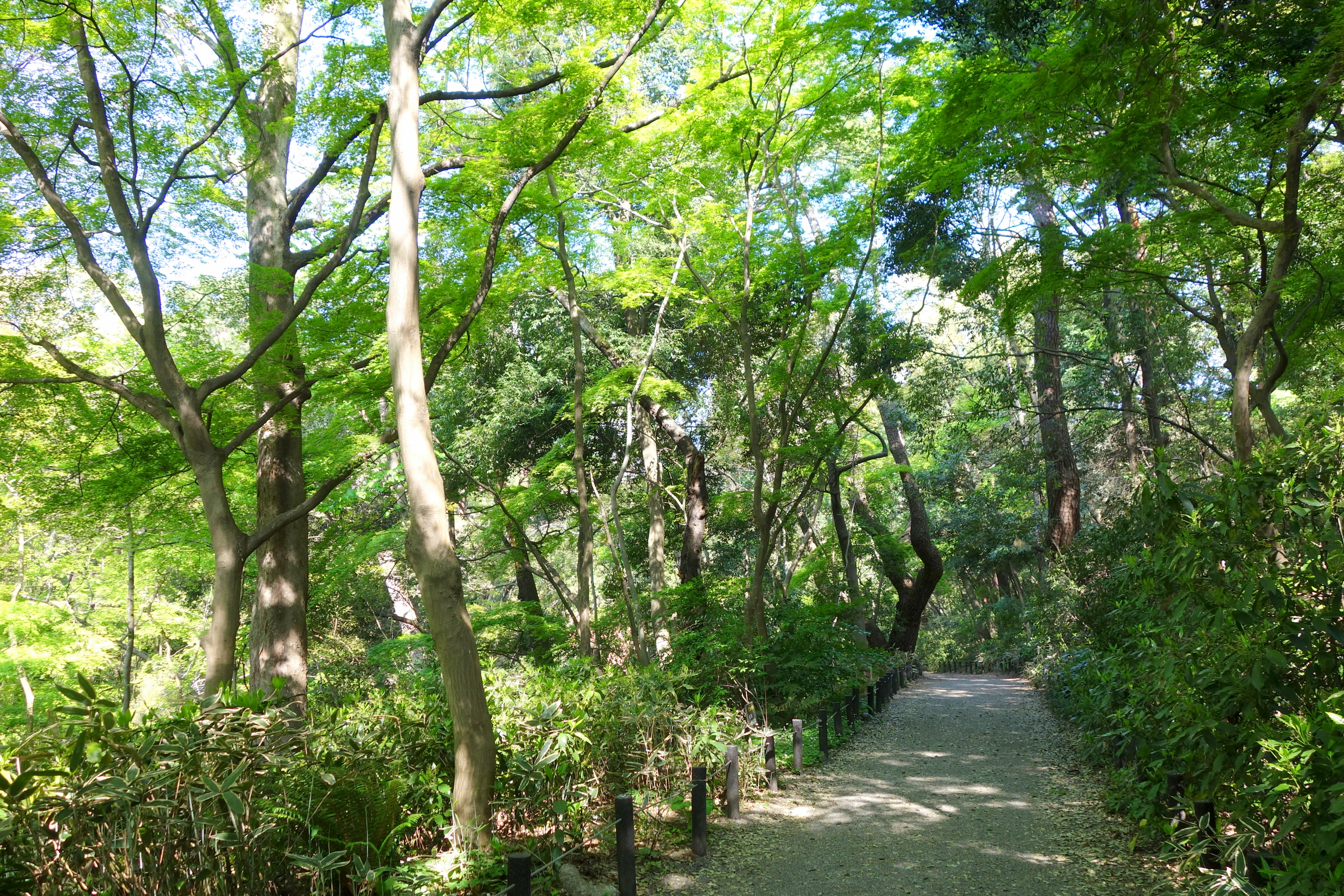
Walkway

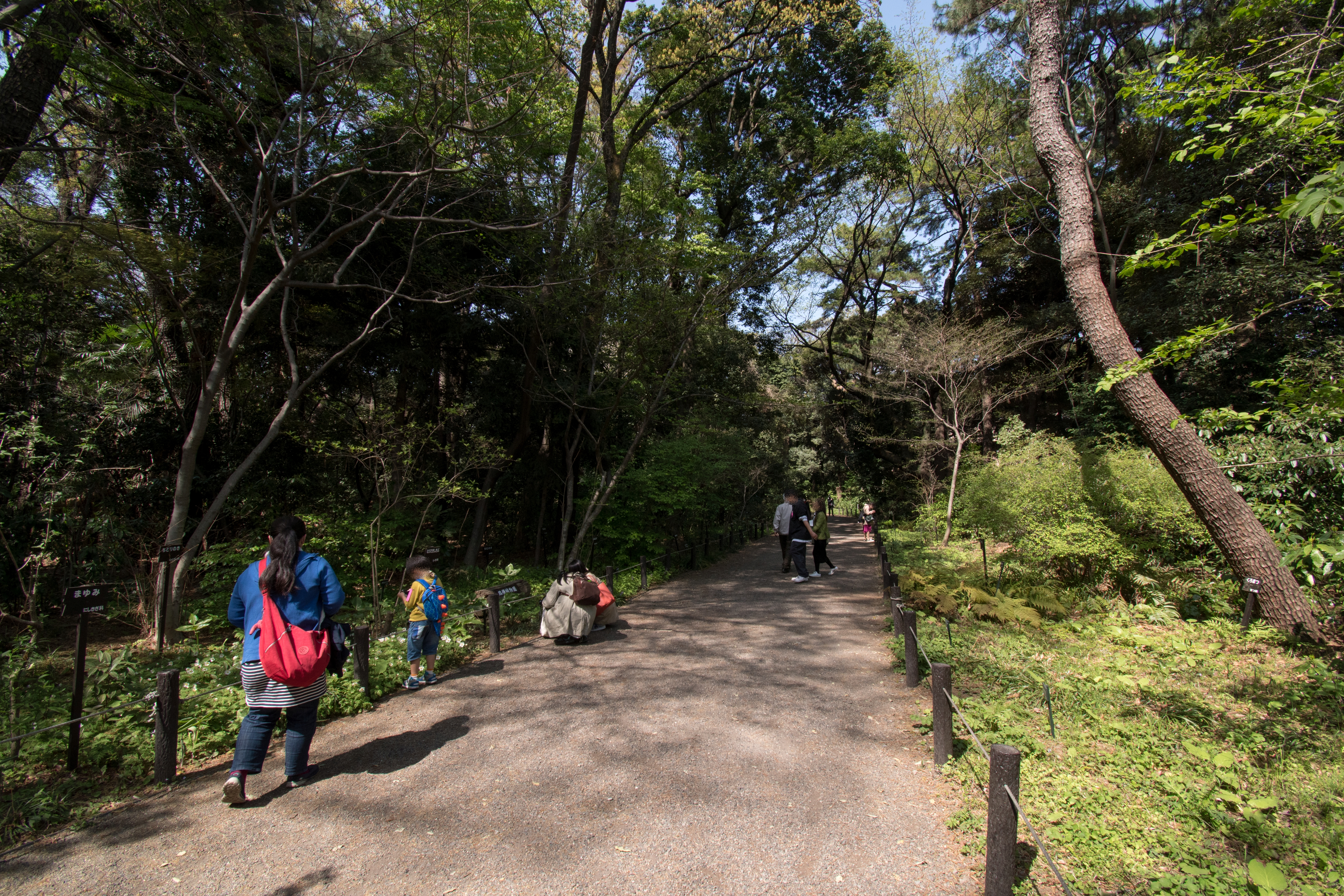
Promenade

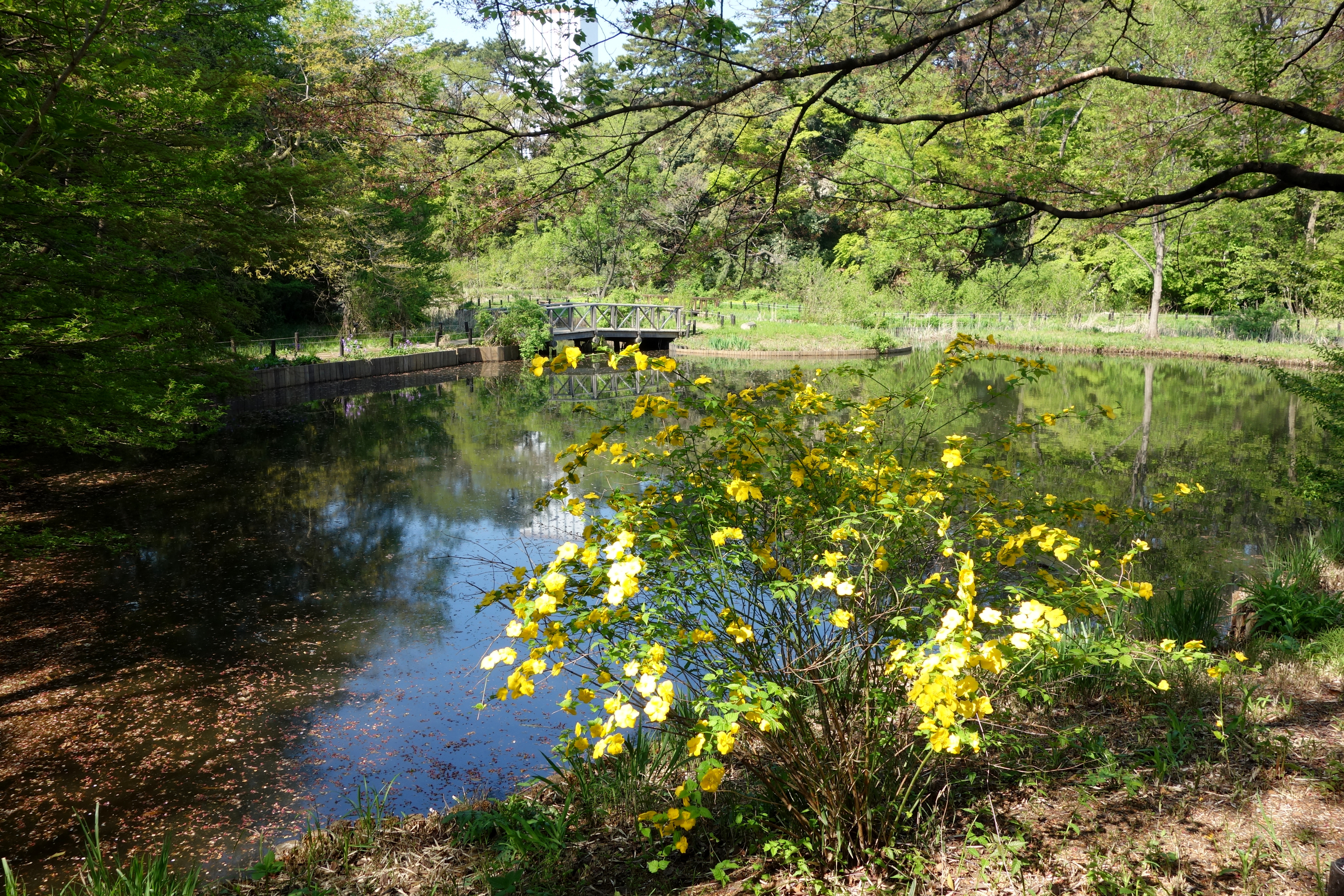
Pond

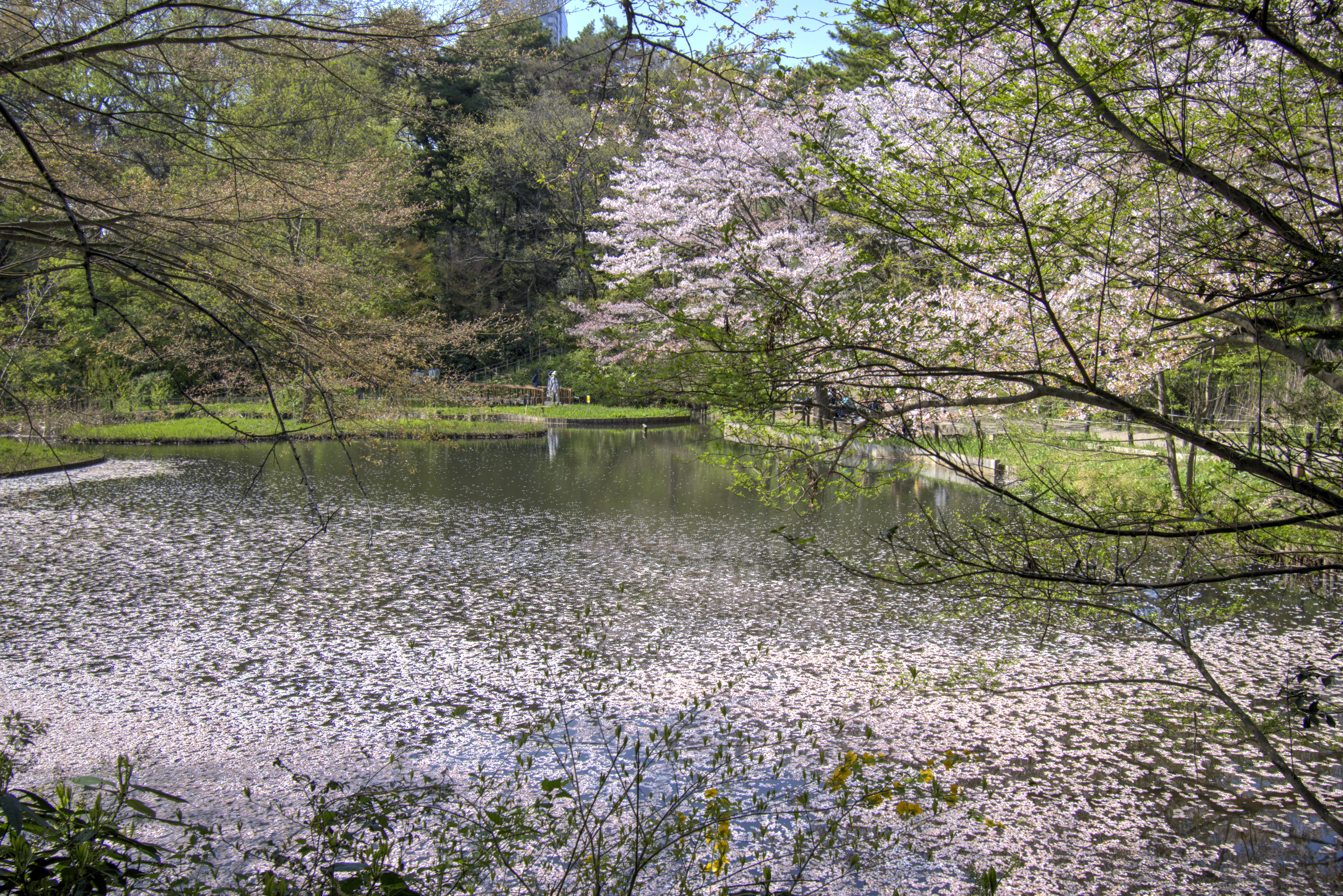
Pond

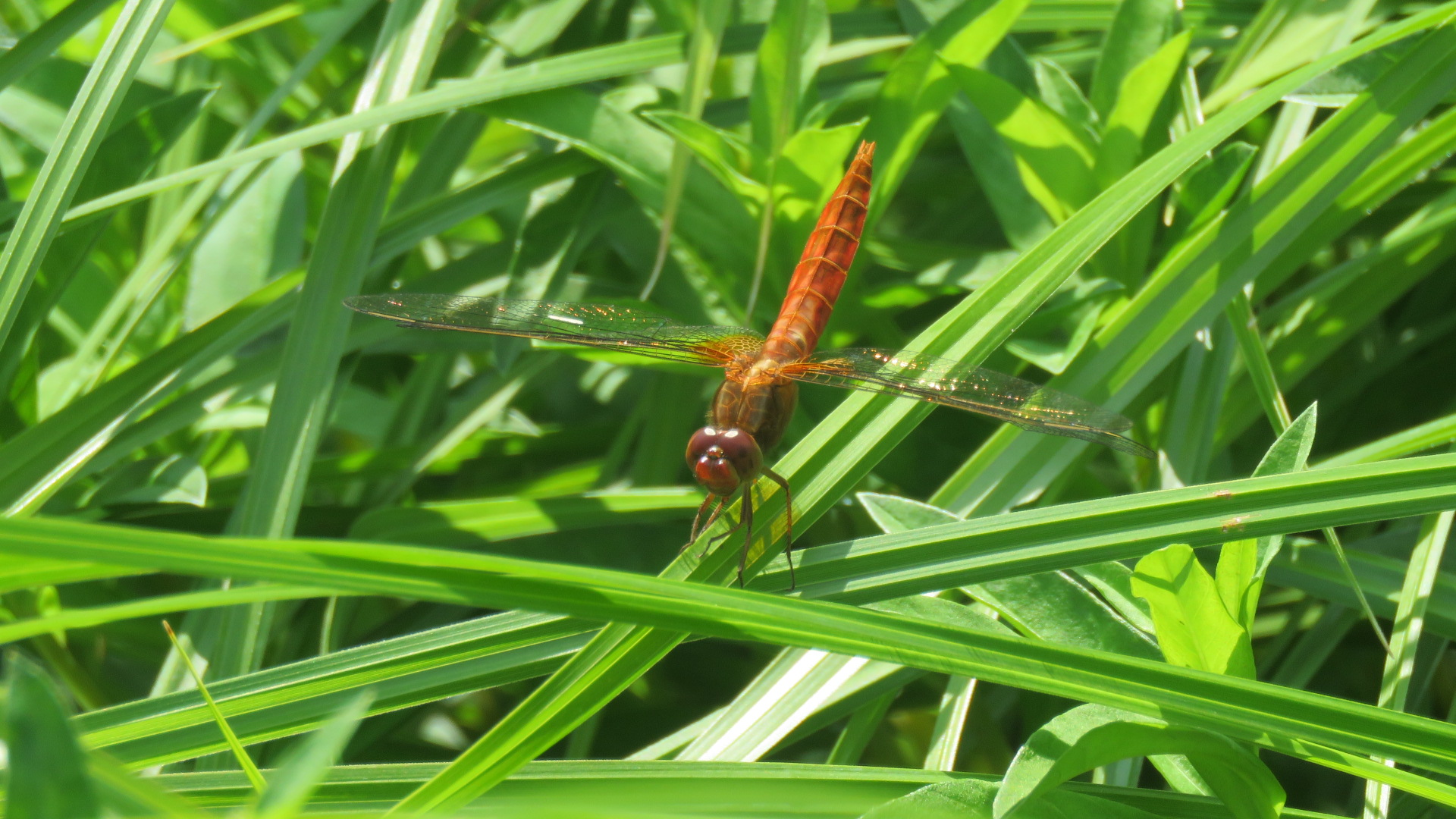
Scarlet skimmer

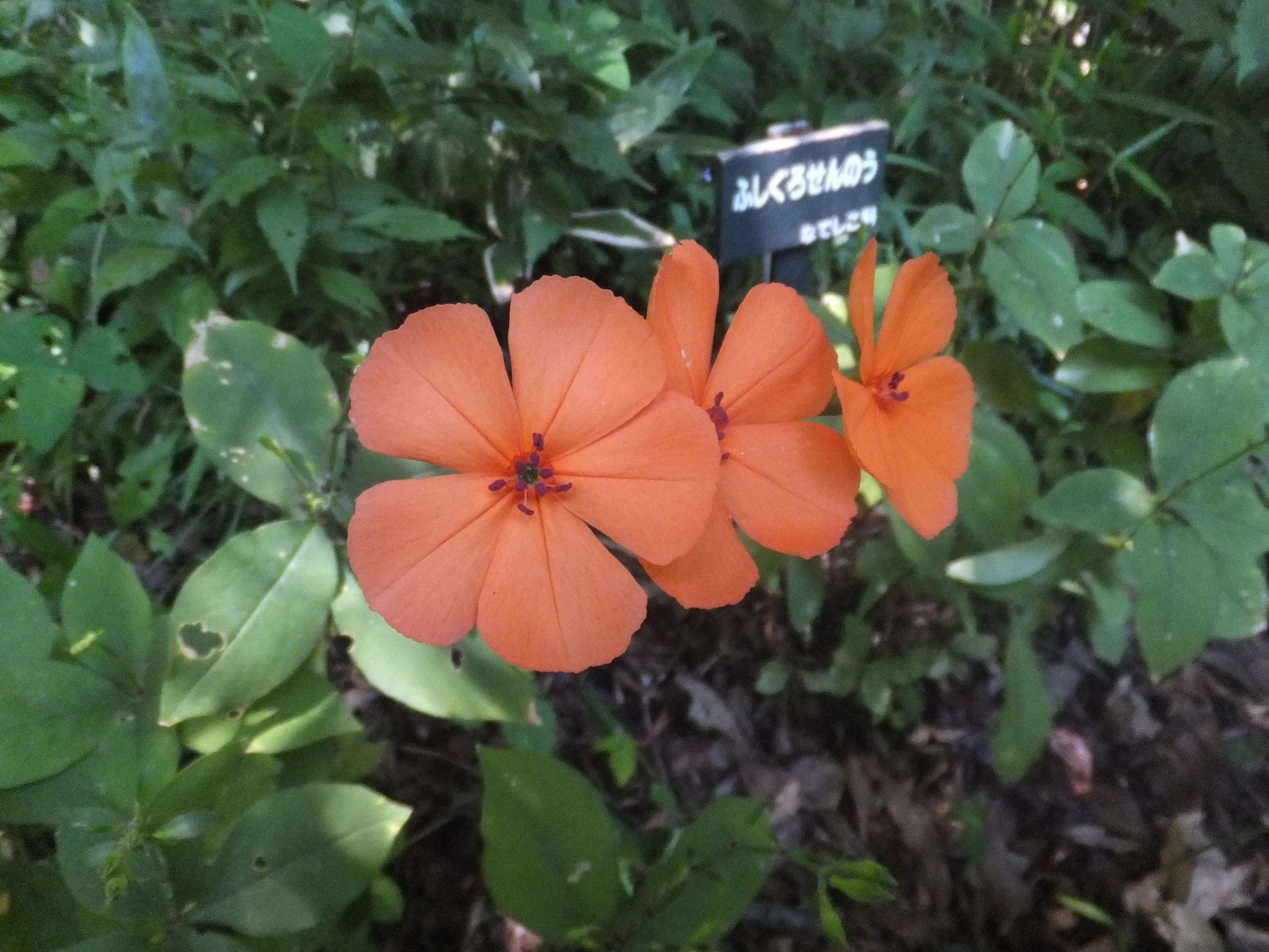
Silene

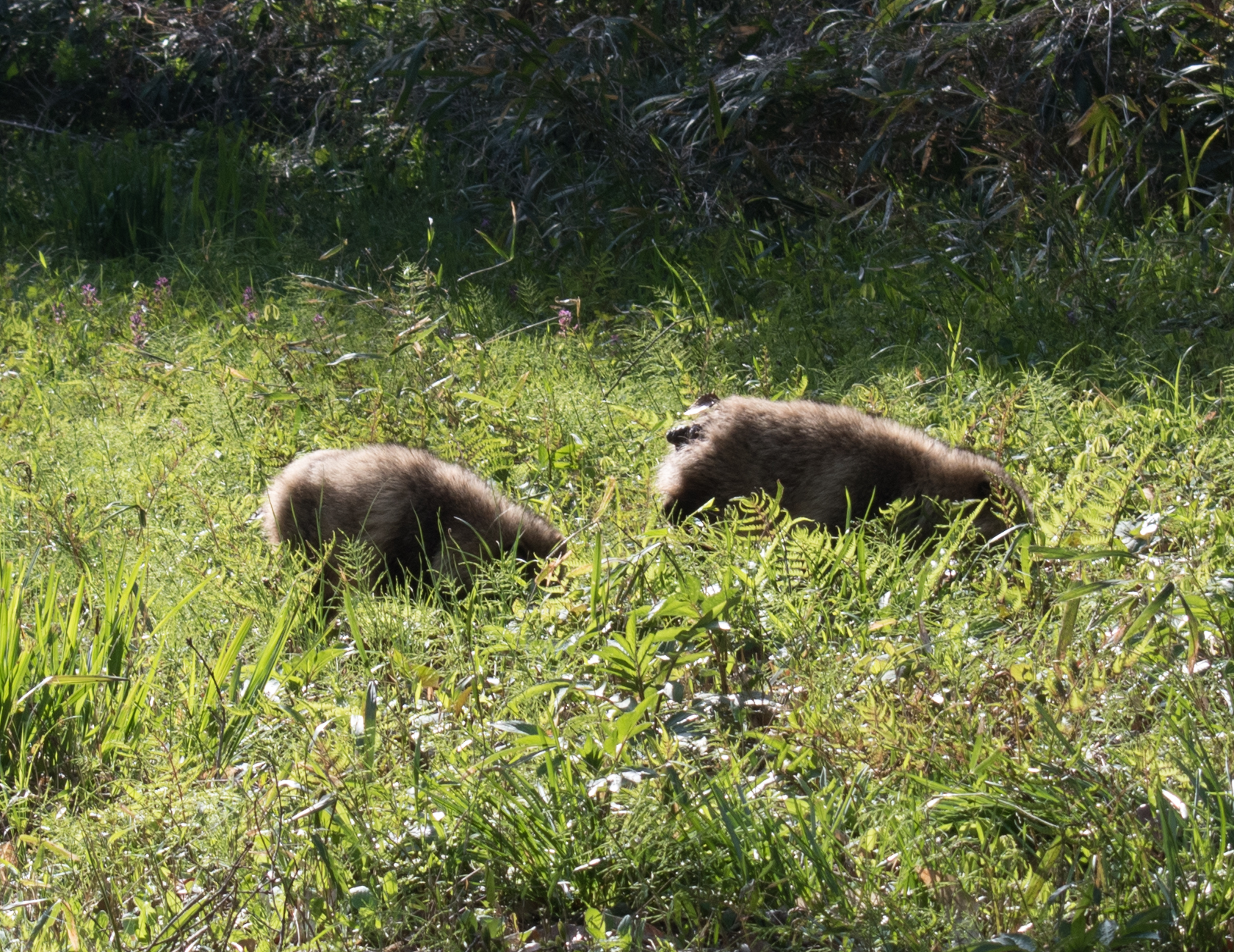
Tanuki (Japanese raccoon dogs)

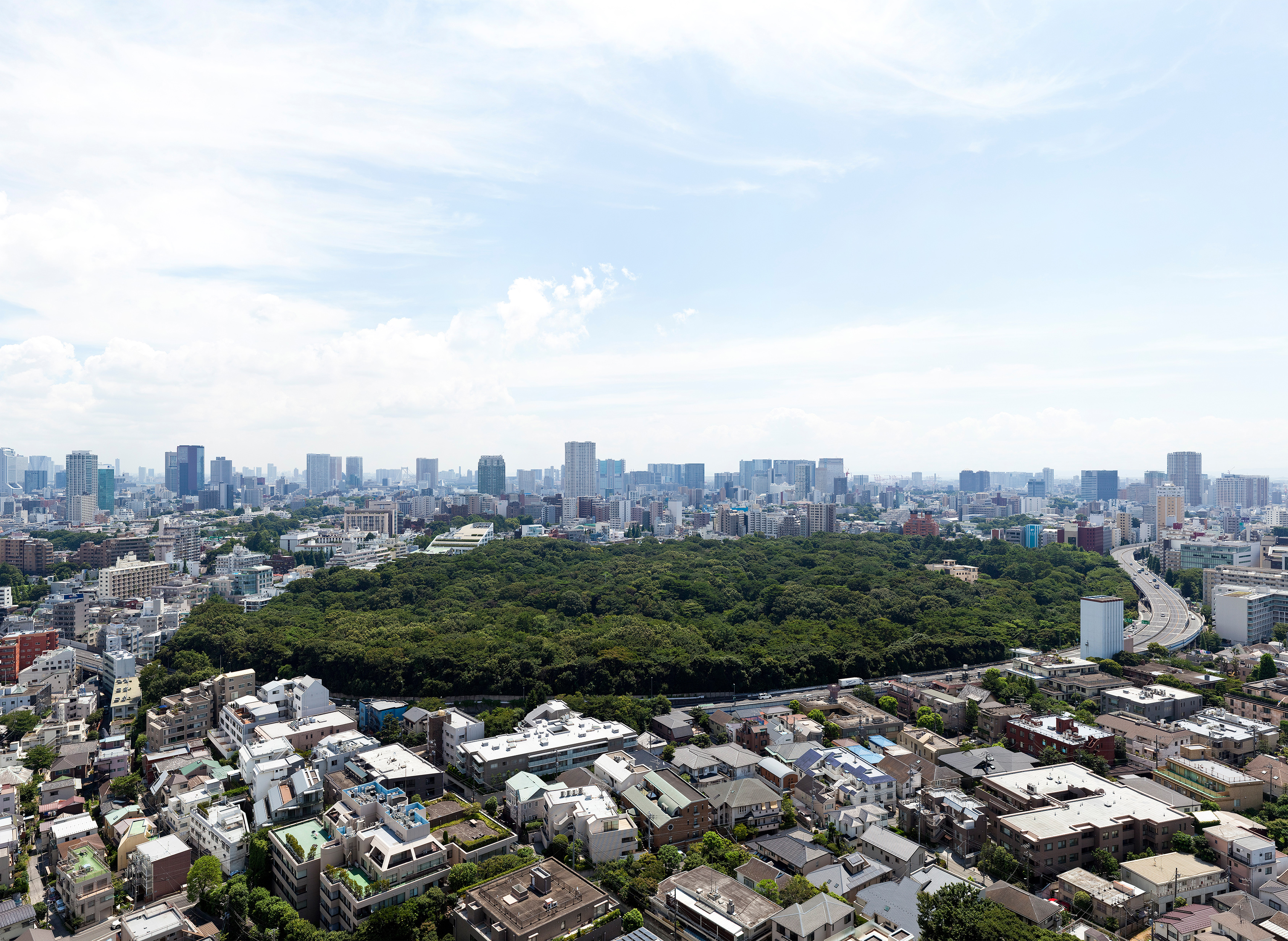
Panoramic view in 2012

== See also ==
- List of Historic Sites of Japan (Tōkyō)
