= Takanawadai Station =

Metro station in Tokyo, Japan

Takanawadai Station 高輪台駅

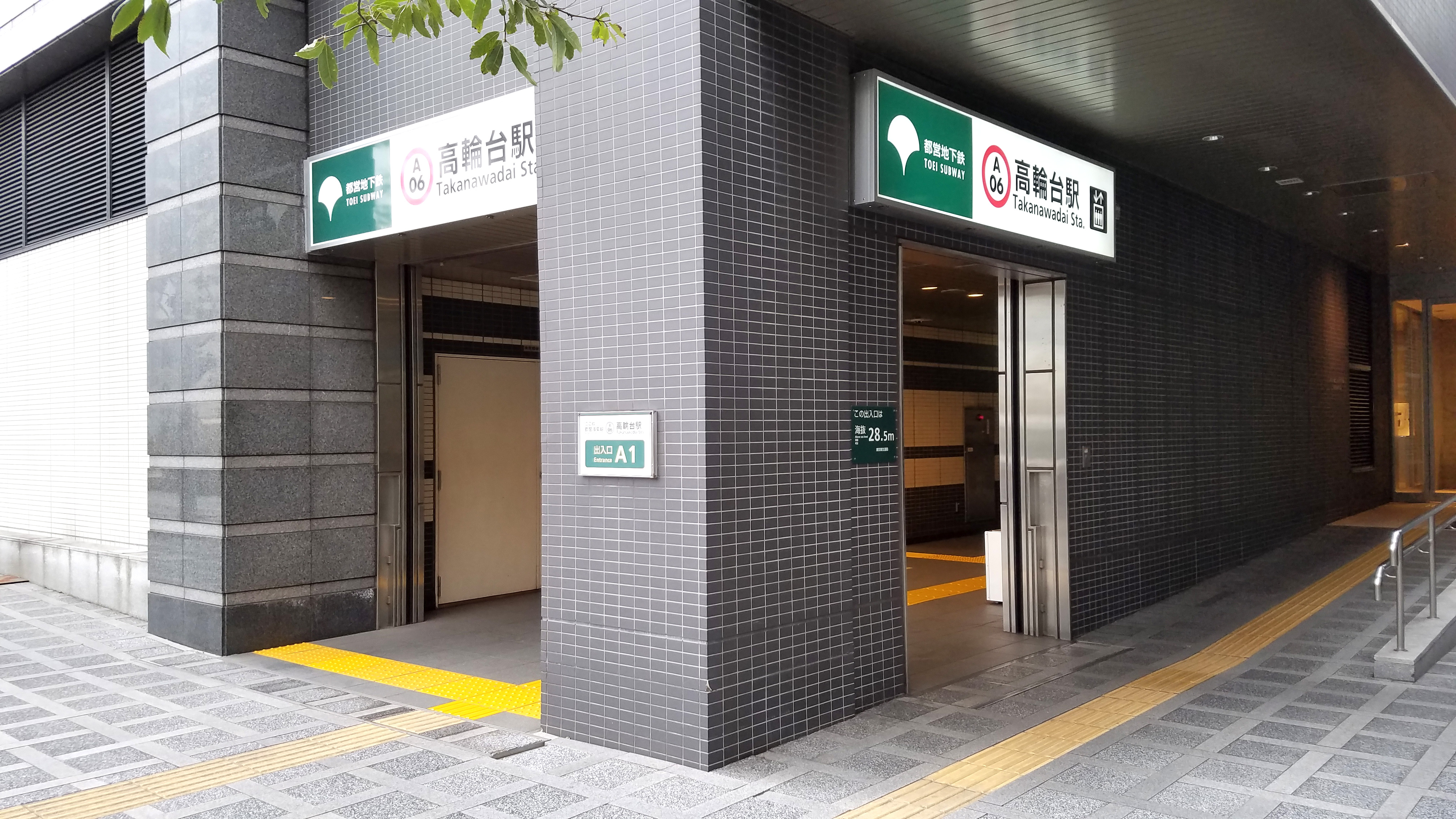
- Exit A1 in 2022

General information
- Location: 2-26-7 Shirokanedai, Minato City, Tokyo; Japan
- Coordinates: 35.6318°N 139.7303°E
- Operator: Toei Subway
- Line: Asakusa Line
- Platforms: 1 island platform
- Tracks: 2

Construction
- Structure type: Underground

Other information
- Station code: A-06
- Website: Official website

History
- Opened: 15 November 1968; 57 years ago

Services
| Preceding station | Toei Subway | Following station |
|---|---|---|
| Gotanda towards Nishi-magome | Asakusa Line | Sengakuji towards Oshiage |
Location
- Location within Tokyo Yamanote Loop Location within Tokyo wards area Location within Japan

Takanawadai Station (高輪台駅, Takanawadai-eki) is a subway station on the Toei Asakusa Line, operated by the Tokyo Metropolitan Bureau of Transportation. It is located in Minato, Tokyo, Japan. Its number is A-06.

The station serves the Shirokanedai neighborhood. Locations nearby include Meiji Gakuin University, various hotels such as the Grand Prince Takanawa and the New Grand Prince Takanawa, the Le Méridien Pacific Tokyo and the Takanawa Tobu, and housing for the House of Representatives.

== Station layout ==
Takanawadai Station is composed of a singular island platform serving two tracks.

=== Platforms ===
| 1 | Asakusa Line | for Nishi-magome |
| 2 | Asakusa Line | for Sengakuji, Nihombashi, and Oshiage; Keisei Main Line for Aoto, Keisei Takasago, Keisei Sakura, Keisei Narita, and Narita Airport (Terminal 2·3 and Terminal 1); Hokusō Line for Imba Nihon-idai; Narita Sky Access Line for Narita Airport; Shibayama Railway Line for Shibayama-Chiyoda |

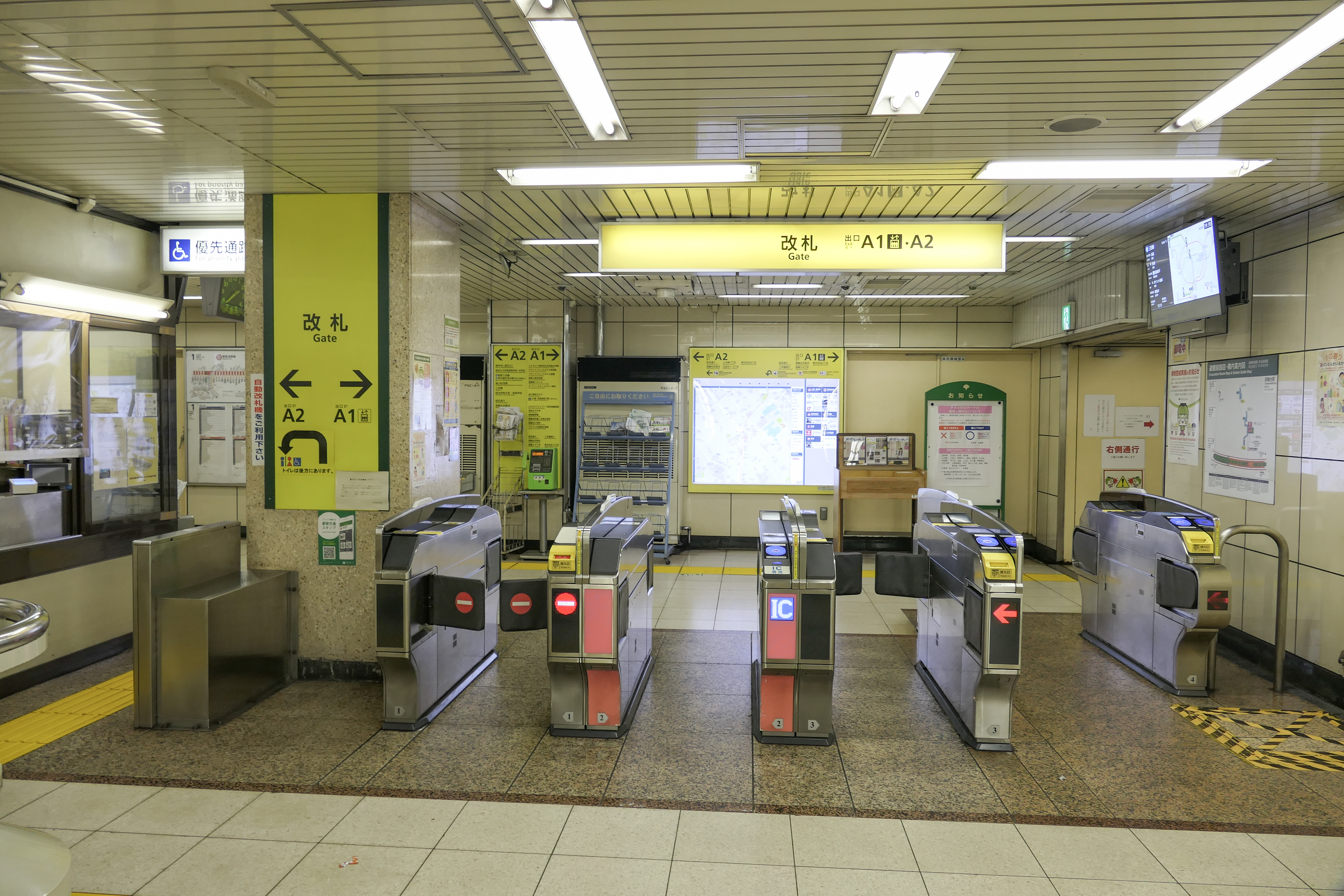
Ticket gate in 2023

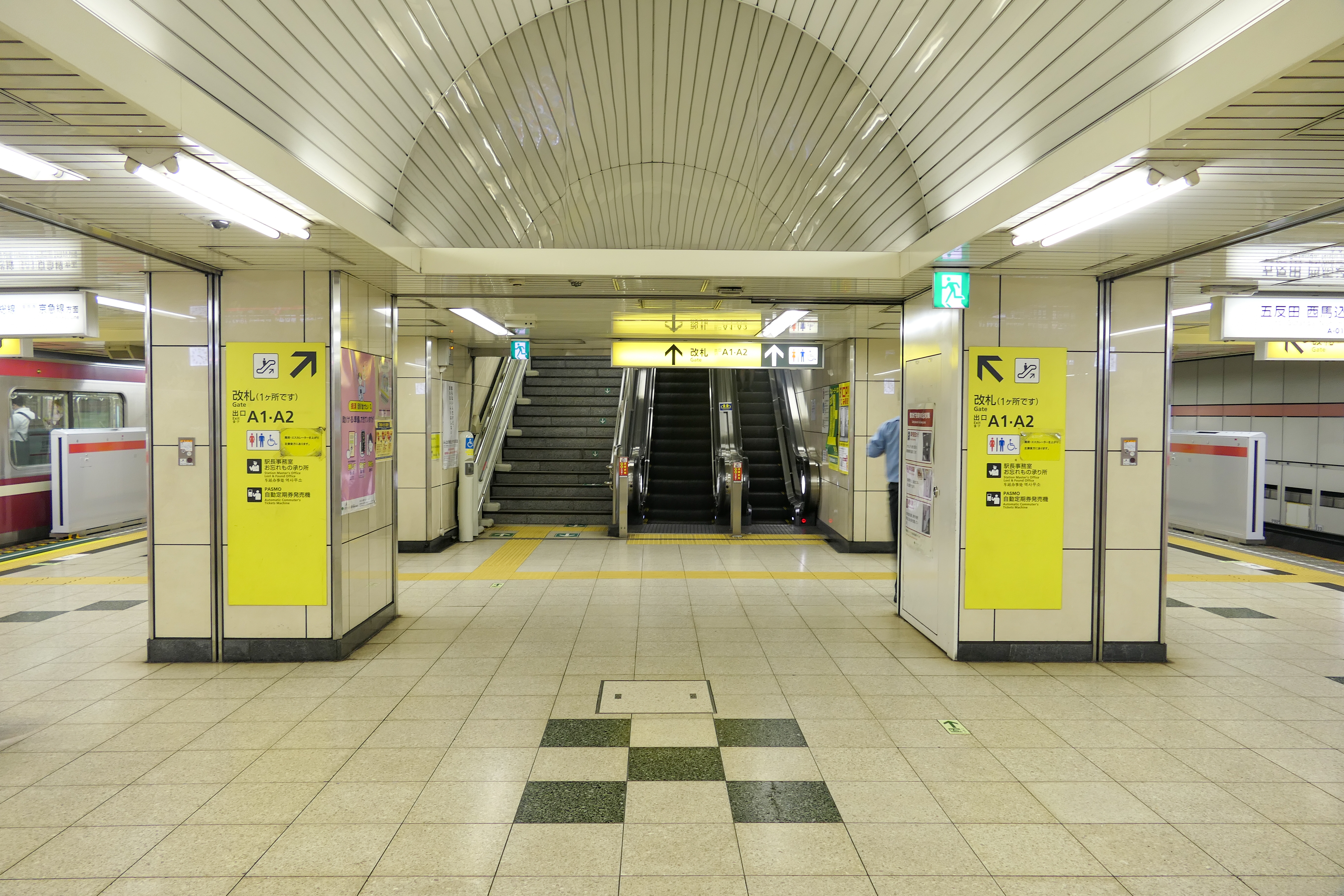
Platform in 2023

== History ==
Takanawadai Station opened on 15 November 1968, as a station on Toei Line 1. In 1978, the line was renamed to the Toei Asakusa Line.
