= Razbore =

Razbore is a place name that may refer to:

- Razbore, Šmartno pri Litiji, a village in the Municipality of Šmartno pri Litiji, central Slovenia
- Razbore, Trebnje, a village in the Municipalities of Trebnje and Šmartno pri Litiji, southeastern Slovenia
