= Preska =

Preska may refer to:

- Loretta Preska, Judge of the United States District Court for the Southern District of New York
- Preska nad Kostrevnico in the Municipality of Litija
- Preska pri Dobrniču in the Municipality of Trebnje
- Preska pri Medvodah in the Municipality of Medvode
- Preska, Sevnica in the Municipality of Sevnica
- Preska, Sodražica in the Municipality of Sodražica
