= Vrata, Šmartno pri Litiji =

Vrata
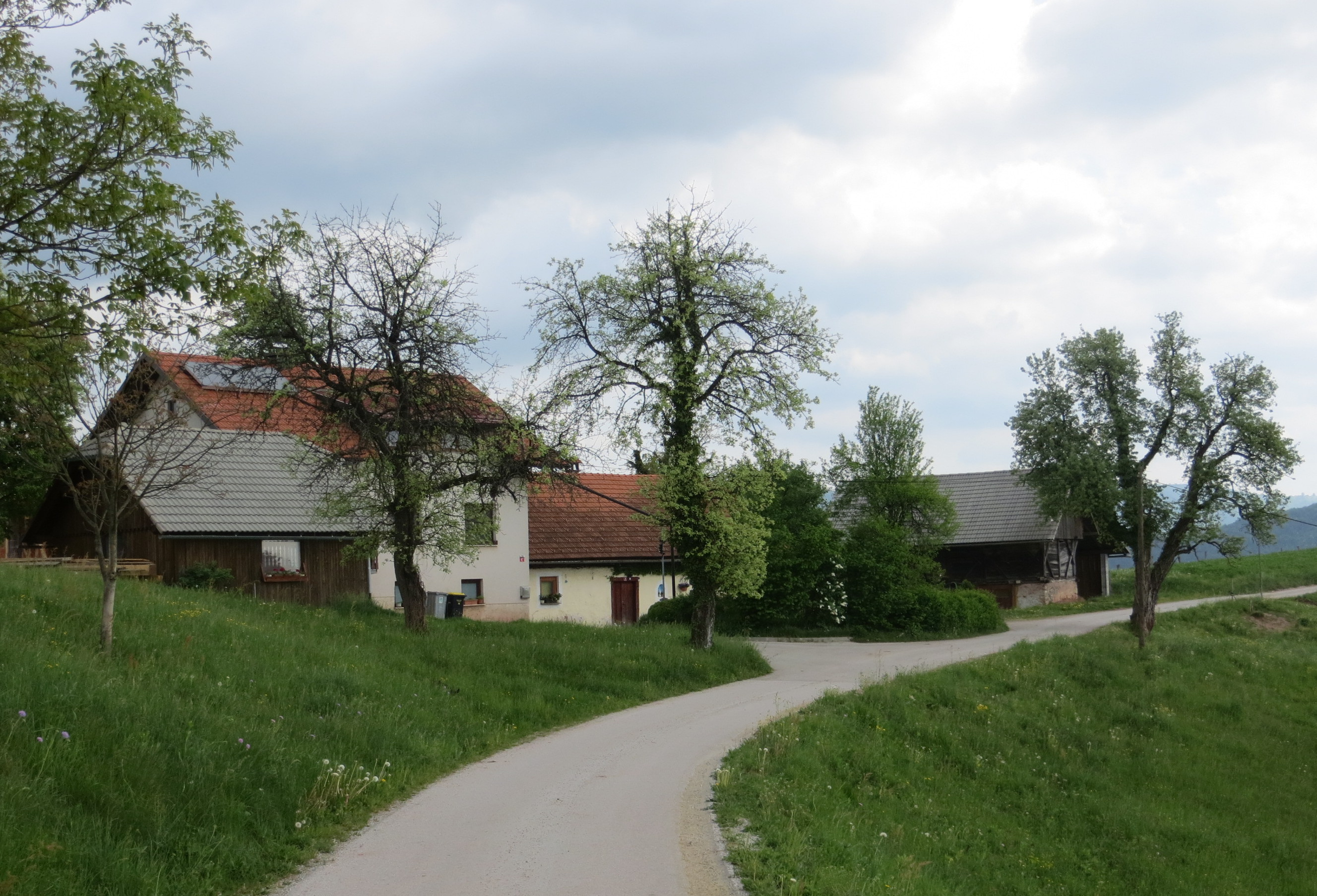

- Location in Slovenia
- Coordinates: 46°0′46.36″N 14°52′4.39″E
- Country: Slovenia
- Traditional region: Lower Carniola
- Statistical region: Central Slovenia
- Municipality: Šmartno pri Litiji

Area
  - Total: 1.01 km^{2} (0.39 sq mi)
- Elevation: 481.7 m (1,580 ft)

Population (2002)
  - Total: 39

Vrata (pronounced [ˈwɾaːta]) is a small settlement in the Municipality of Šmartno pri Litiji in central Slovenia. It lies in the hills south of Bogenšperk. The area is part of the historical region of Lower Carniola. The municipality is now included in the Central Slovenia Statistical Region.
