= Štanga =

Štanga may refer to the following places in Slovenia:

- Mala Štanga, settlement in the Municipality of Šmartno pri Litiji in central Slovenia
- Velika Štanga, settlement in the Municipality of Šmartno pri Litiji in central Slovenia
