= Lupinica =

- Location in Slovenia
- Coordinates: 46°1′13.64″N 14°53′9.89″E
- Country: Slovenia
- Traditional region: Lower Carniola
- Statistical region: Central Slovenia
- Municipality: Šmartno pri Litiji

Area
  - Total: 2.93 km^{2} (1.13 sq mi)
- Elevation: 326 m (1,070 ft)

Population (2002)
  - Total: 117

Lupinica (pronounced [luˈpiːnitsa]) is a settlement in the Municipality of Šmartno pri Litiji in central Slovenia. It lies at the end of a small valley southeast of Šmartno just beyond Velika Kostrevnica. The area is part of the historical region of Lower Carniola. The municipality is included in the Central Slovenia Statistical Region.
