= Koške Poljane =

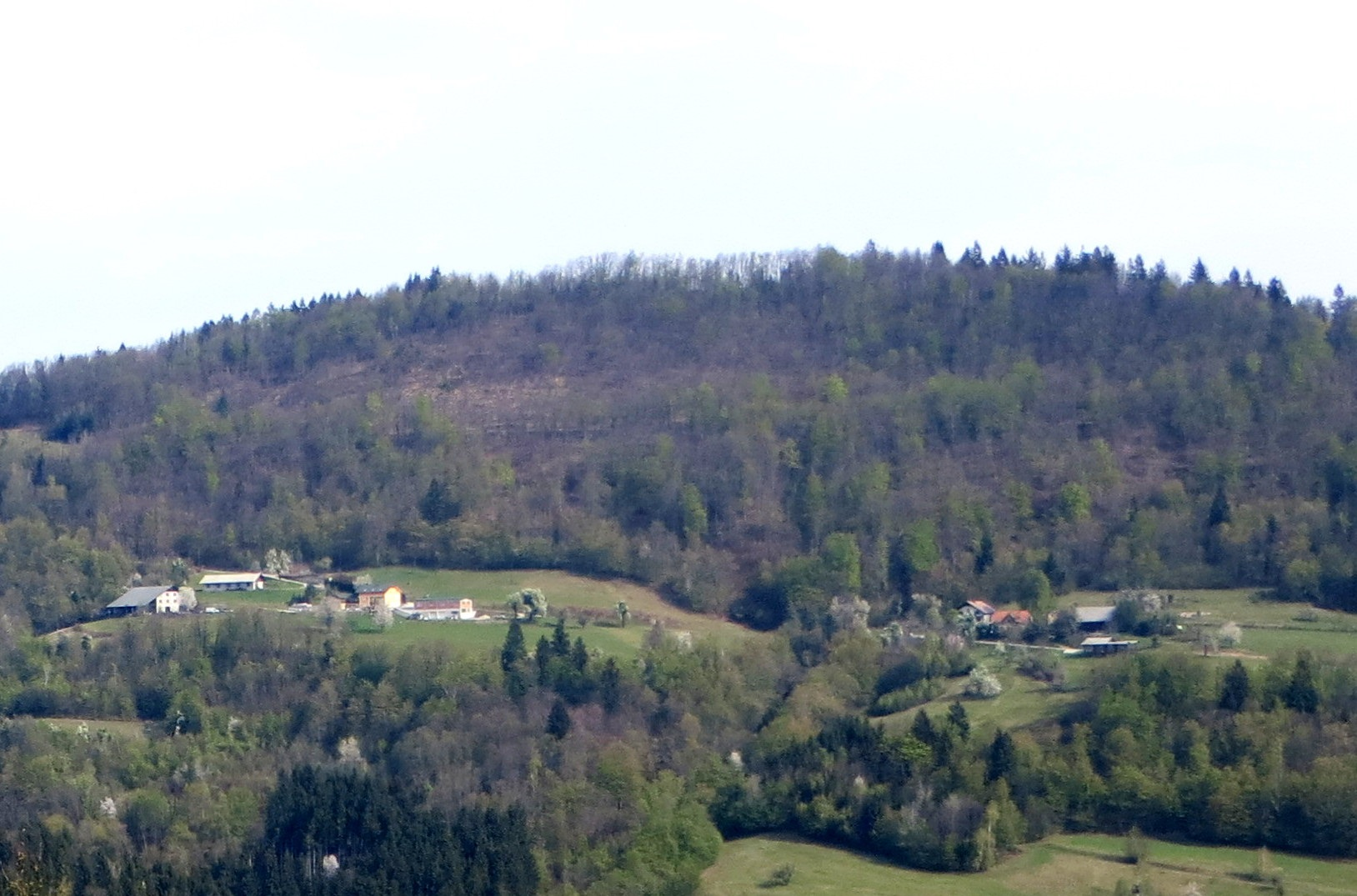

- Location in Slovenia
- Coordinates: 46°3′0.26″N 14°43′54.68″E
- Country: Slovenia
- Traditional region: Lower Carniola
- Statistical region: Central Slovenia
- Municipality: Šmartno pri Litiji

Area
  - Total: 1.72 km^{2} (0.66 sq mi)
- Elevation: 579.9 m (1,903 ft)

Population (2002)
  - Total: 6

Koške Poljane (pronounced [ˈkoːʃkɛ pɔˈljaːnɛ]) is a small dispersed settlement in the Municipality of Šmartno pri Litiji in central Slovenia. It lies in the Sava Hills (Slovene: Posavsko hribovje) west of Šmartno in the historical region of Lower Carniola. The municipality is included in the Central Slovenia Statistical Region.
