= Gozd–Reka =

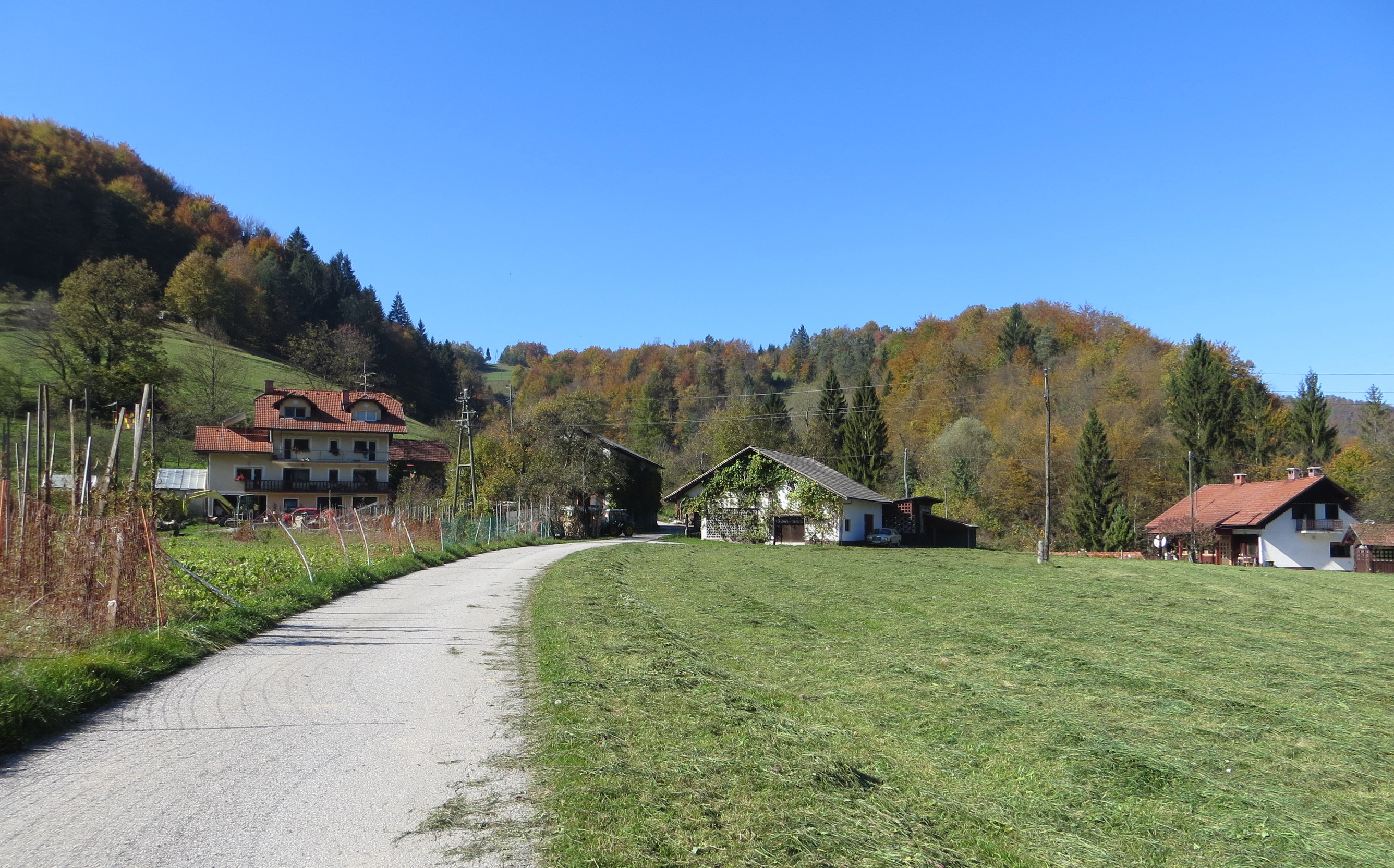

- Location in Slovenia
- Coordinates: 46°1′41.5″N 14°45′59.69″E
- Country: Slovenia
- Traditional region: Lower Carniola
- Statistical region: Central Slovenia
- Municipality: Šmartno pri Litiji

Area
  - Total: 7.7 km^{2} (3.0 sq mi)
- Elevation: 439.8 m (1,443 ft)

Population (2002)
  - Total: 143

Gozd–Reka (pronounced [ˈɡɔst ˈɾeːka]; Slovene: Gozd - Reka) is a dispersed settlement in the hills southwest of Šmartno pri Litiji in central Slovenia. It belongs to the Municipality of Šmartno pri Litiji, which is included in the Central Slovenia Statistical Region. The area is part of the traditional region of Lower Carniola.
