= Račica, Šmartno pri Litiji =

Račica
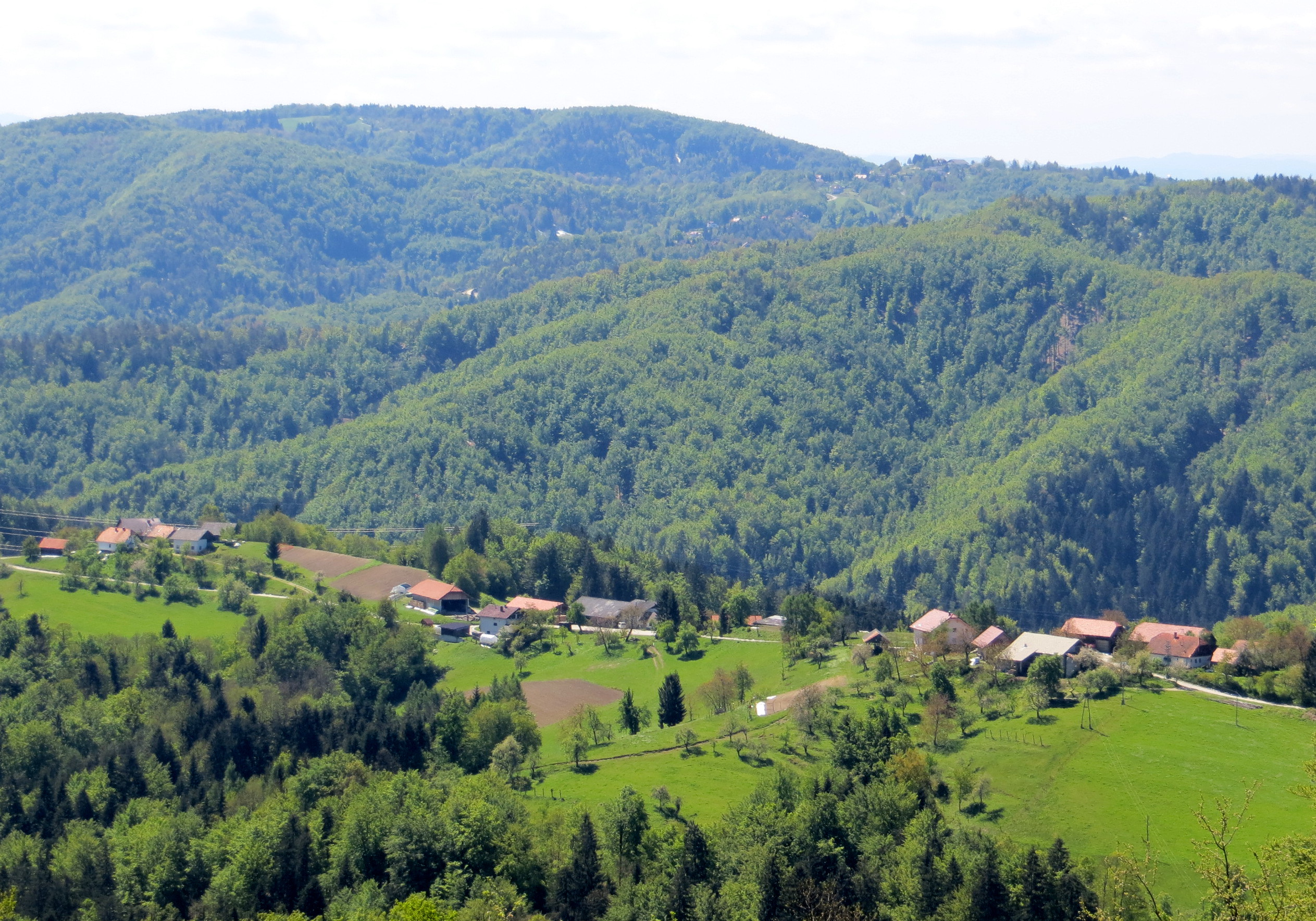

- Location in Slovenia
- Coordinates: 46°2′9.93″N 14°45′23.75″E
- Country: Slovenia
- Traditional region: Lower Carniola
- Statistical region: Central Slovenia
- Municipality: Šmartno pri Litiji

Area
  - Total: 2.36 km^{2} (0.91 sq mi)
- Elevation: 493.4 m (1,619 ft)

Population (2002)
  - Total: 52

Račica (pronounced [ˈɾaːtʃitsa]; in older sources also Raščica) is a settlement in the Municipality of Šmartno pri Litiji in central Slovenia. It lies in the hills west of Šmartno pri Litiji in the historical region of Lower Carniola. The area is included in the Central Slovenia Statistical Region.
