= Podroje =

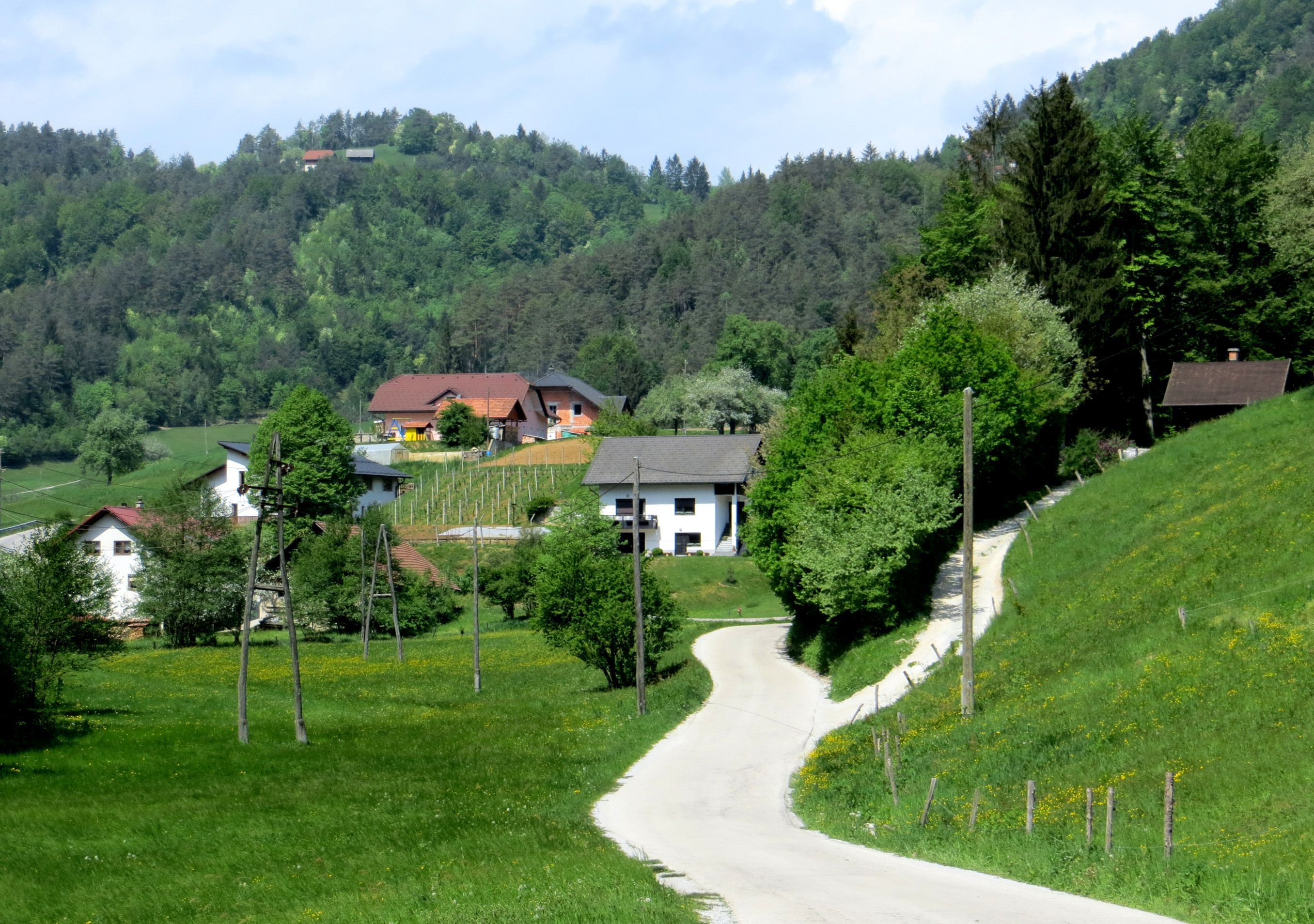

- Location in Slovenia
- Coordinates: 46°1′20.79″N 14°49′12.27″E
- Country: Slovenia
- Traditional region: Lower Carniola
- Statistical region: Central Slovenia
- Municipality: Šmartno pri Litiji

Area
  - Total: 2.04 km^{2} (0.79 sq mi)
- Elevation: 335.4 m (1,100 ft)

Population (2002)
  - Total: 118

Podroje (pronounced [pɔˈdɾoːjɛ]) is a small settlement in the Municipality of Šmartno pri Litiji in central Slovenia. It lies in the hills southwest of Šmartno. The area is part of the historical region of Lower Carniola. The municipality is now included in the Central Slovenia Statistical Region.

An Iron Age hillfort has been identified on Roje Hill above the settlement.

== Notable people ==
Notable people that were born or lived in Podroje include:

- Davorin Hostnik (a.k.a. Trnovski; 1853–1929), writer
