= Zavrstnik =

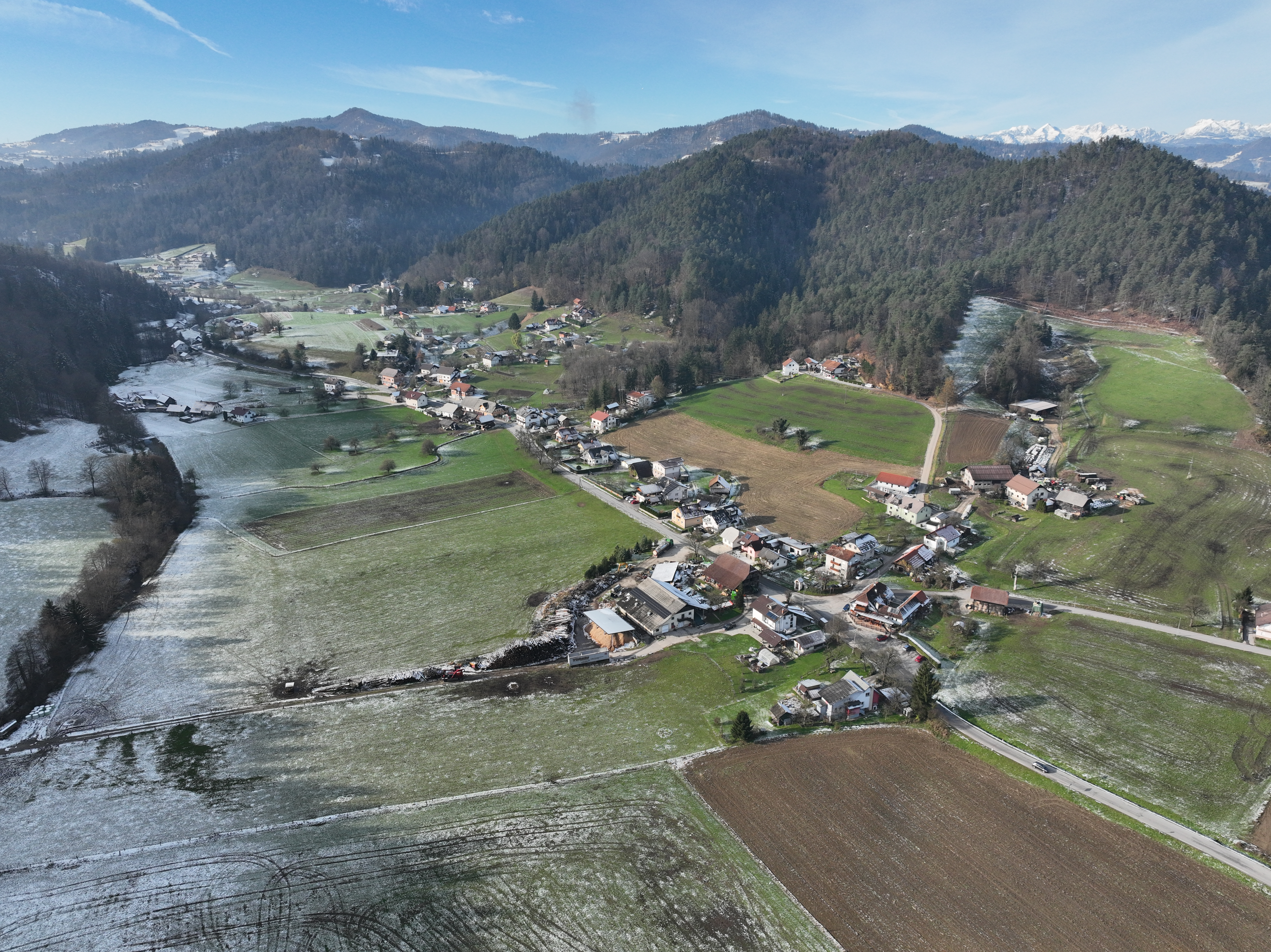

- Location in Slovenia
- Coordinates: 46°2′51.81″N 14°49′14.31″E
- Country: Slovenia
- Traditional region: Lower Carniola
- Statistical region: Central Slovenia
- Municipality: Šmartno pri Litiji

Area
  - Total: 5.23 km^{2} (2.02 sq mi)
- Elevation: 287.3 m (943 ft)

Population (2002)
  - Total: 348

Zavrstnik (pronounced [zaˈʋəɾstnik] or [zaʋəɾsˈtniːk]) is a settlement in the Municipality of Šmartno pri Litiji in central Slovenia. It lies in a small valley east of the town of Šmartno pri Litiji in the historical region of Lower Carniola. The municipality is now included in the Central Slovenia Statistical Region.

== Castle ==
Grmače Castle (German: Grünhof) was built in 1646 and stood on the east edge of Zavrstnik. It was owned by Baron Apfaltern of Vienna until the Second World War. The castle was burned by the Partisans during the war. After the war the remaining buildings were used by the Litija Collective Farm (Slovene: KZ Litija).
