= Obla Gorica =

- Location in Slovenia
- Coordinates: 45°59′56.3″N 14°54′37.42″E
- Country: Slovenia
- Traditional region: Lower Carniola
- Statistical region: Central Slovenia
- Municipality: Šmartno pri Litiji

Area
  - Total: 1.13 km^{2} (0.44 sq mi)
- Elevation: 520.2 m (1,707 ft)

Population (2002)
  - Total: 20

Obla Gorica (pronounced [ˈoːbla ɡɔˈɾiːtsa]) is a small dispersed settlement in the Sava Hills (Slovene: Posavsko hribovje) southeast of Šmartno pri Litiji in central Slovenia. The area is part of the traditional region of Lower Carniola, and the Municipality of Šmartno pri Litiji is now included in the Central Slovenia Statistical Region.
