= Vinji Vrh, Šmartno pri Litiji =

Vinji Vrh
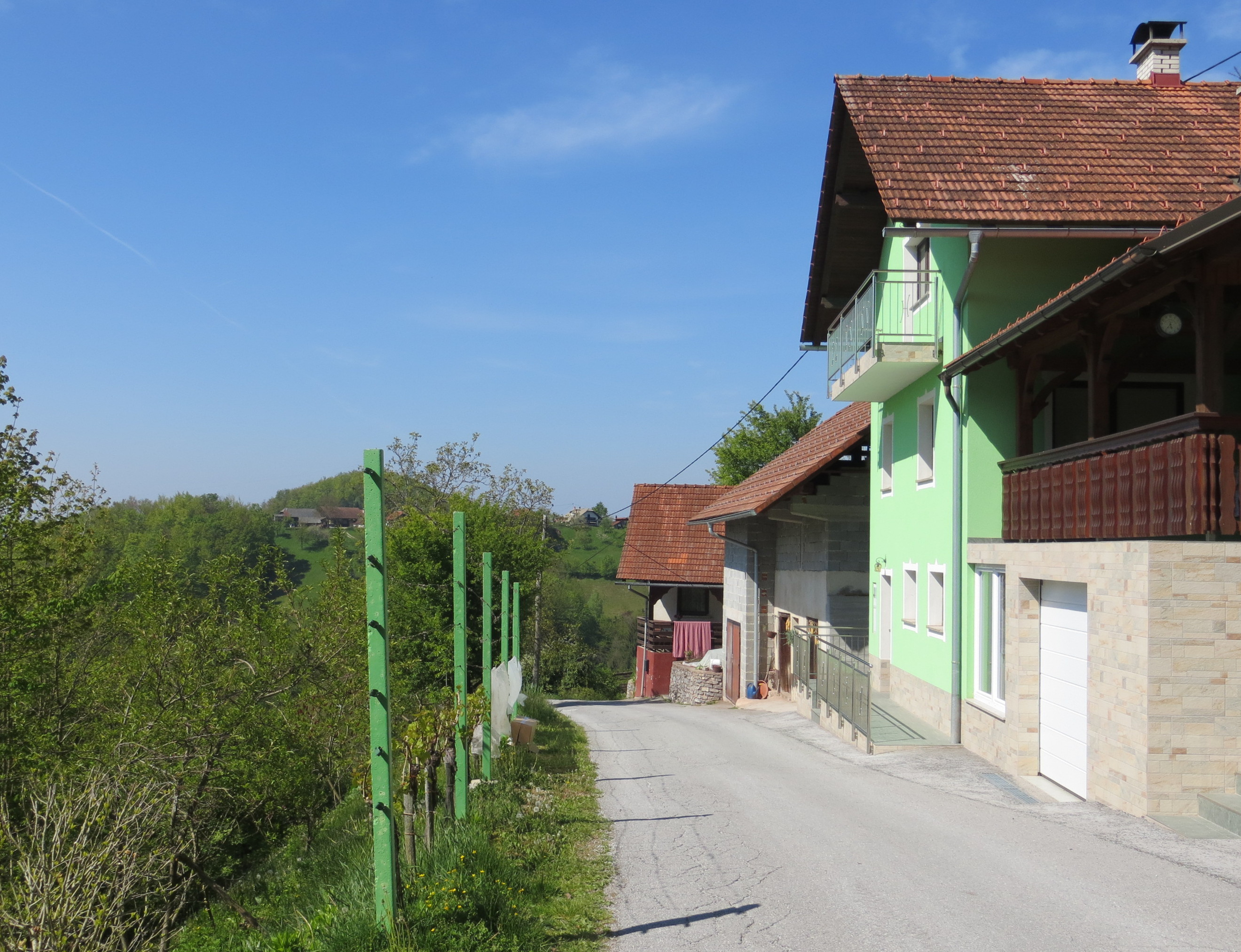

- Location in Slovenia
- Coordinates: 46°0′7.98″N 14°54′53.21″E
- Country: Slovenia
- Traditional region: Lower Carniola
- Statistical region: Central Slovenia
- Municipality: Šmartno pri Litiji

Area
  - Total: 0.57 km^{2} (0.22 sq mi)
- Elevation: 511.8 m (1,679 ft)

Population (2002)
  - Total: 10

Vinji Vrh (pronounced [ˈʋiːnji ˈʋəɾx]) is a small settlement in the hills southeast of Šmartno pri Litiji in central Slovenia. The area is part of the historical region of Lower Carniola. The Municipality of Šmartno pri Litiji is now included in the Central Slovenia Statistical Region.

A late Bronze Age and Iron Age hillfort with an associated burial ground has been identified and partially investigated in the settlement.
