= Riharjevec =

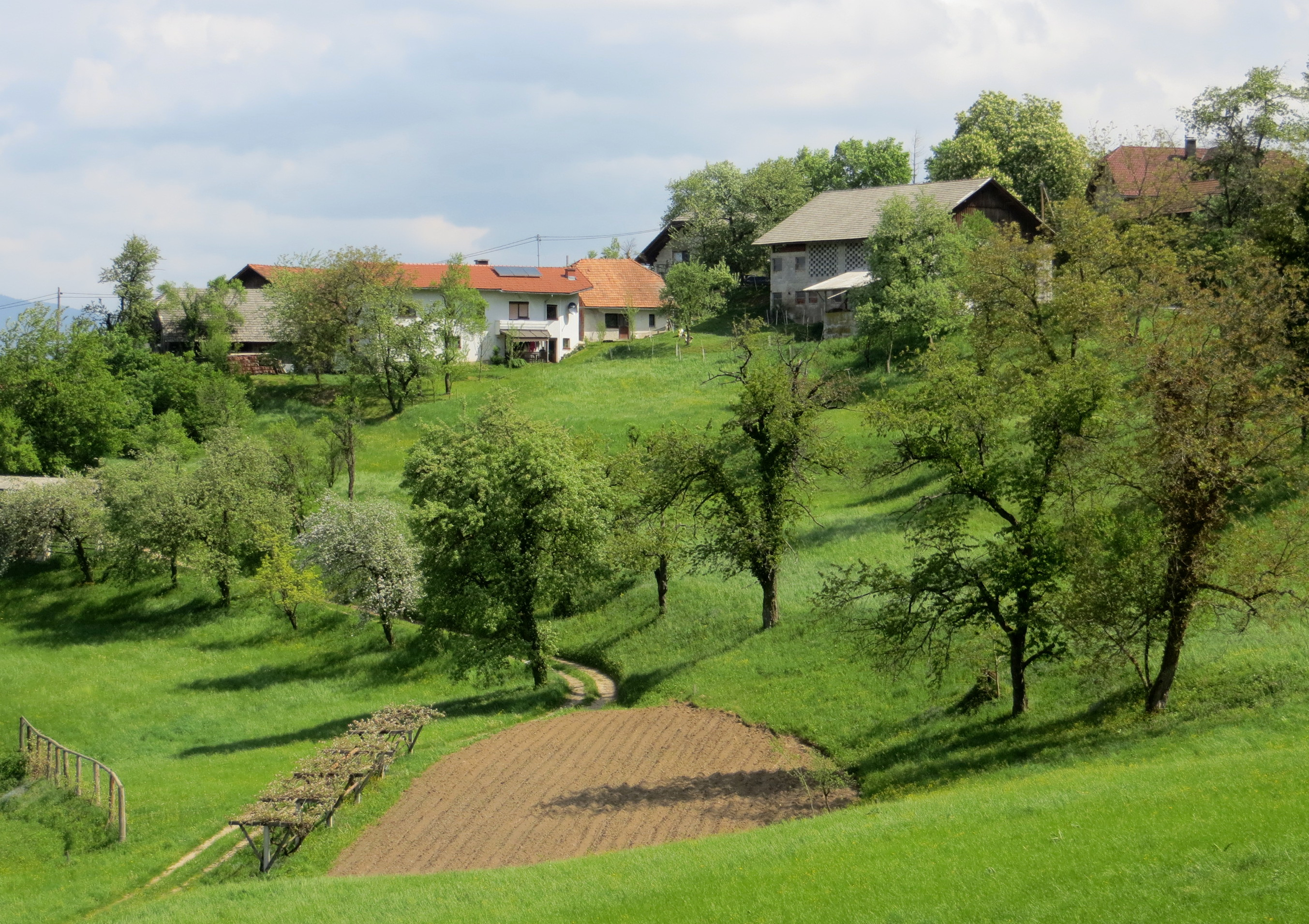

- Location in Slovenia
- Coordinates: 46°1′0.16″N 14°50′19.29″E
- Country: Slovenia
- Traditional region: Lower Carniola
- Statistical region: Central Slovenia
- Municipality: Šmartno pri Litiji

Area
  - Total: 2.4 km^{2} (0.93 sq mi)
- Elevation: 420.3 m (1,379 ft)

Population (2002)
  - Total: 58

Riharjevec (pronounced [ˈɾiːxaɾjɛʋəts], German: Richarjewz or Richarjeuz) is a settlement in the hills just south of Šmartno pri Litiji in central Slovenia. The area is part of the historical region of Lower Carniola. The Municipality of Šmartno pri Litiji is included in the Central Slovenia Statistical Region.
