= Zagrič =

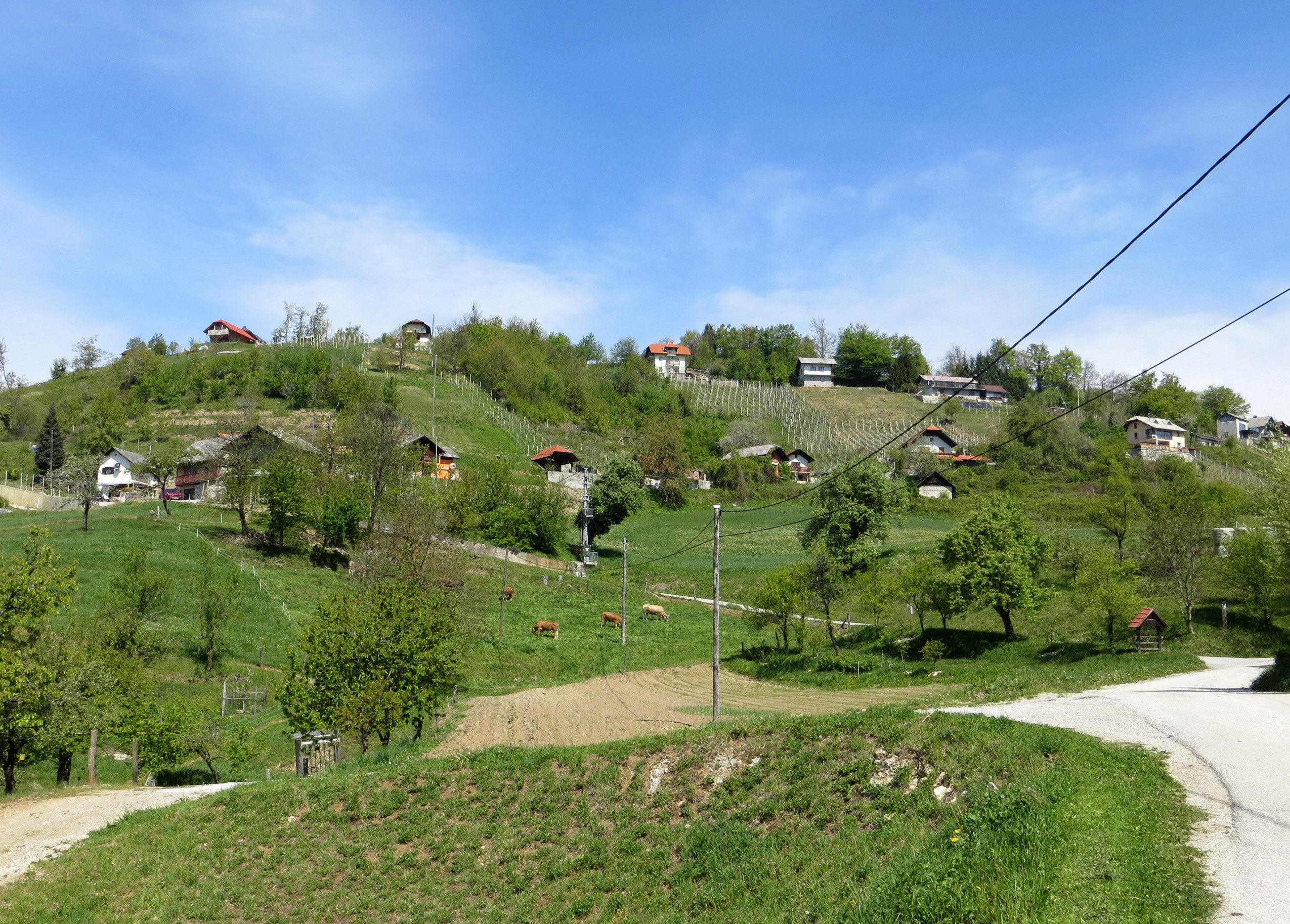

- Location in Slovenia
- Coordinates: 45°58′38.96″N 14°56′29.05″E
- Country: Slovenia
- Traditional region: Lower Carniola
- Statistical region: Central Slovenia
- Municipality: Šmartno pri Litiji

Area
  - Total: 1.05 km^{2} (0.41 sq mi)
- Elevation: 543.3 m (1,782 ft)

Population (2002)
  - Total: 12

Zagrič (pronounced [zaˈɡɾiːtʃ]; formerly Lačni Vrh or Lačenberg, German: Latschenberg) is a small dispersed settlement in the hills northwest of Čatež in the historical region of Lower Carniola in Slovenia. It belongs to the Municipality of Šmartno pri Litiji and is included in the Central Slovenia Statistical Region.
