= Stara Gora pri Velikem Gabru =

- Location in Slovenia
- Coordinates: 45°59′35.88″N 14°54′12.82″E
- Country: Slovenia
- Traditional region: Lower Carniola
- Statistical region: Central Slovenia
- Municipality: Šmartno pri Litiji

Area
  - Total: 0.5 km^{2} (0.19 sq mi)
- Elevation: 445 m (1,460 ft)

Population (2023)
  - Total: 35

Stara Gora pri Velikem Gabru (pronounced [ˈstaːɾa ˈɡɔːɾa pɾi ˈʋeːlikɛm ˈɡaːbɾu]) is a small settlement in the hills north of Veliki Gaber in the historical region of Lower Carniola in Slovenia. It belongs to the Municipality of Šmartno pri Litiji. The municipality is included in the Central Slovenia Statistical Region.

== Name ==
The name of the settlement was changed from Stara Gora to Stara Gora pri Velikem Gabru in 1953.
