= Bukovica pri Litiji =

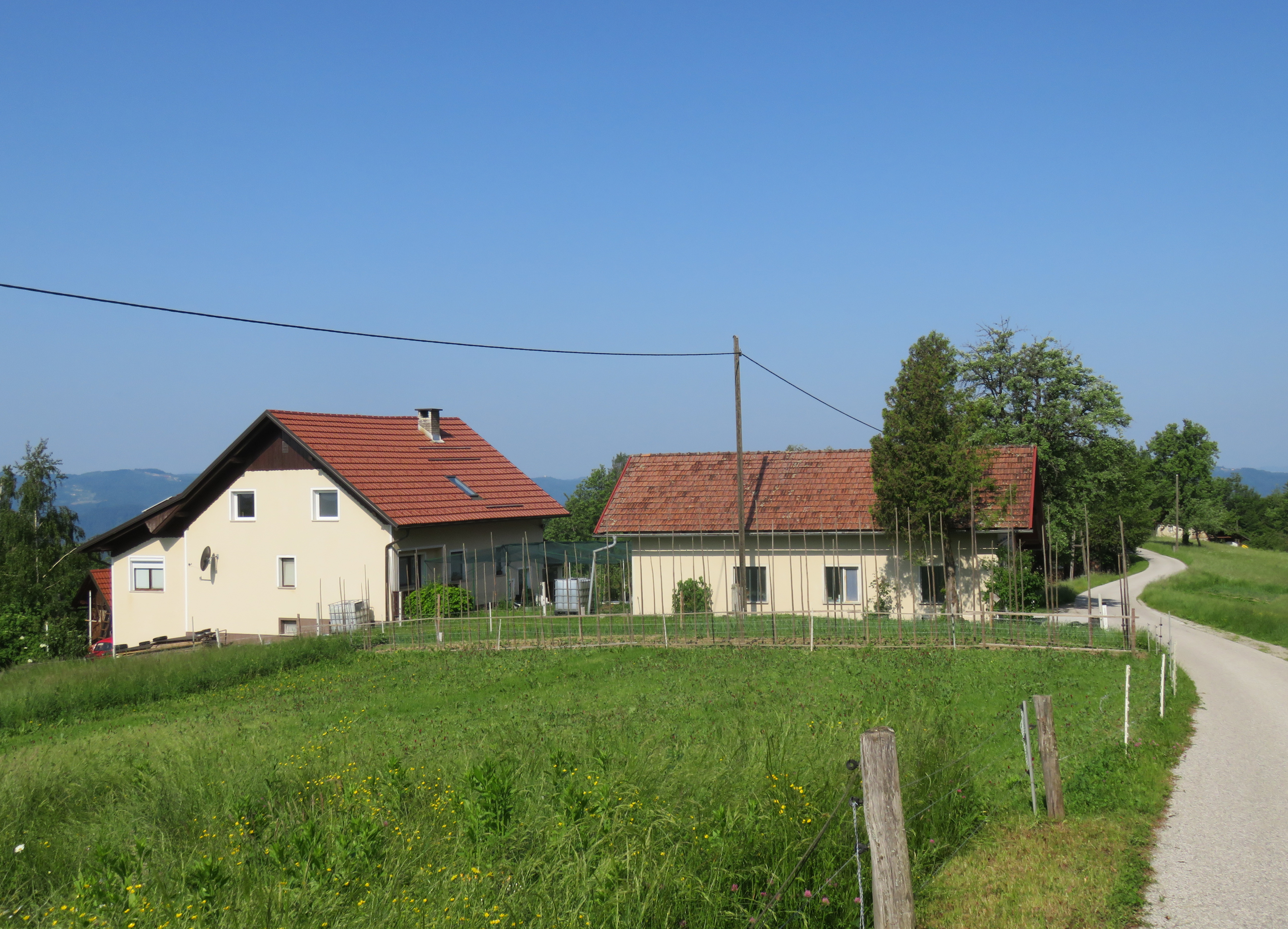

- Location in Slovenia
- Coordinates: 46°2′39.89″N 14°54′55.31″E
- Country: Slovenia
- Traditional region: Lower Carniola
- Statistical region: Central Slovenia
- Municipality: Šmartno pri Litiji

Area
  - Total: 0.44 km^{2} (0.17 sq mi)
- Elevation: 620.7 m (2,036 ft)

Population (2002)
  - Total: 32

Bukovica pri Litiji (pronounced [ˈbuːkɔʋitsa pɾi liˈtiːji]) is a small settlement in the Municipality of Šmartno pri Litiji in central Slovenia. It lies in the hills east of Šmartno in the historical region of Lower Carniola. The municipality is now included in the Central Slovenia Statistical Region.

== Name ==
The name of the settlement was changed from Bukovica to Bukovica pri Litiji (literally, 'Bukovica near Litija') in 1953. Bukovica is a common toponym and oronym in Slovenia. It is derived from the adjective bukov 'beech' (from bukev 'beech tree') and originally referred to the local vegetation.
