= Jastrebnik =

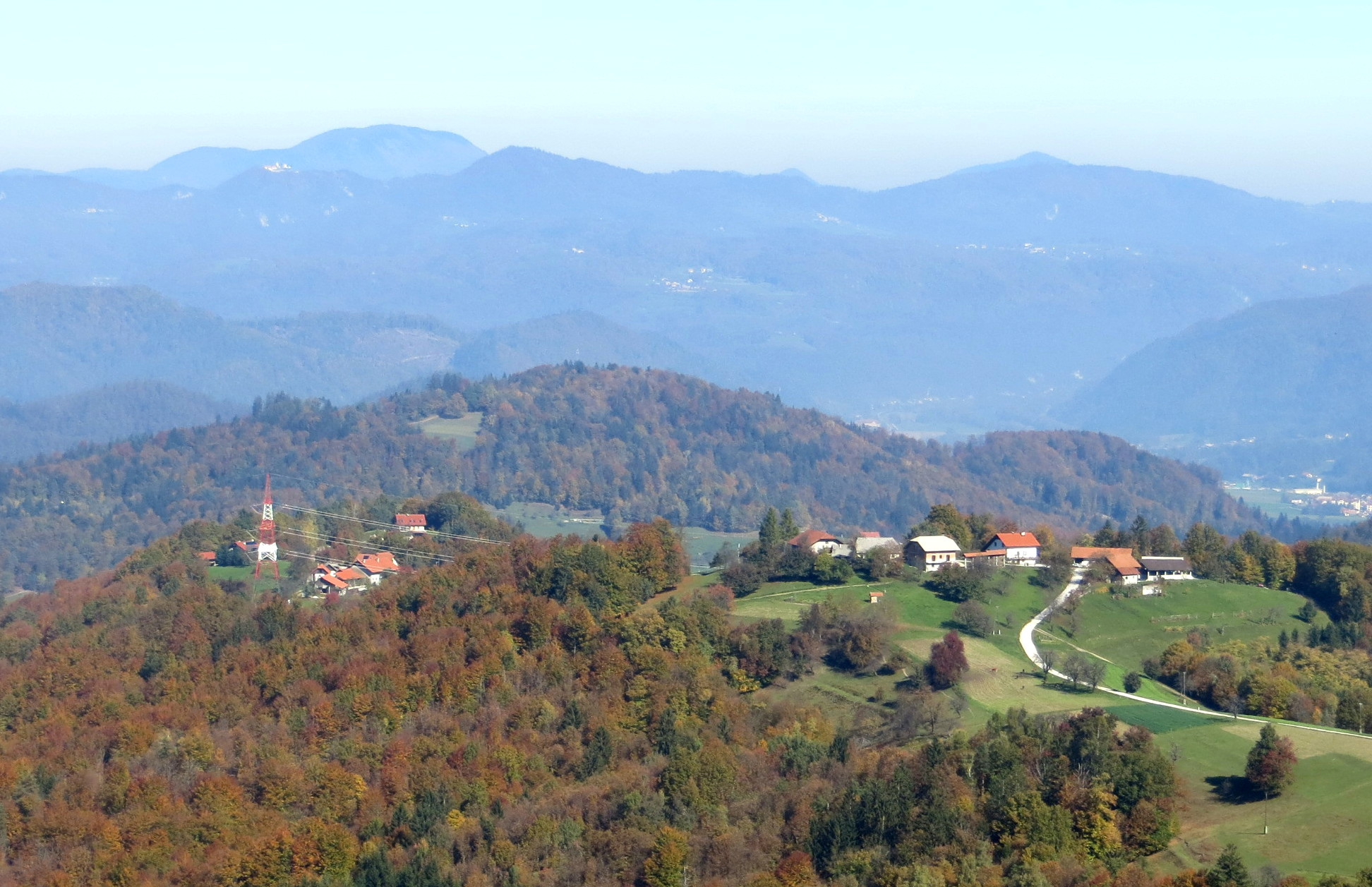

- Location in Slovenia
- Coordinates: 46°1′5.71″N 14°47′25.85″E
- Country: Slovenia
- Traditional region: Lower Carniola
- Statistical region: Central Slovenia
- Municipality: Šmartno pri Litiji

Area
  - Total: 1.63 km^{2} (0.63 sq mi)
- Elevation: 542.2 m (1,779 ft)

Population (2002)
  - Total: 32

Jastrebnik (pronounced [ˈjaːstɾɛbnik]) is a small dispersed settlement in the hills southwest of Šmartno pri Litiji in central Slovenia. The area is part of the historical region of Lower Carniola. The Municipality of Šmartno pri Litiji is now included in the Central Slovenia Statistical Region.
