= Leskovica pri Šmartnem =

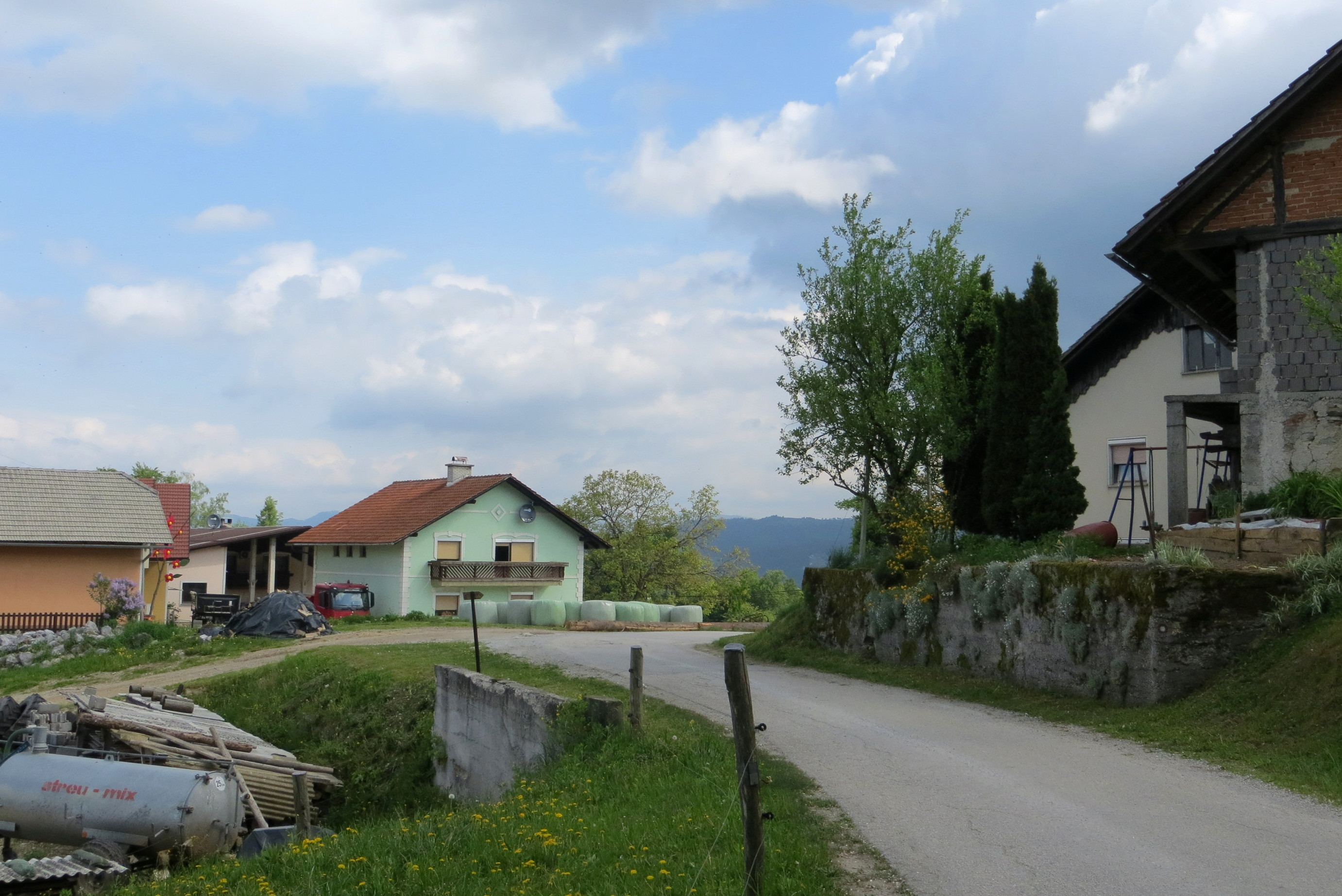

- Location in Slovenia
- Coordinates: 46°0′53.76″N 14°51′22.53″E
- Country: Slovenia
- Traditional region: Lower Carniola
- Statistical region: Central Slovenia
- Municipality: Šmartno pri Litiji

Area
  - Total: 1.17 km^{2} (0.45 sq mi)
- Elevation: 518 m (1,699 ft)

Population (2002)
  - Total: 65

Leskovica pri Šmartnem (pronounced [lɛˈskɔːʋitsa pɾi ˈʃmaːɾtnɛm]) is a settlement in the hills south of Šmartno pri Litiji in central Slovenia. The area is part of the historical region of Lower Carniola and is included in the Central Slovenia Statistical Region. It is around 25 km east of Ljubljana.

== Name ==
The name of the settlement was changed from Leskovica to Leskovica pri Šmartnem in 1953.
