= Črni Potok, Šmartno pri Litiji =

Črni Potok
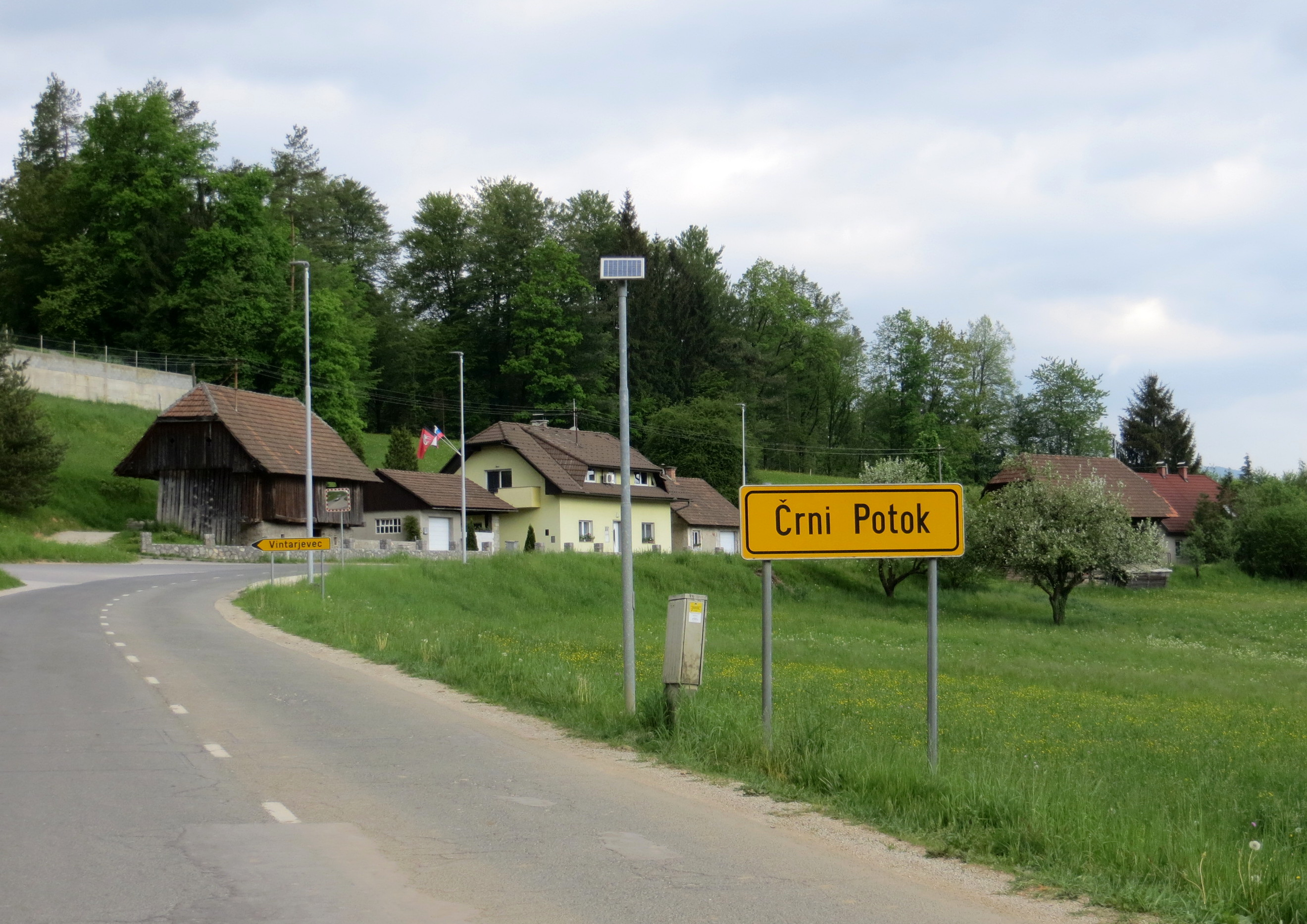

- Location in Slovenia
- Coordinates: 46°2′3.99″N 14°50′35.38″E
- Country: Slovenia
- Traditional region: Lower Carniola
- Statistical region: Central Slovenia
- Municipality: Šmartno pri Litiji

Area
  - Total: 2.83 km^{2} (1.09 sq mi)
- Elevation: 259.7 m (852 ft)

Population (2002)
  - Total: 130

Črni Potok (pronounced [ˈtʃəɾni ˈpɔːtɔk]; German: Schwarzenbach) is a dispersed settlement in the valley of Black Creek (Slovene: Črni potok) south of Šmartno pri Litiji in central Slovenia. The area is part of the historical region of Lower Carniola. The entire Municipality of Šmartno pri Litiji is now included in the Central Slovenia Statistical Region. It includes the hamlets of Brezje (formerly Sveti Križ, German: Heiligenkreuz) and Sela.

The local church, built on a small hill in the southwestern hamlet of Brezje, is dedicated to the Exaltation of the Holy Cross (Slovene: Povišanje svetega Križa) and belongs to the Parish of Šmartno. It dates to the 17th century.
