= Mulhe =

- Location in Slovenia
- Coordinates: 46°0′17.65″N 14°53′58.81″E
- Country: Slovenia
- Traditional region: Lower Carniola
- Statistical region: Central Slovenia
- Municipality: Šmartno pri Litiji

Area
  - Total: 0.53 km^{2} (0.20 sq mi)
- Elevation: 447.6 m (1,469 ft)

Population (2002)
  - Total: 13

Mulhe (pronounced [ˈmuːlxɛ]) is a small settlement in the Sava Hills (Slovene: Posavsko hribovje) in the Municipality of Šmartno pri Litiji in central Slovenia. The area is part of the traditional region of Lower Carniola and is now included in the Central Slovenia Statistical Region.
