= Ščit, Šmartno pri Litiji =

Ščit
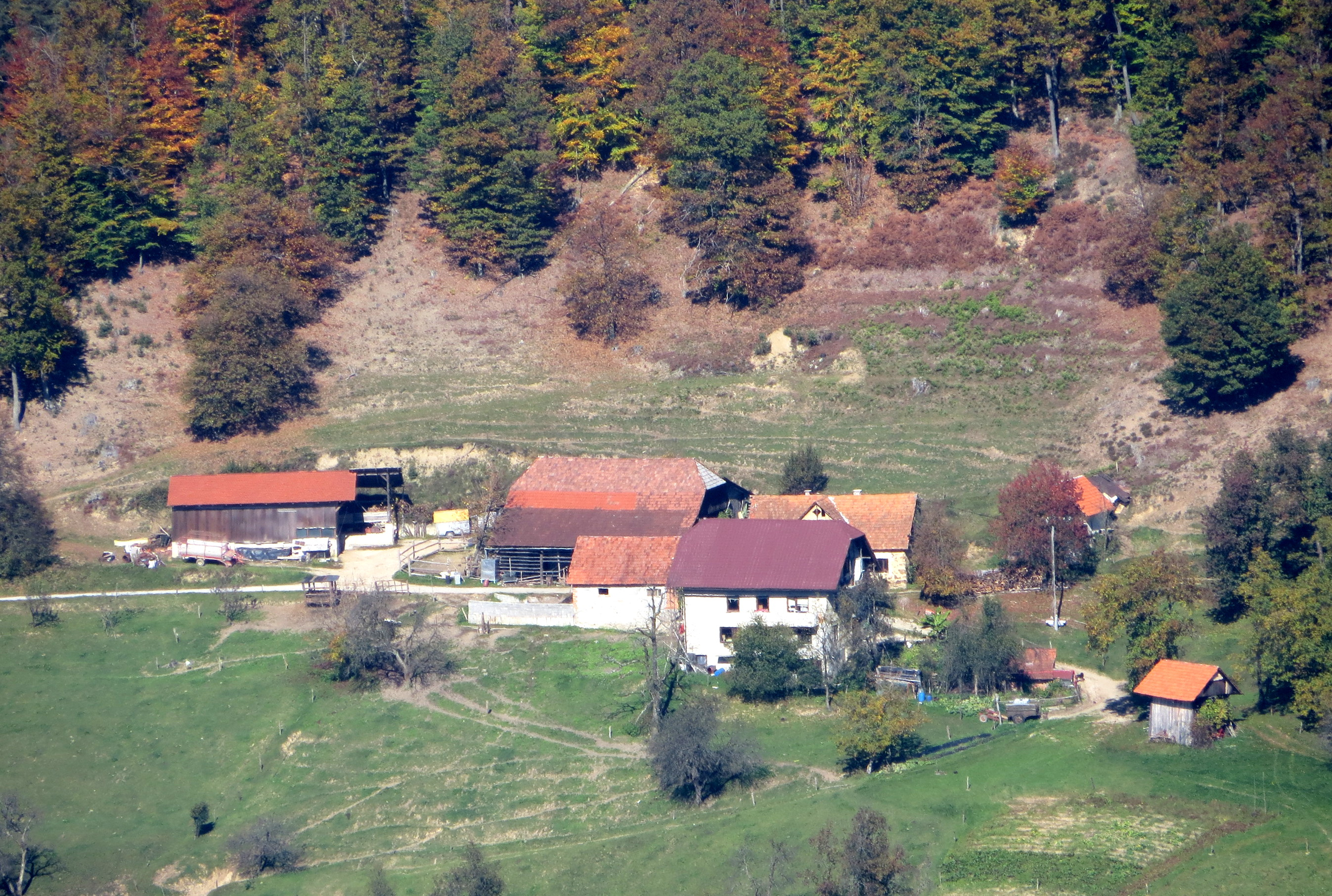

- Location in Slovenia
- Coordinates: 46°1′45.84″N 14°47′5.24″E
- Country: Slovenia
- Traditional region: Lower Carniola
- Statistical region: Central Slovenia
- Municipality: Šmartno pri Litiji

Area
  - Total: 2.76 km^{2} (1.07 sq mi)
- Elevation: 496.4 m (1,629 ft)

Population (2002)
  - Total: 17

Ščit (pronounced [ˈʃtʃiːt]) is a dispersed settlement in the Municipality of Šmartno pri Litiji in central Slovenia. It lies in the hills west of Šmartno. The area is part of the historical region of Lower Carniola. The municipality is included in the Central Slovenia Statistical Region.

== Name ==
Ščit was attested in written sources as Schilt in 1404 and Schiltt in 1499.
