= Selšek =

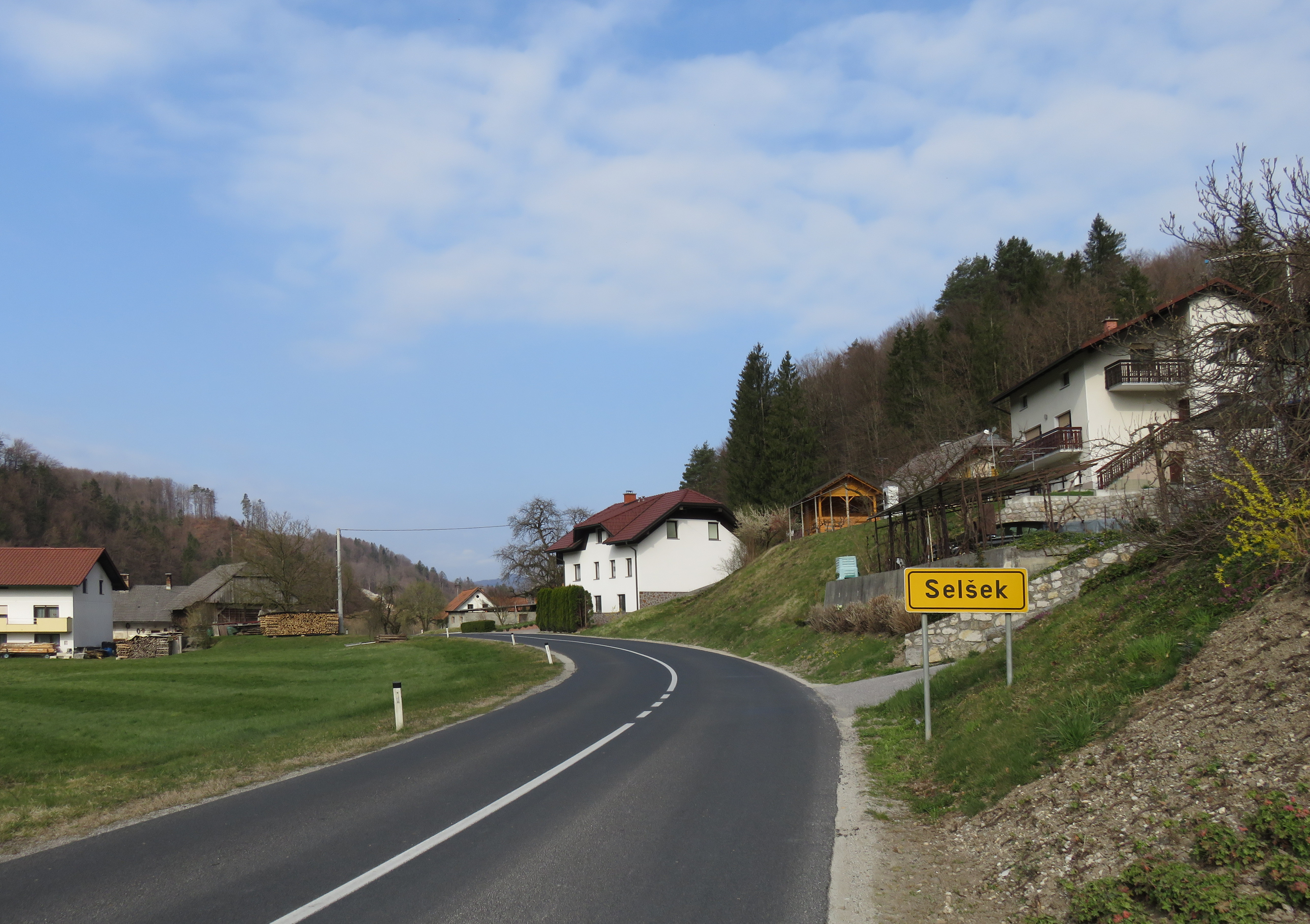

- Location in Slovenia
- Coordinates: 46°2′16.14″N 14°52′55.81″E
- Country: Slovenia
- Traditional region: Lower Carniola
- Statistical region: Central Slovenia
- Municipality: Šmartno pri Litiji

Area
  - Total: 0.39 km^{2} (0.15 sq mi)
- Elevation: 293.5 m (963 ft)

Population (2002)
  - Total: 74

Selšek (pronounced [ˈseːu̯ʃək]) is a small settlement in the Municipality of Šmartno pri Litiji in central Slovenia. It lies in the valley of Jablanica Creek (Slovene: Jablaniški potok) southeast of Litija. The area is part of the historical region of Lower Carniola. The municipality is now included in the Central Slovenia Statistical Region.
