= Višnji Grm =

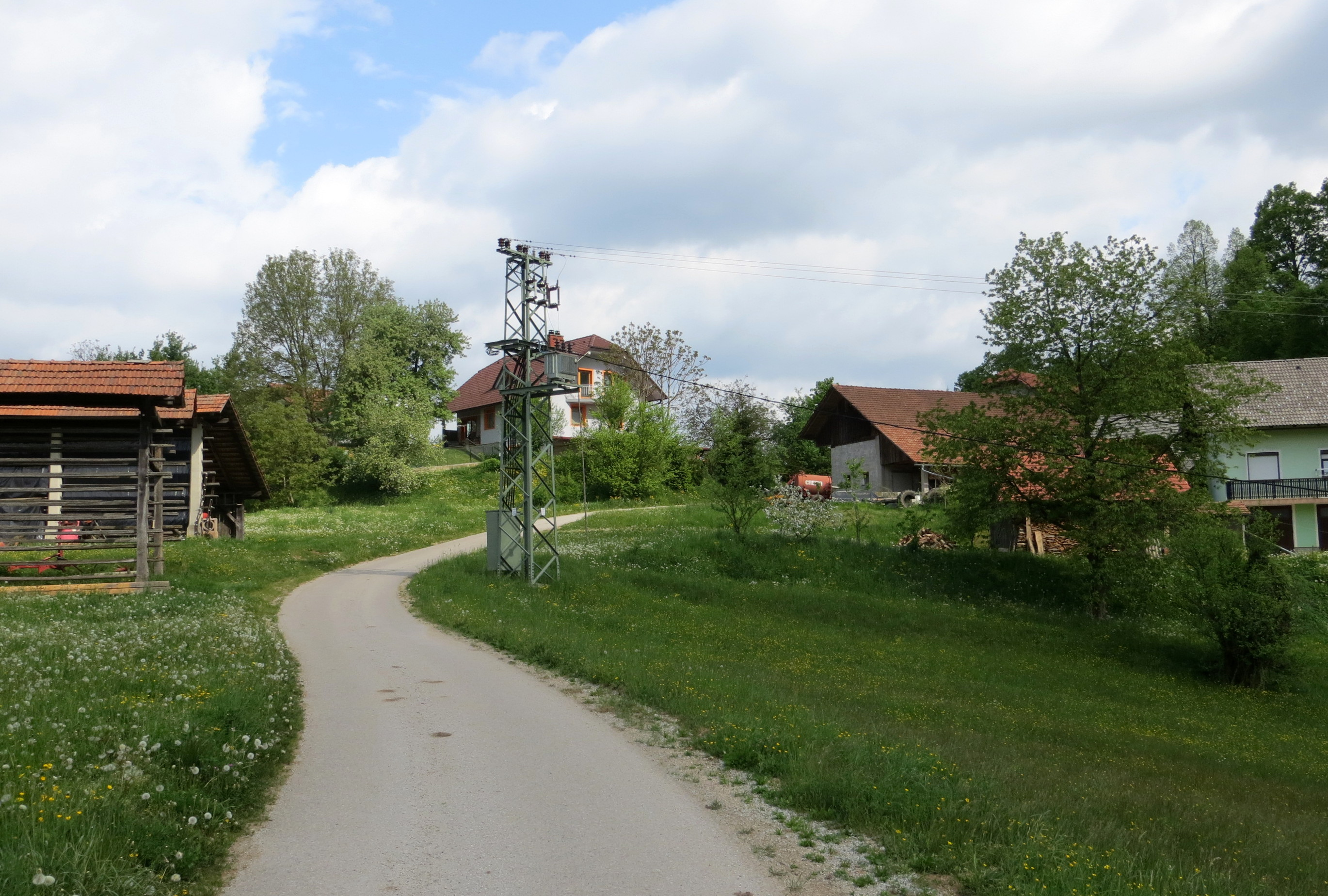

- Location in Slovenia
- Coordinates: 46°0′32.17″N 14°52′59.75″E
- Country: Slovenia
- Traditional region: Lower Carniola
- Statistical region: Central Slovenia
- Municipality: Šmartno pri Litiji

Area
  - Total: 0.57 km^{2} (0.22 sq mi)
- Elevation: 473.7 m (1,554 ft)

Population (2002)
  - Total: 16

Višnji Grm (pronounced [ˈʋiːʃnji ˈɡəɾm]) is a small settlement in the hills southeast of Šmartno pri Litiji in central Slovenia. The area is part of the historical region of Lower Carniola. The Municipality of Šmartno pri Litiji is now included in the Central Slovenia Statistical Region.
