= Liberga =

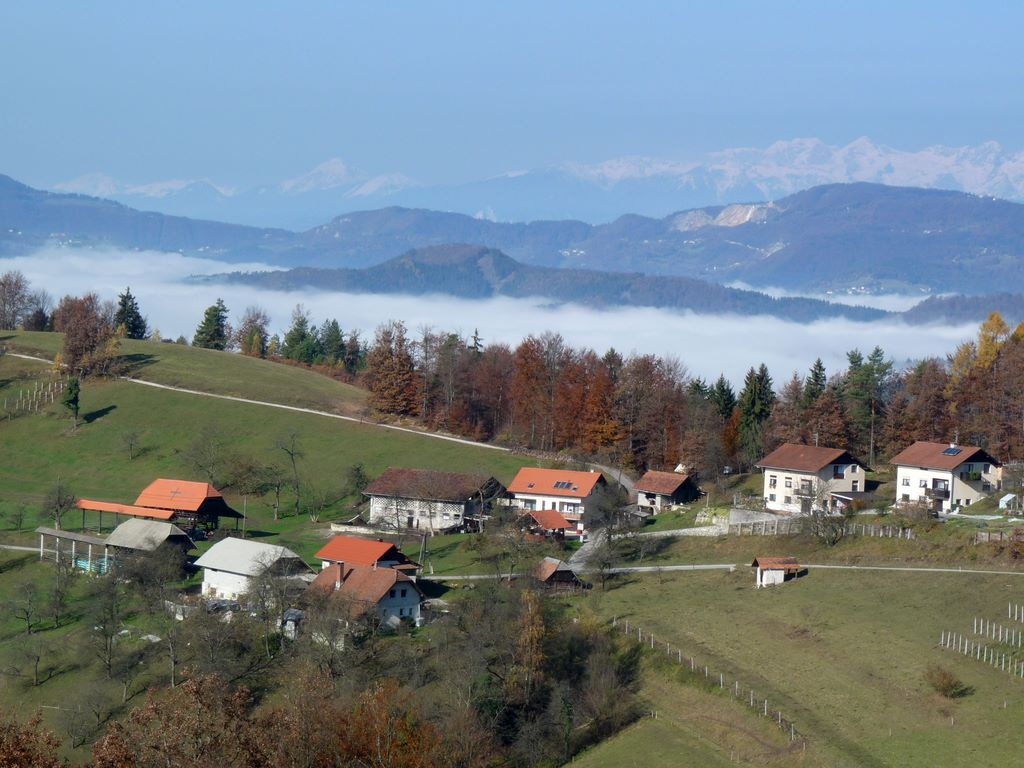
- The hamlet of Bič in Liberga

- Location in Slovenia
- Coordinates: 46°1′22.43″N 14°53′58.69″E
- Country: Slovenia
- Traditional region: Lower Carniola
- Statistical region: Central Slovenia
- Municipality: Šmartno pri Litiji

Area
  - Total: 3.21 km^{2} (1.24 sq mi)
- Elevation: 506.1 m (1,660 ft)

Population (2002)
  - Total: 54

Liberga (pronounced [ˈliːbɛɾɡa]) is a small village in the Municipality of Šmartno pri Litiji in central Slovenia. It lies in the Sava Hills (Slovene: Posavsko hribovje) east of Velika Kostrevnica. The area is part of the historical region of Lower Carniola. The municipality is now included in the Central Slovenia Statistical Region.
