= Javorje, Šmartno pri Litiji =

Javorje
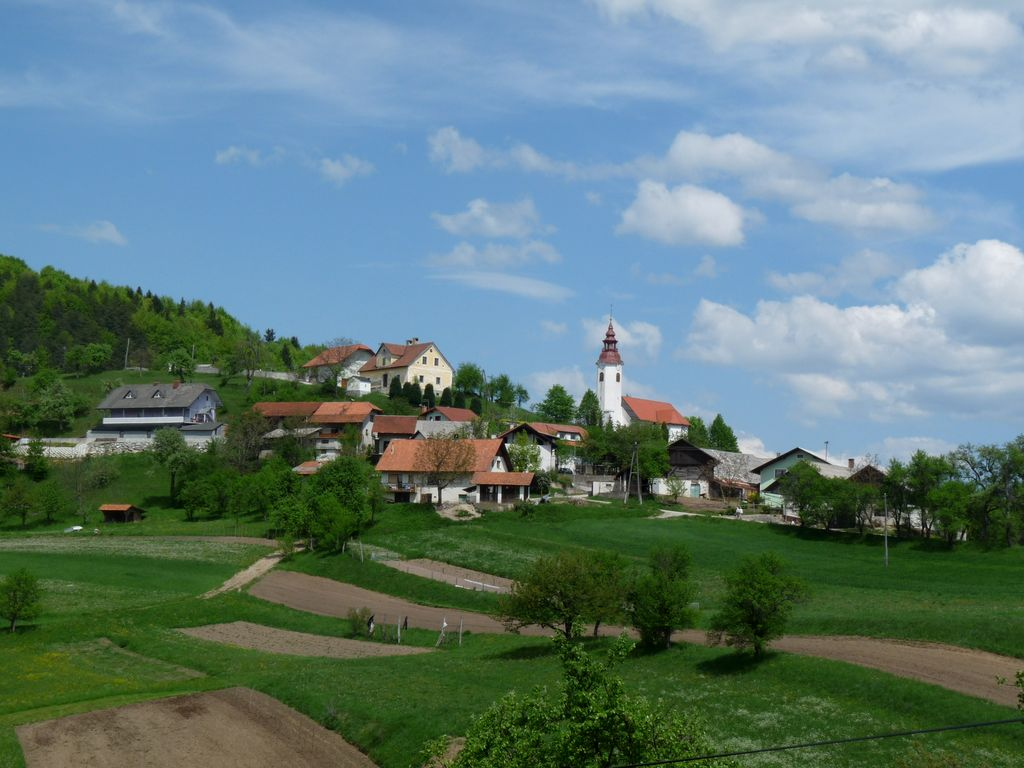

- Location in Slovenia
- Coordinates: 46°0′9.98″N 14°50′39.42″E
- Country: Slovenia
- Traditional region: Lower Carniola
- Statistical region: Central Slovenia
- Municipality: Šmartno pri Litiji

Area
  - Total: 3.34 km^{2} (1.29 sq mi)
- Elevation: 555.1 m (1,821 ft)

Population (2002)
  - Total: 56

Javorje (pronounced [ˈjaːʋɔɾjɛ]) is a village in the hills south of Šmartno pri Litiji in central Slovenia. The area is part of the historical region of Lower Carniola. The Municipality of Šmartno pri Litiji is now included in the Central Slovenia Statistical Region. It includes the hamlet of Felič Vrh (in older sources also Velič Vrh, German: Feldberg).

== Churches ==
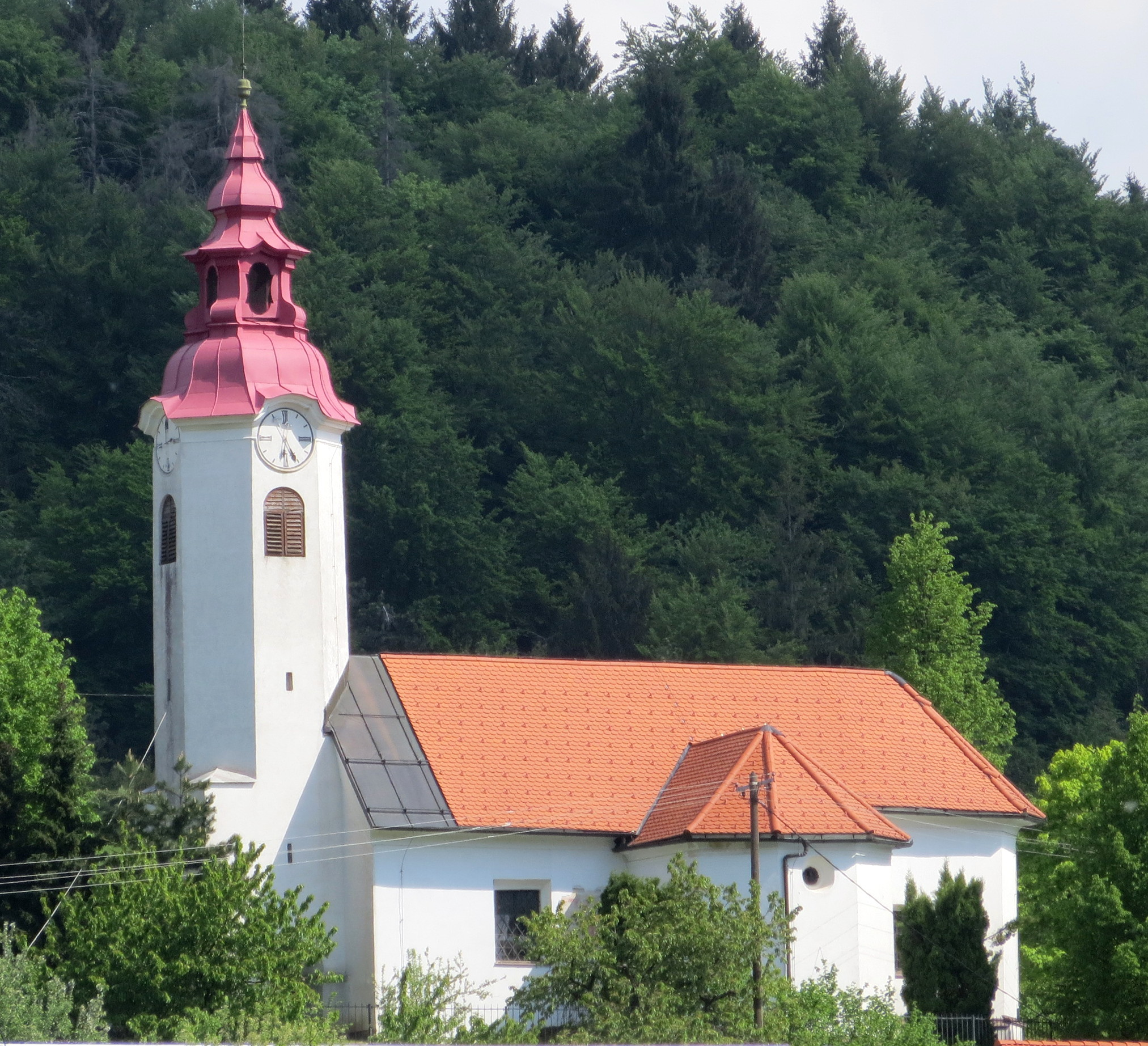
Assumption Church

The parish church in the settlement is dedicated to the Assumption of Mary and belongs to the Roman Catholic Archdiocese of Ljubljana. It dates to the 18th century.

Another church in Javorje stood in the hamlet of Felič Vrh southeast of the main settlement. It was dedicated to Saint Roch after the plague of 1646 and was destroyed between May 18 and May 20, 1942 in order to clear the border area between German and Italian territory. A new church dedicated to Saint Roch was consecrated at the site on August 28, 2011.
