= Cerovica, Šmartno pri Litiji =

Cerovica
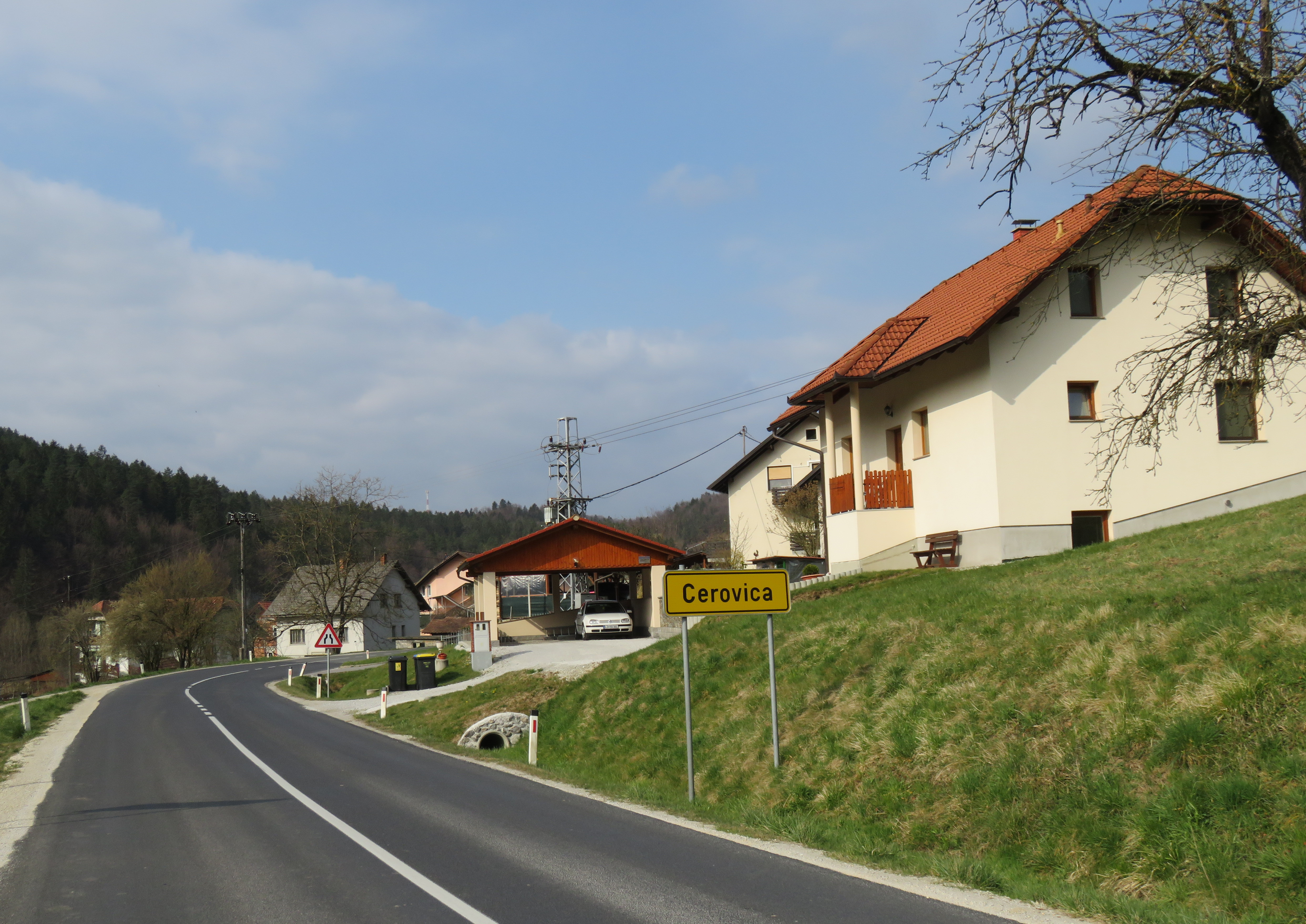

- Location in Slovenia
- Coordinates: 46°2′14.56″N 14°53′30.7″E
- Country: Slovenia
- Traditional region: Lower Carniola
- Statistical region: Central Slovenia
- Municipality: Šmartno pri Litiji

Area
  - Total: 0.99 km^{2} (0.38 sq mi)
- Elevation: 317.4 m (1,041 ft)

Population (2002)
  - Total: 140

Cerovica (pronounced [tsɛˈɾɔːʋitsa]) is a settlement in the Municipality of Šmartno pri Litiji in central Slovenia. It lies east of Šmartno on the regional road to Mirna. The area is part of the historical region of Lower Carniola. The municipality is now included in the Central Slovenia Statistical Region.

== Name ==
Cerovica was attested in historical sources as Corowitz in 1343.
