= Jablaniški Potok =

- Location in Slovenia
- Coordinates: 46°3′1.24″N 14°54′11.54″E
- Country: Slovenia
- Traditional region: Lower Carniola
- Statistical region: Central Slovenia
- Municipality: Šmartno pri Litiji

Area
  - Total: 0.67 km^{2} (0.26 sq mi)
- Elevation: 378.8 m (1,243 ft)

Population (2002)
  - Total: 5

Jablaniški Potok (pronounced [ˈjaːblaniʃki ˈpɔːtɔk]) is a small settlement at the source and upper course of Jablanica Creek (Slovene: Jablaniški potok) in the hills east of Šmartno pri Litiji in central Slovenia. The area is part of the historical region of Lower Carniola. The Municipality of Šmartno pri Litiji is included in the Central Slovenia Statistical Region.
