= Jablaniške Laze =

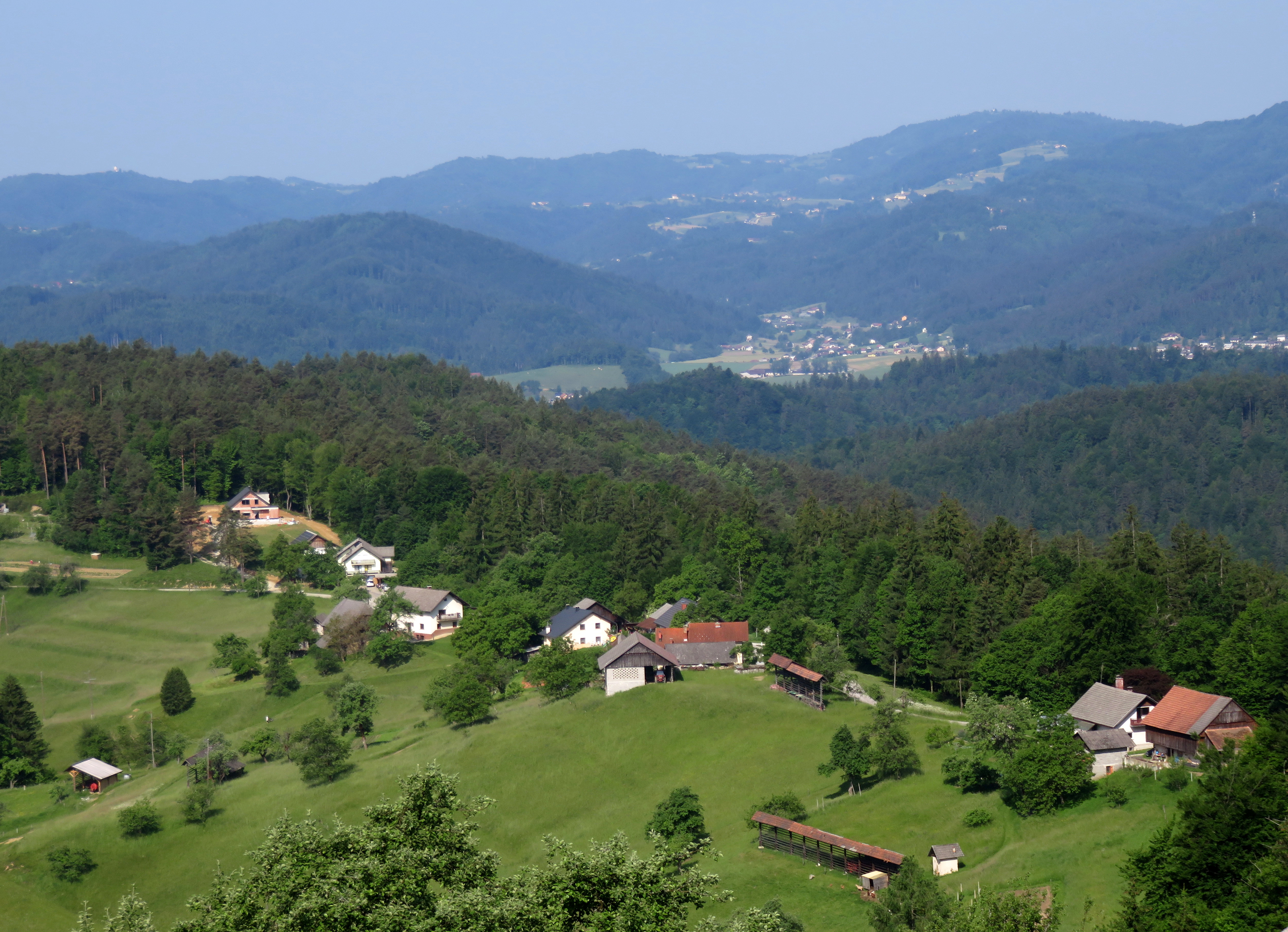

- Location in Slovenia
- Coordinates: 46°2′29.82″N 14°54′15.32″E
- Country: Slovenia
- Traditional region: Lower Carniola
- Statistical region: Central Slovenia
- Municipality: Šmartno pri Litiji

Area
  - Total: 2.41 km^{2} (0.93 sq mi)
- Elevation: 455.3 m (1,494 ft)

Population (2002)
  - Total: 63

Jablaniške Laze (pronounced [ˈjaːblaniʃkɛ ˈlaːzɛ]) is a dispersed settlement in the hills east of Šmartno pri Litiji in the historical region of Lower Carniola in Slovenia. The municipality is included in the Central Slovenia Statistical Region.
