= Razbore, Šmartno pri Litiji =

Razbore
- Location in Slovenia
- Coordinates: 46°0′30.28″N 14°53′52.74″E
- Country: Slovenia
- Traditional region: Lower Carniola
- Statistical region: Central Slovenia
- Municipality: Šmartno pri Litiji

Area
  - Total: 0.38 km^{2} (0.15 sq mi)
- Elevation: 470 m (1,540 ft)

Population (2002)
  - Total: 26

Razbore (pronounced [ɾaˈzboːɾɛ]) is a small settlement in the Municipality of Šmartno pri Litiji in central Slovenia. It lies along the local road from Velika Kostrevnica towards Ježni Vrh in the hills southeast of Šmartno. The area is part of the historical region of Lower Carniola. The municipality is now included in the Central Slovenia Statistical Region.
