= Municipality of Šmartno pri Litiji =

Municipality of Slovenia

Municipality of Šmartno pri Litiji Občina Šmartno pri Litiji
- Municipality
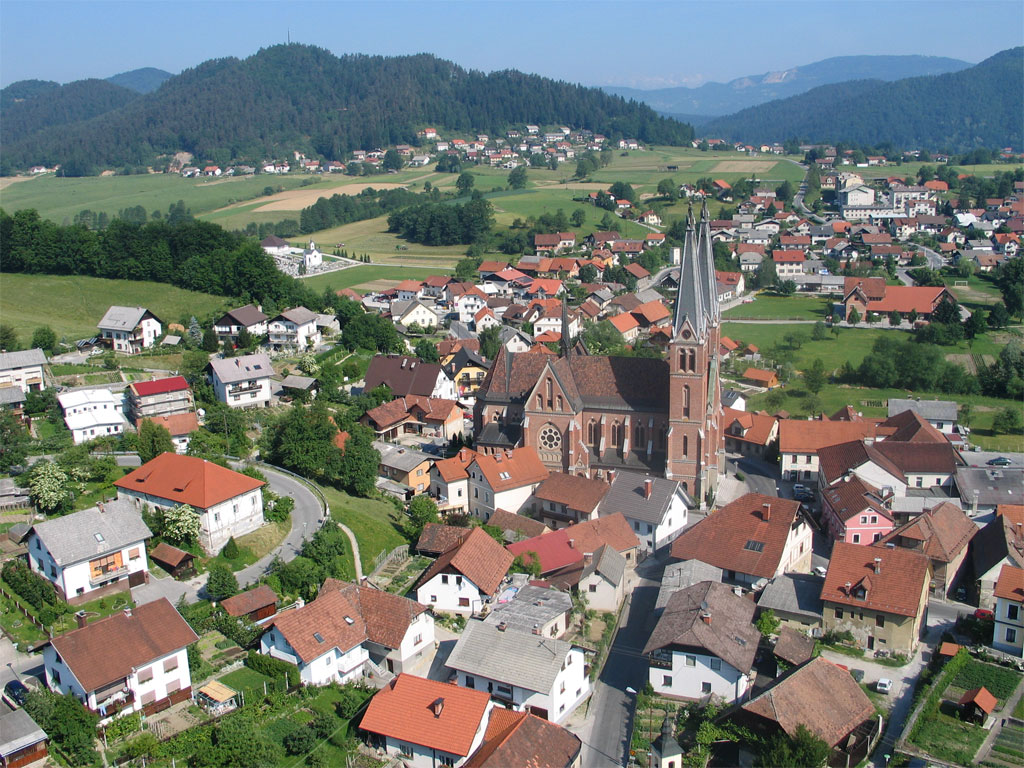

- Location of the Municipality of Šmartno pri Litiji in Slovenia
- Coordinates: 46°01′45″N 14°50′25″E
- Country: Slovenia

Government
  - Mayor: Rajko Meserko

Area
  - Total: 94.9 km^{2} (36.6 sq mi)

Population (2017)
  - Total: 5,545
  - Density: 58.4/km^{2} (151/sq mi)
- Time zone: UTC+01 (CET)
  - Summer (DST): UTC+02 (CEST)
- Website: smartno-litija.si

The Municipality of Šmartno pri Litiji (pronounced [ˈʃmaːɾtnɔ pɾi liˈtiːji]; Slovene: Občina Šmartno pri Litiji) is a municipality in the traditional region of Lower Carniola in southeastern Slovenia. The seat of the municipality is the town of Šmartno pri Litiji. The municipality is now included in the Central Slovenia Statistical Region.

== Settlements ==
In addition to the municipal seat of Šmartno pri Litiji, the municipality also includes the following settlements:

- Bogenšperk
- Bukovica pri Litiji
- Cerovica
- Črni Potok
- Dolnji Vrh
- Dragovšek
- Dvor
- Gornji Vrh
- Gozd–Reka
- Gradišče
- Gradišče pri Litiji
- Gradiške Laze
- Jablaniške Laze
- Jablaniški Potok
- Jastrebnik
- Javorje
- Jelša
- Ježce
- Ježni Vrh
- Kamni Vrh pri Primskovem
- Koške Poljane
- Leskovica pri Šmartnem
- Liberga
- Lupinica
- Mala Kostrevnica
- Mala Štanga
- Mihelca
- Mišji Dol
- Mulhe
- Obla Gorica
- Podroje
- Poljane pri Primskovem
- Preska nad Kostrevnico
- Primskovo
- Račica
- Razbore
- Riharjevec
- Ščit
- Selšek
- Sevno
- Spodnja Jablanica
- Štangarske Poljane
- Stara Gora pri Velikem Gabru
- Velika Kostrevnica
- Velika Štanga
- Vinji Vrh
- Vintarjevec
- Višnji Grm
- Volčja Jama
- Vrata
- Zagrič
- Zavrstnik
- Zgornja Jablanica
