= Zgornja Jablanica =

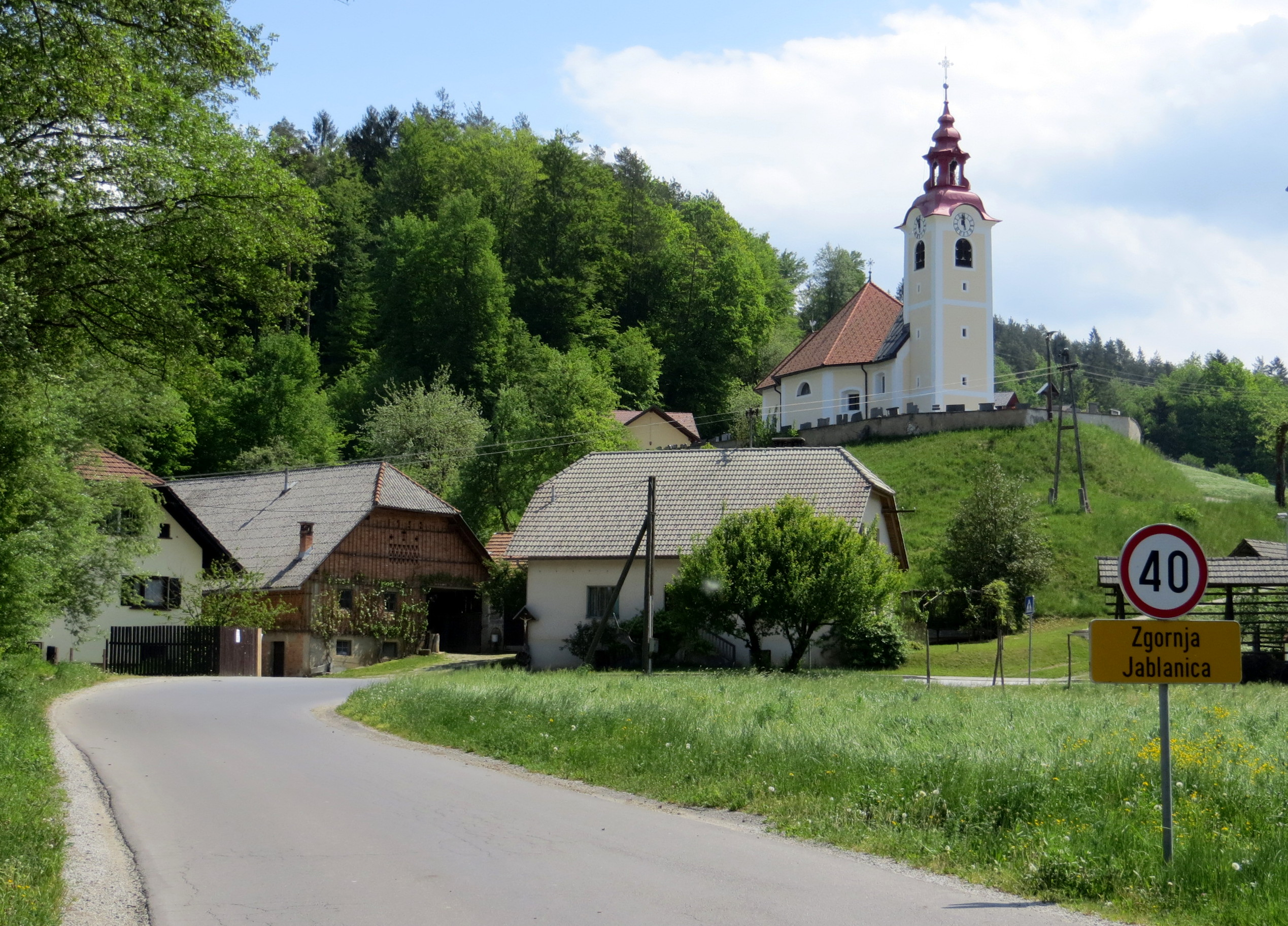

- Location in Slovenia
- Coordinates: 46°2′32.31″N 14°52′23.22″E
- Country: Slovenia
- Traditional region: Lower Carniola
- Statistical region: Central Slovenia
- Municipality: Šmartno pri Litiji

Area
  - Total: 1.44 km^{2} (0.56 sq mi)
- Elevation: 283.1 m (929 ft)

Population (2002)
  - Total: 96

Zgornja Jablanica (pronounced [ˈzɡoːɾnja ˈjaːblanitsa]; in older sources also Gorenja Jablanica, German: Oberjablanitz) is a village in the Municipality of Šmartno pri Litiji in central Slovenia. The area is part of the historical region of Lower Carniola. The municipality is now included in the Central Slovenia Statistical Region.

== Church ==
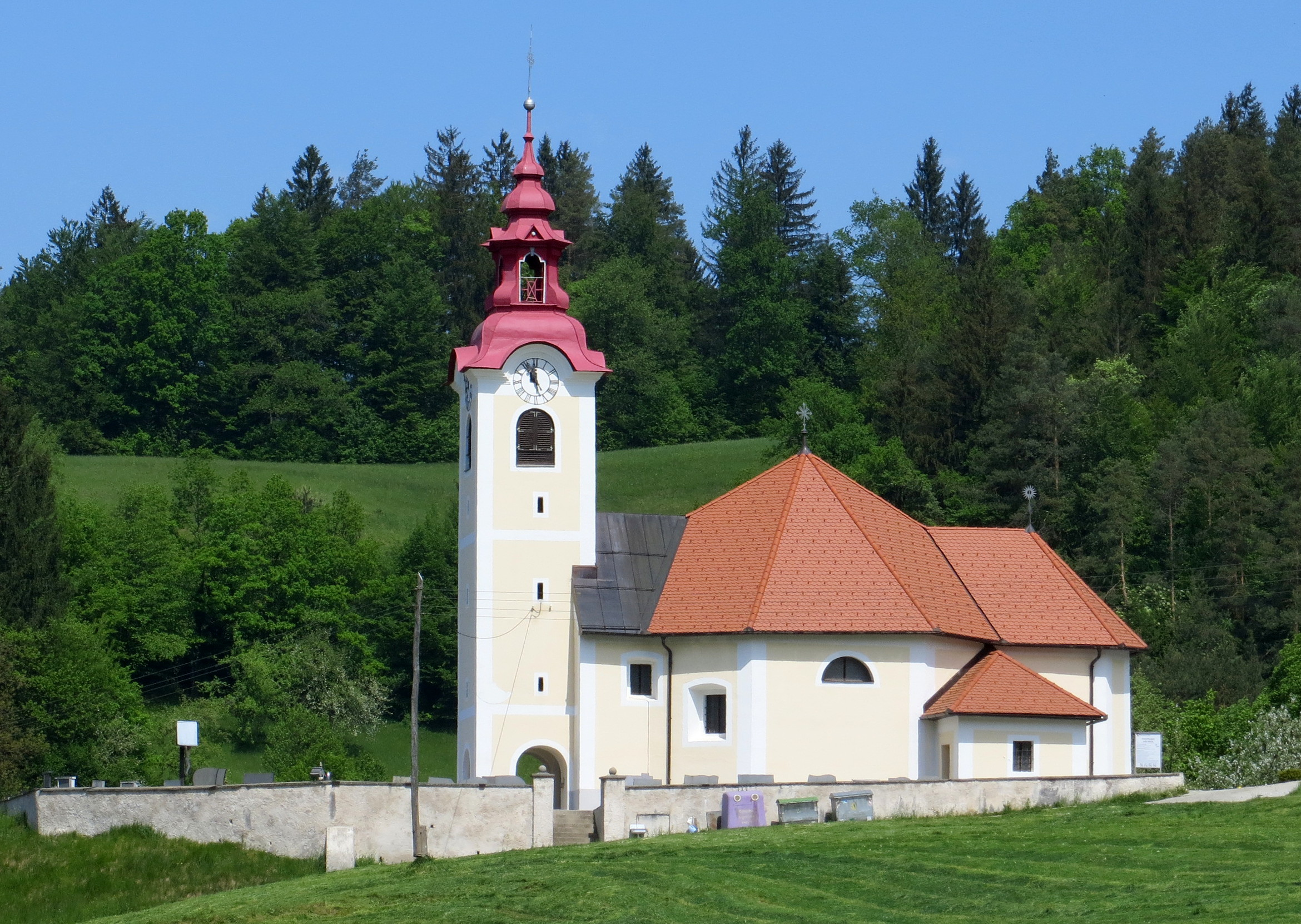
Saint Anne's Church

The local church, built on a small hill southwest of the settlement core, is dedicated to Saint Anne and belongs to the Parish of Šmartno. It is a Baroque church built in the third quarter of the 18th century.
