= Vintarjevec =

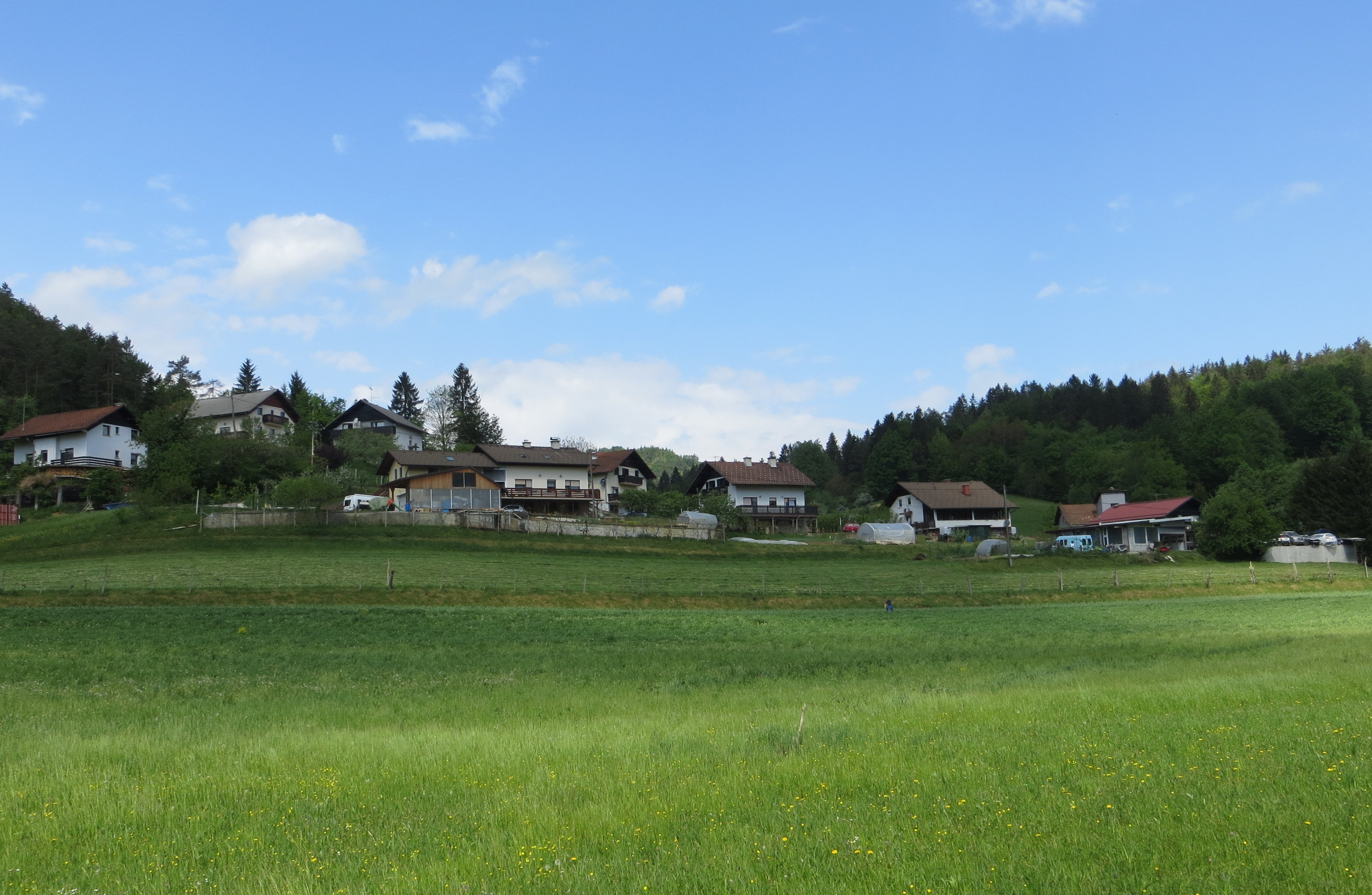

- Location in Slovenia
- Coordinates: 46°0′59.11″N 14°49′29.08″E
- Country: Slovenia
- Traditional region: Lower Carniola
- Statistical region: Central Slovenia
- Municipality: Šmartno pri Litiji

Area
  - Total: 4.12 km^{2} (1.59 sq mi)
- Elevation: 358.2 m (1,175 ft)

Population (2002)
  - Total: 150

Vintarjevec (pronounced [ˈʋiːntaɾjɛʋəts]; German: Sankt Peter und Paul) is a village in the Municipality of Šmartno pri Litiji in central Slovenia. The area is part of the historical region of Lower Carniola. The municipality is now included in the Central Slovenia Statistical Region.

== Church ==
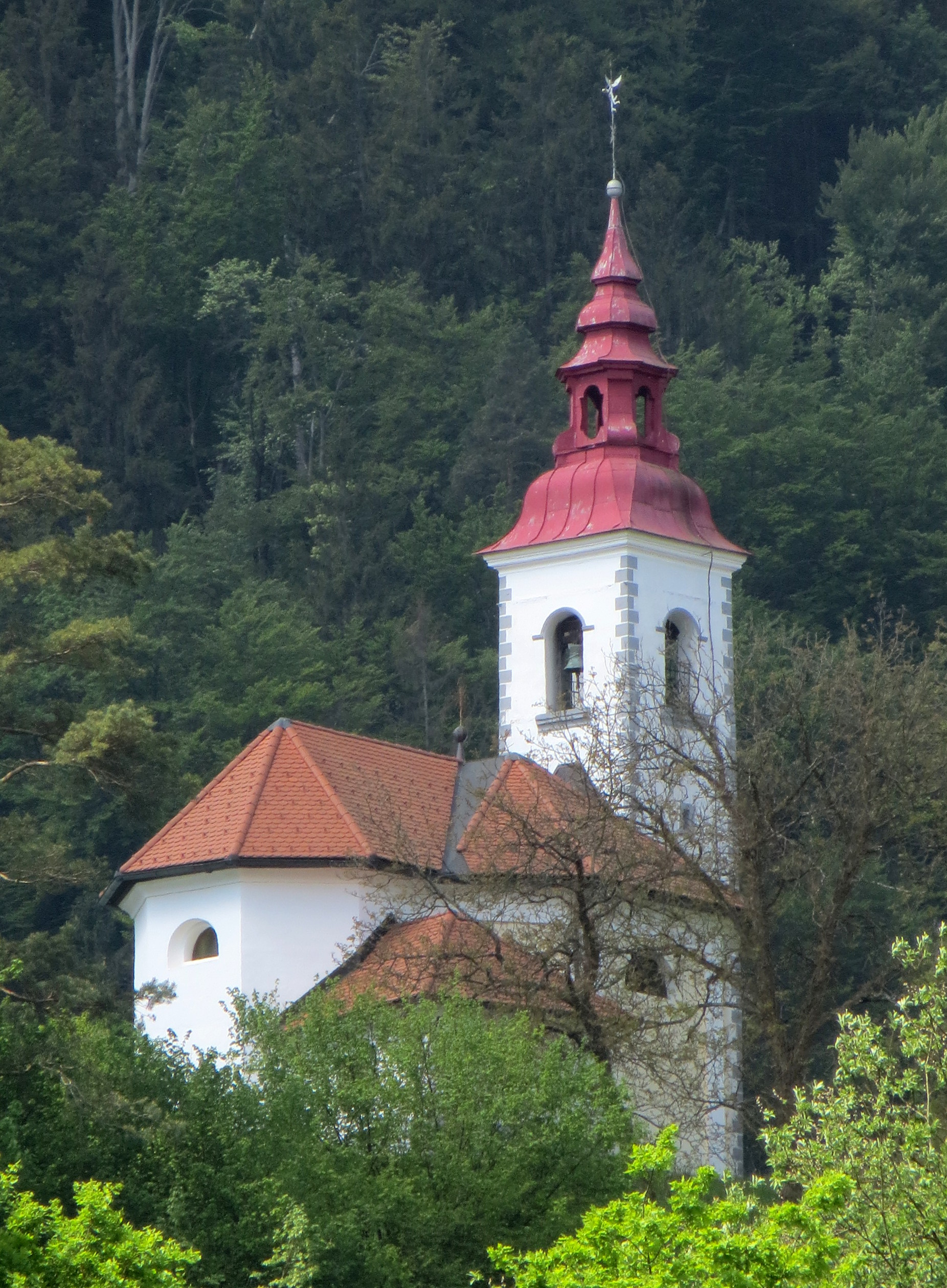
Saint Peter's Church

The local church is dedicated to Saint Peter and belongs to the Parish of Šmartno. It dates to the 17th century with an 18th-century extension. The high altar dates to 1904 with the original 17th-century main altar now used as a side altar.
