= Dvor, Šmartno pri Litiji =

Dvor
- Location in Slovenia
- Coordinates: 46°1′23.61″N 14°52′3.38″E
- Country: Slovenia
- Traditional region: Lower Carniola
- Statistical region: Central Slovenia
- Municipality: Šmartno pri Litiji

Area
  - Total: 2.26 km^{2} (0.87 sq mi)
- Elevation: 291.8 m (957 ft)

Dvor (pronounced [ˈdʋɔɾ]) is a settlement in the Municipality of Šmartno pri Litiji in central Slovenia. The area is part of the historical region of Lower Carniola. The municipality is now included in the Central Slovenia Statistical Region.

== Name ==
The name of the settlement was changed from Dvor to Dvor pri Bogenšperku in 1953. In 1995 the settlement of Dvor pri Bogenšperku was split into two new settlements: Dvor and Bogenšperk.

== Lihtenberk Castle ==
Lihtenberk Castle, now a ruin, first mentioned in written documents dating to 1250, badly damaged in the 1511 Idrija earthquake, and finally demolished in the early 17th century, was located near the settlement.
