= Štangarske Poljane =

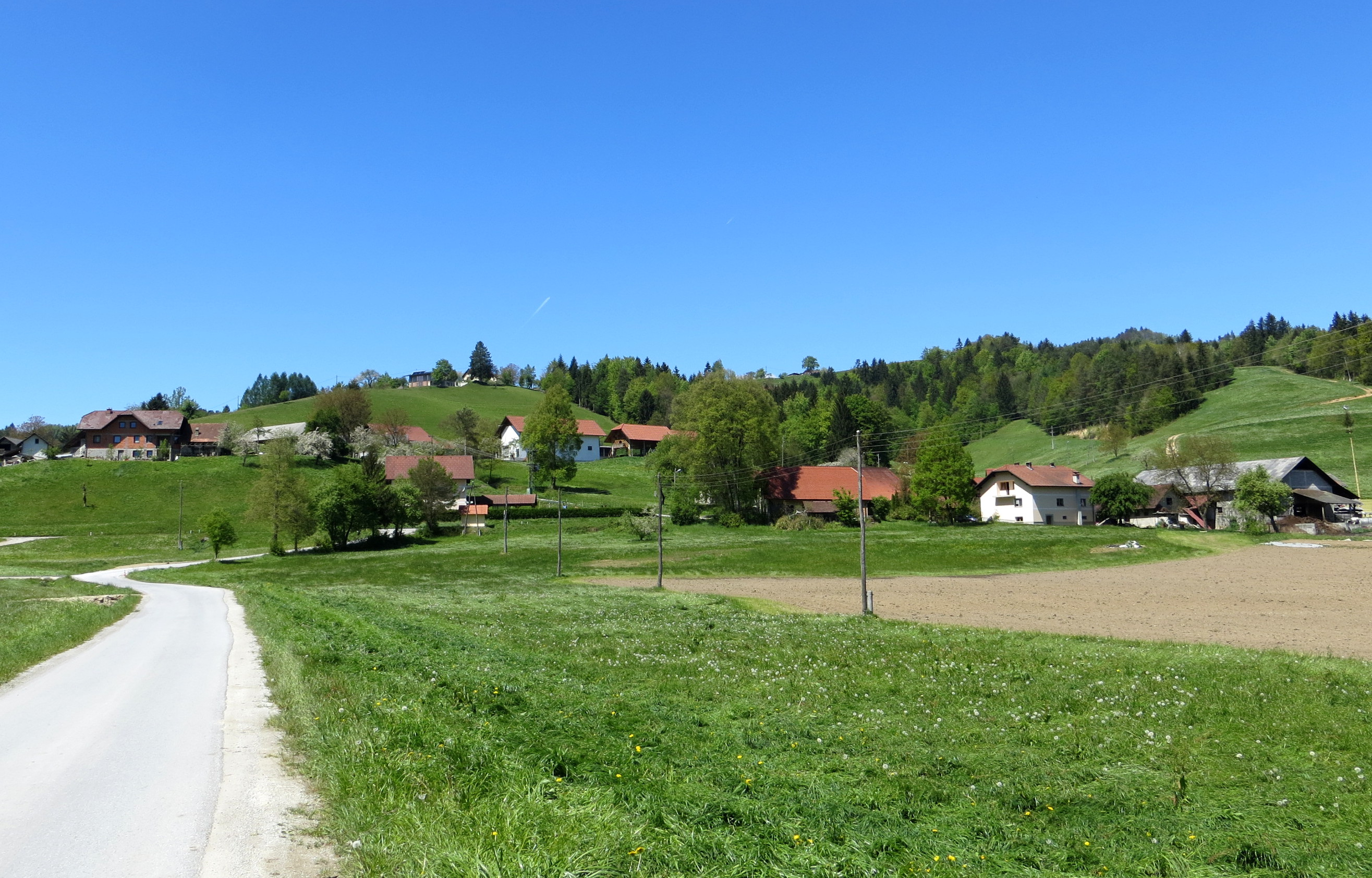

- Location in Slovenia
- Coordinates: 46°2′16.65″N 14°47′28.37″E
- Country: Slovenia
- Traditional region: Lower Carniola
- Statistical region: Central Slovenia
- Municipality: Šmartno pri Litiji

Area
  - Total: 0.89 km^{2} (0.34 sq mi)
- Elevation: 304.5 m (999 ft)

Population (2002)
  - Total: 74

Štangarske Poljane (pronounced [ˈʃtaːŋɡaɾskɛ pɔˈljaːnɛ]; German: Stangenpolane) is a small settlement in the Municipality of Šmartno pri Litiji in central Slovenia. It lies in the valley of Reka Creek in the hills west of Šmartno. The municipality is now included in the Central Slovenia Statistical Region. The area is part of the traditional region of Lower Carniola.
