= Spodnja Jablanica =

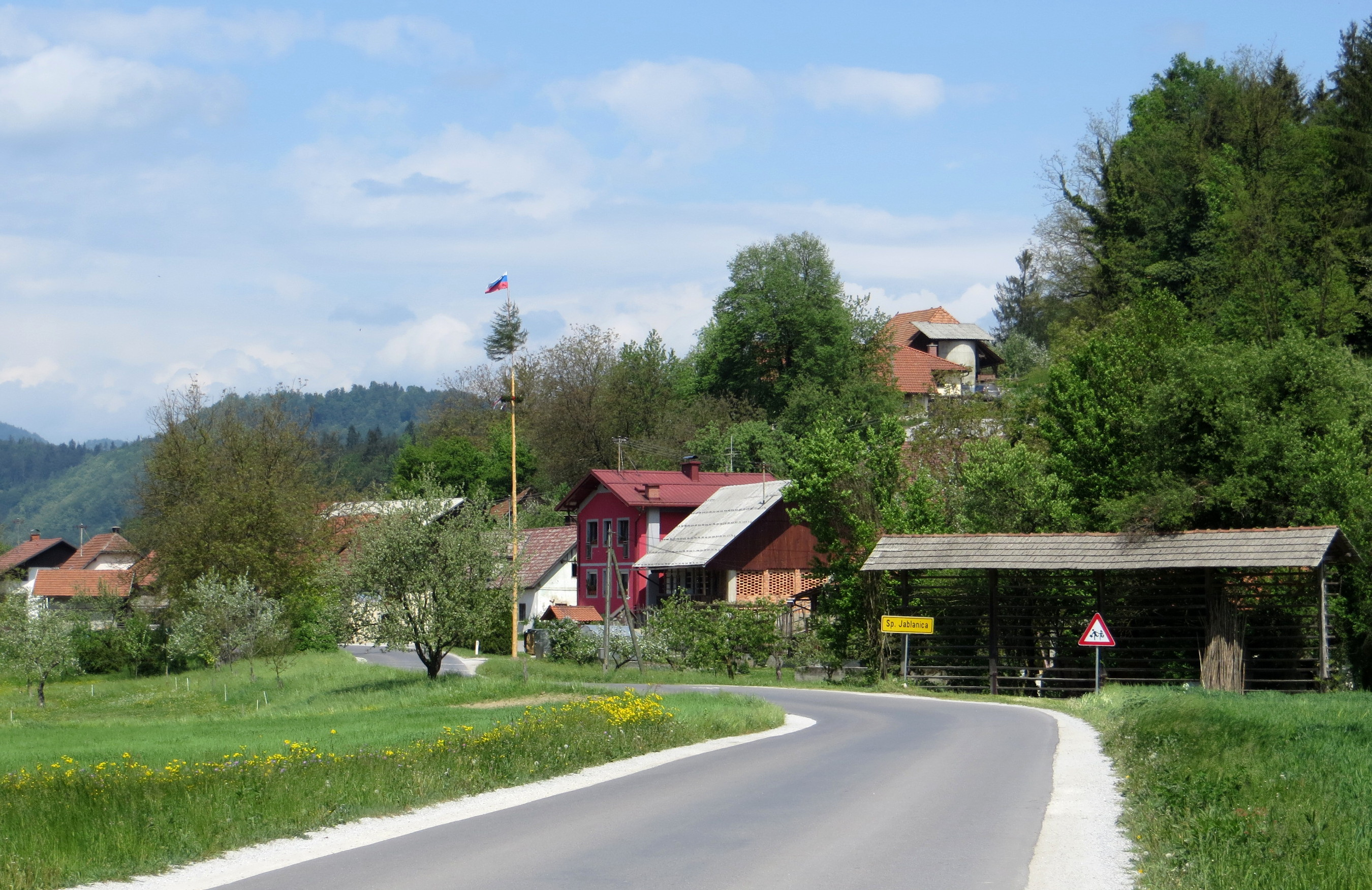

- Location in Slovenia
- Coordinates: 46°2′41.68″N 14°52′4.12″E
- Country: Slovenia
- Traditional region: Lower Carniola
- Statistical region: Central Slovenia
- Municipality: Šmartno pri Litiji

Area
  - Total: 0.6 km^{2} (0.23 sq mi)
- Elevation: 276.7 m (908 ft)

Population (2002)
  - Total: 60

Spodnja Jablanica (pronounced [ˈspoːdnja ˈjaːblanitsa]; in older sources also Dolenja Jablanica, German: Unterjablanitz) is a settlement in the Municipality of Šmartno pri Litiji in central Slovenia. It lies east of Šmartno in the valley of Jablanica Creek (Slovene: Jablaniški potok). The area is part of the historical region of Lower Carniola. The municipality is now included in the Central Slovenia Statistical Region.
