= Volčja Jama, Šmartno pri Litiji =

Volčja Jama
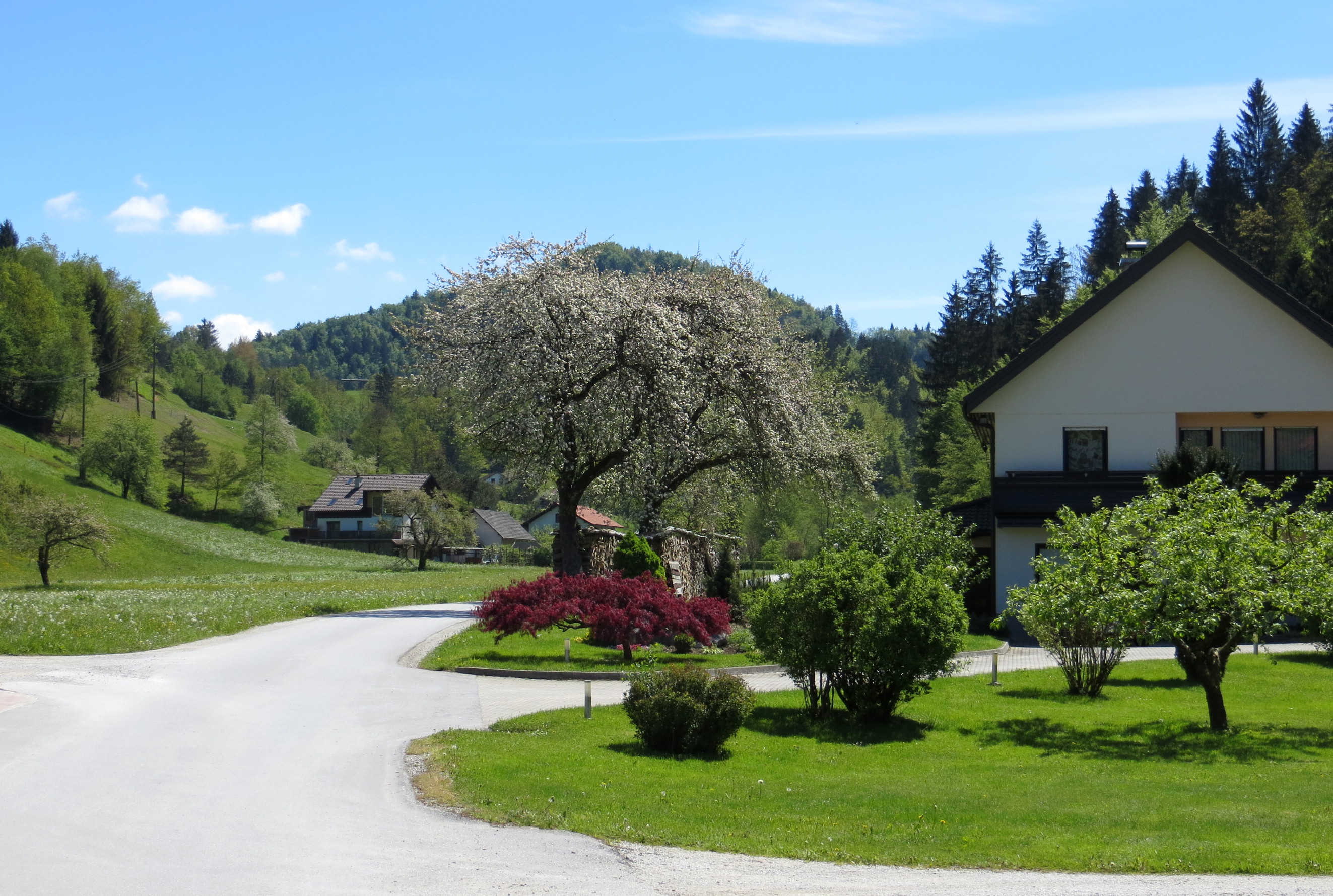

- Location in Slovenia
- Coordinates: 46°1′54.03″N 14°47′58.22″E
- Country: Slovenia
- Traditional region: Lower Carniola
- Statistical region: Central Slovenia
- Municipality: Šmartno pri Litiji

Area
  - Total: 2.9 km^{2} (1.1 sq mi)
- Elevation: 300.3 m (985 ft)

Population (2002)
  - Total: 91

Volčja Jama (pronounced [ˈʋoːu̯tʃja ˈjaːma]; German: Wolfsgruben) is a dispersed settlement in the hills west of Šmartno pri Litiji in central Slovenia. The area is part of the historical region of Lower Carniola. The Municipality of Šmartno pri Litiji is now included in the Central Slovenia Statistical Region.

== Name ==
The name Volčja Jama literally means 'wolf cave/pit'. The first part of the name is derived from the Slovene adjective volčji (literally, 'wolf'), which may refer to the animal (< volk 'wolf') or to the related Slavic personal name *Vьlkъ. The second part of the name is from the common noun jama 'cave, pit', referring to a geographical feature.
