= Bogenšperk, Šmartno pri Litiji =

Bogenšperk
- Location in Slovenia
- Coordinates: 46°1′23.08″N 14°51′21.3″E
- Country: Slovenia
- Traditional region: Lower Carniola
- Statistical region: Central Slovenia
- Municipality: Šmartno pri Litiji

Area
  - Total: 1.21 km^{2} (0.47 sq mi)
- Elevation: 422.5 m (1,386 ft)

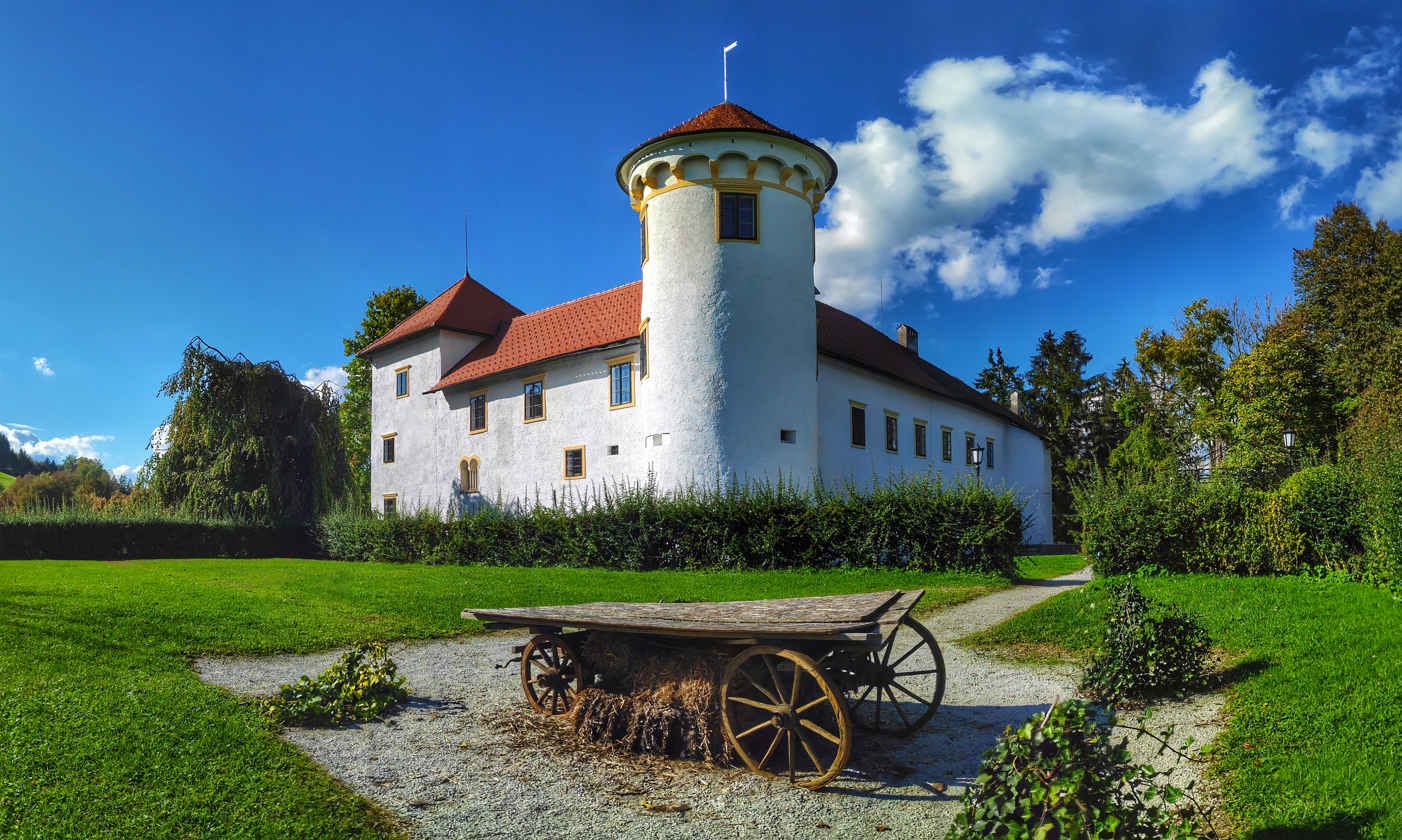
Bogenšperk Castle

Bogenšperk (pronounced [ˈboːɡɛnʃpɛɾk]; German: Wagensberg) is a small settlement in the Municipality of Šmartno pri Litiji in central Slovenia. The area is part of the historical region of Lower Carniola. The municipality is now included in the Central Slovenia Statistical Region. The settlement was formally created in 1995, when the settlement of Dvor pri Bogenšperku was split into two new settlements: Dvor and Bogenšperk.

It is best known as the location of Bogenšperk Castle.
