= Mala Štanga =

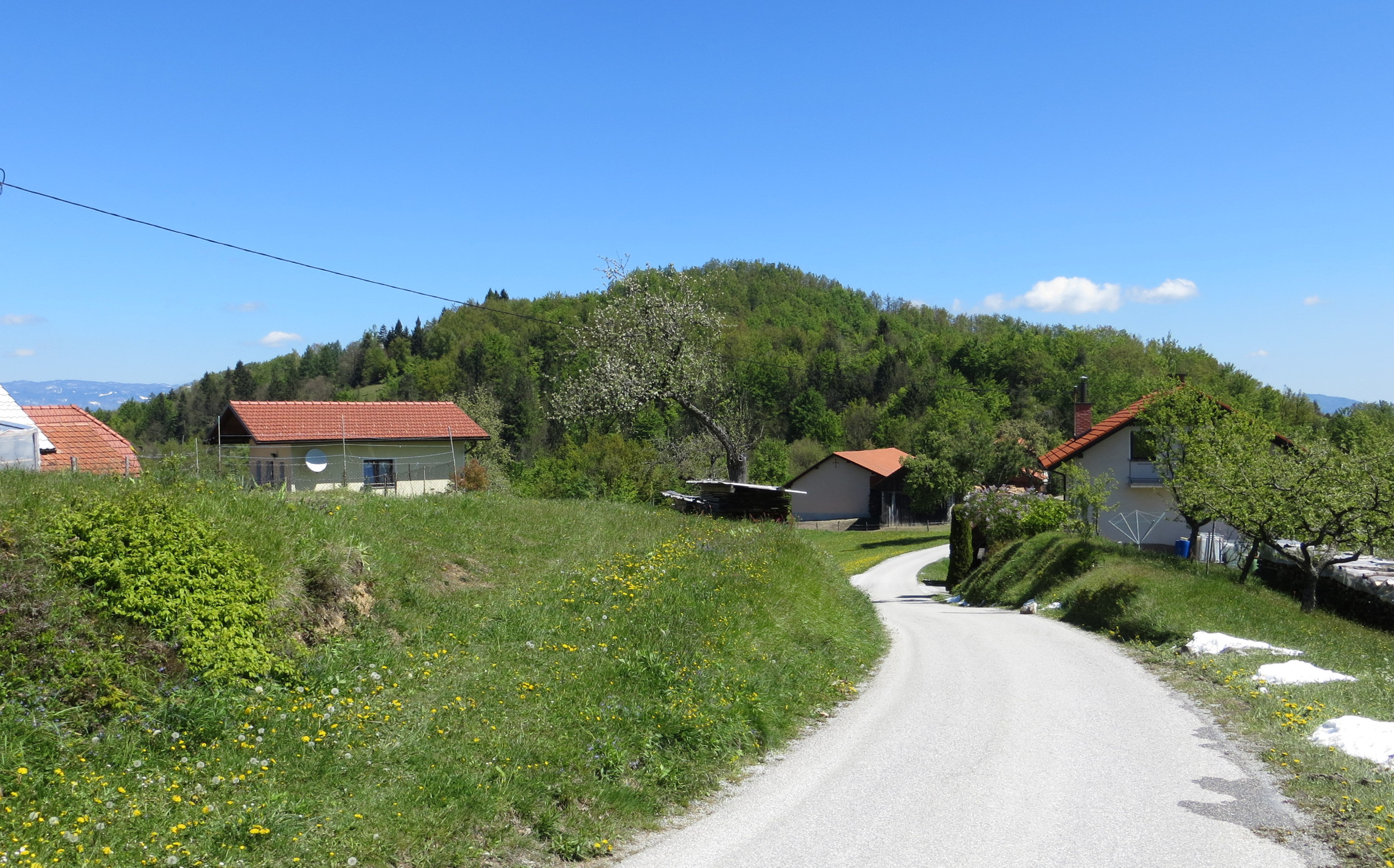

- Location in Slovenia
- Coordinates: 46°3′35.75″N 14°45′14.08″E
- Country: Slovenia
- Traditional region: Lower Carniola
- Statistical region: Central Slovenia
- Municipality: Šmartno pri Litiji

Area
  - Total: 1.81 km^{2} (0.70 sq mi)
- Elevation: 529.1 m (1,736 ft)

Population (2002)
  - Total: 26

Mala Štanga (pronounced [ˈmaːla ˈʃtaːŋɡa]; German: Stangenwald, Stangen) is a small dispersed settlement in the Municipality of Šmartno pri Litiji in central Slovenia. It lies in the Sava Hills (Slovene: Posavsko hribovje) west of Litija. The area is part of the historical region of Lower Carniola. The municipality is now included in the Central Slovenia Statistical Region.

An Early Iron Age hillfort has been identified on a hill to the east of the settlement, although the usual associated burial ground has yet to be found.
