= Ježni Vrh =

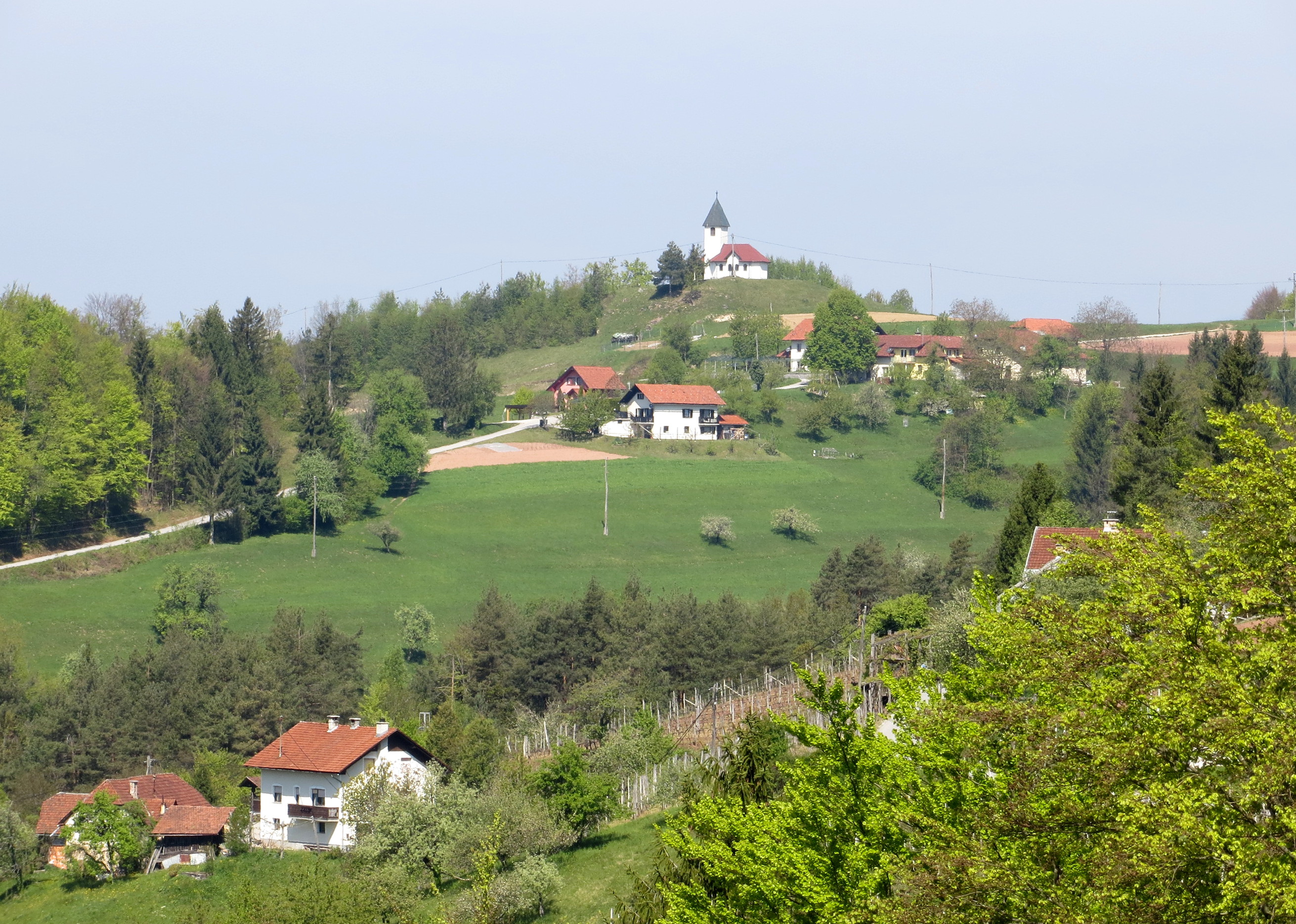

- Location in Slovenia
- Coordinates: 46°0′22.24″N 14°54′29.06″E
- Country: Slovenia
- Traditional region: Lower Carniola
- Statistical region: Central Slovenia
- Municipality: Šmartno pri Litiji

Area
  - Total: 0.41 km^{2} (0.16 sq mi)
- Elevation: 543.6 m (1,783 ft)

Population (2002)
  - Total: 21

Ježni Vrh (pronounced [ˈjeːʒni ˈʋəɾx]; in older sources also Ješenji Vrh, German: Jeschenberg) is a small settlement in the hills southeast of Velika Kostrevnica in the Municipality of Šmartno pri Litiji in central Slovenia. The area is part of the historical region of Lower Carniola and is included in the Central Slovenia Statistical Region.

== Name ==
Ježni Vrh was attested in historical sources as monte ferreo and Eisenberg in 1316, Eysenperg in 1420, and Essenperg in 1505.

== Church ==
The church in Ježni Vrh is dedicated to Saint Peter and was completed in 1998. The church was built in gratitude by locals to commemorate the rescue of a group of 60 villagers from their Partisan captors in 1944; the villagers were tortured and led to an abandoned mine for execution, but then released. The church contains a statue of Saint Peter created by Bojan Stine. The church was consecrated by Prelate Božidar Metelko in 1999, and its third bell was blessed by Archbishop Franc Rode in 2000.
