= Preska nad Kostrevnico =

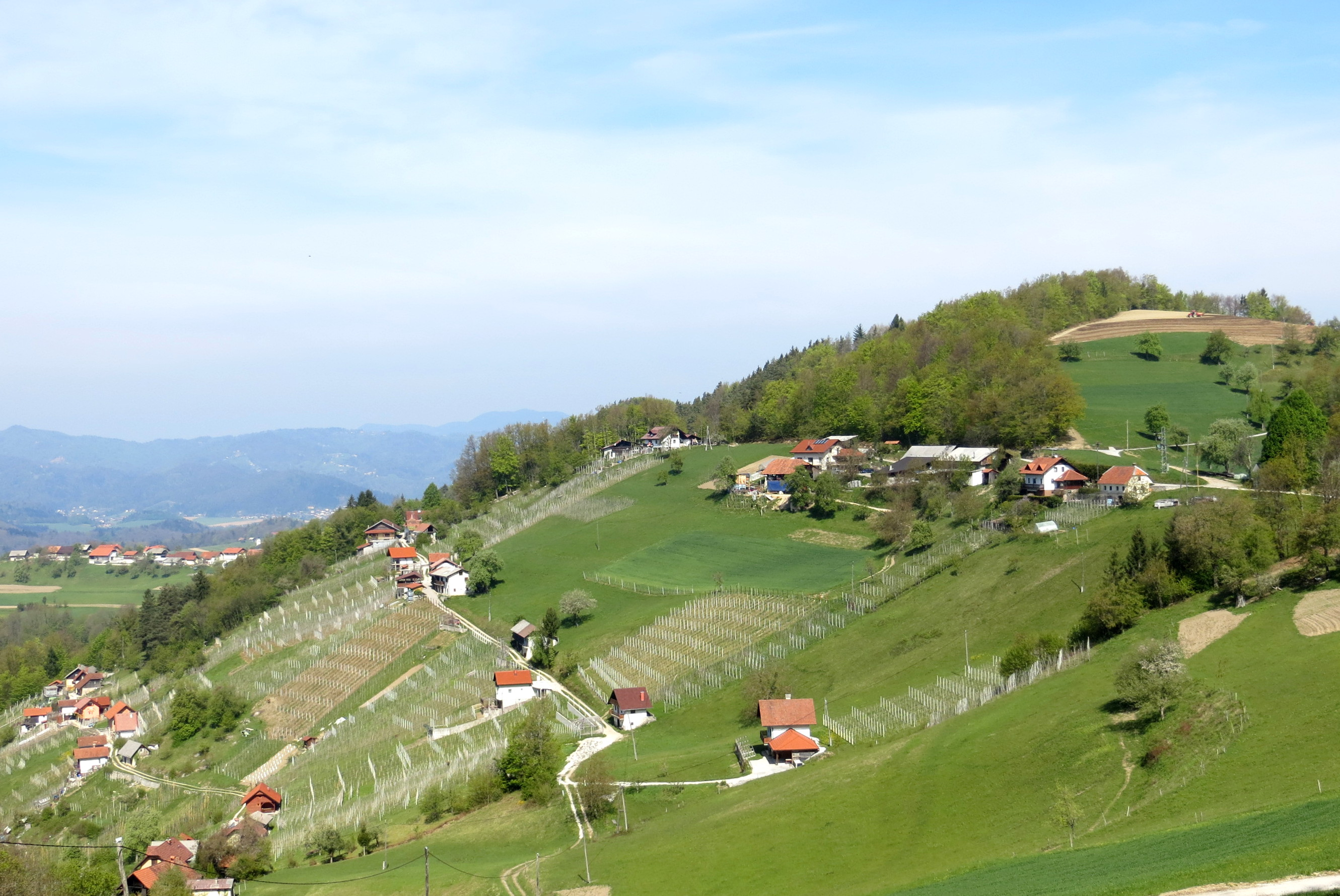

- Location in Slovenia
- Coordinates: 46°1′19.55″N 14°54′33.57″E
- Country: Slovenia
- Traditional region: Lower Carniola
- Statistical region: Central Slovenia
- Municipality: Šmartno pri Litiji

Area
  - Total: 2.55 km^{2} (0.98 sq mi)
- Elevation: 564.5 m (1,852 ft)

Population (2002)
  - Total: 90

Preska nad Kostrevnico (pronounced [ˈpɾeːska nat kɔˈstɾeːu̯nitsɔ]) is a settlement in the Municipality of Šmartno pri Litiji in central Slovenia. It lies in the hills east of Velika Kostrevnica in the historical region of Lower Carniola. The municipality is now included in the Central Slovenia Statistical Region.

== Name ==
The name of the settlement was changed from Preska to Preska nad Kostrevnico in 1955.
