= Miss Spain 2011 =

Miss Spain 2011 pageant held November, 2011

- Date: November 27, 2011
- Presenters: María José Suárez; Agustín Bravo
- Venue: El Palacio de los Sueños, Sevilla, Spain
- Broadcaster: Telecinco
- Entrants: 52
- Placements: 12
- Winner: Andrea Huisgen; Barcelona

The Miss Spain 2011 was a beauty pageant held on November 27, 2011. It was the final competition held before the organisers filed for bankruptcy in 2013, and was not televised nationally. Pageant winner Andrea Huisgen had to self-finance her trip to the Miss Universe 2012 competition.

== Background ==
There were 51 candidates competing for the national title. At the end of the competition, the winner would be selected to represent Spain at Miss Universe 2012, the first runner-up would enter Miss World 2012, and the second runner-up would be selected for Miss International 2012. The remaining finalists would be selected to participate in other beauty pageants.

== Winner ==
Andrea Huisgen, who won the pageant in 2011, was nominated the representative of Spain at Miss Universe 2012, Aránzazu Estévez Godoy classified as one of the Top 15 Finalist at Miss World, and Ana Crespo qualified for Miss International.

Huisgen, who hails from Barcelona, was elected as Miss Spain 2011 in a gala hosted in Seville, where she received the crown from 2010 winner, Paula Guilló from Teruel. At the time, Huisgen was 20 years old, was 1.80 meters tall, and had green eyes and blond hair.

== Results ==
=== Placements ===
Placement	Contestant
Miss Spain 2011	Barcelona – Andrea Huisgen
1st Runner-Up	Las Palmas – Aránzazu Estévez
2nd Runner-Up	Valencia – Ana Crespo
Top 6	Alicante – Laura Bayo; Gipuzkoa – Lidia de Sousa; Málaga – Belinda Gutiérrez
Top 12	Badajoz – Linda Aranda; Murcia – Gemma Cano; Pontevedra – Angélica González; Sevilla – Ana Araceli Jiménez; Tenerife – Judith Guerra

=== Special awards ===
- Miss Elegance - Aranzazu Estevez
- Miss Congeniality (voted by the contestants) - Clara Maria Toribio

== Contestants ==
Province	Contestant	Age	Height	Hometown
La Coruña	Estefanía Dopazo Caeiro	19	1.77	Padrón
Albacete	Ainhoa Cano Esparza	21	1.78	Totana
Alicante	Laura Isabel Bayo Vega	24	1.73	Elche
Almería	Nina López Sánchez	21	1.78	Adra
Álava	Ania Montoya Aleu	21	1.74	Vitoria-Gasteiz
Asturias	Yurie Lacruz	20	1.70	Oviedo
Ávila	Martina Mera	22	1.72	Ávila
Badajoz	Linda Aranda	25	1.77	Mérida
Barcelona	Andrea Huisgen Serrano	20	1.81	Barcelona
Vizcaya	Itziar Ramos	24	1.72	Bermeo
Burgos	Cinta del Rocío	25	1.85	Miranda de Ebro
Cáceres	María Laura Griñón	23	1.73	Trujillo
Cádiz	Carolina Calvillo Galán	24	1.74	El Puerto de Santa María
Cantabria	Inmaculada López Romero	22	1.76	Pegalajar
Castellón	Belen Jordana Moguer	23	1.75	Villarreal
Ceuta	Leonor Muñoz Cabrero	21	1.75	Úbeda
Ciudad Real	Silvia Bekri	18	1.76	Alcázar de San Juan
Córdoba	Beatriz Ortega	21	1.77	Aguilar de la Frontera
Cuenca	Rebeca Rudilla	22	1.76	Cuenca
Guipúzcoa	Lidia de Sousa	20	1.74	Vitoria-Gasteiz
Gerona	Patricia Galdon Sánchez	25	1.75	Figueres
Granada	Irina Morales	22	1.71	Motril
Guadalajara	Nidia Cerrillo	18	1.76	Azuqueca de Henares
Huelva	Elena Olmedo Jara	20	1.78	Palos de la Frontera
Huesca	Laura Pérez	25	1.77	Fraga
Baleares	Francisca Martorell Rodríguez	26	1.83	Ibiza
Jaén	Desirée Valenciano Vergara	18	1.77	Linares
La Rioja	Beatriz Delgado García	20	1.78	Calahorra
Las Palmas	Aránzazu Estévez Godoy	22	1.81	Agüimes
León	Lucía Domínguez	21	1.79	León
Lérida	Rosa María García	25	1.70	Balaguer
Lugo	Alba Mañana	22	1.77	Monforte de Lemos
Madrid	Paola Cid	21	1.79	Madrid
Málaga	Belinda Gutiérrez Tobe	23	1.78	Mijas
Melilla	Rocío Pozo Gutiérrez	18	1.72	Polígono Residencial
Murcia	Gemma Cano Esparza	18	1.78	Totana
Navarra	Ainhoa de Lera González	18	1.74	Vitoria
Orense	Marta González	27	1.72	O Barco de Valdeorras
Palencia	Patricia Méndez	25	1.73	Palencia
Pontevedra	Angélica González	25	1.80	Vigo
Salamanca	Clara Maria Toribio	21	1.82	Salamanca
Segovia	Paulina Carmen Dobek	23	1.75	Cuéllar
Sevilla	Ana Araceli Jiménez Ramírez	19	1.82	Marchena
Soria	Pilar García Santos	23	1.70	Langa de Duero
Tarragona	Valeria Doms	21	1.75	Reus
Tenerife	Judith Estela Guerra Ruiz	21	1.75	Santa Cruz de Tenerife
Teruel	Carolina Nebra	27	1.75	Alcañiz
Toledo	Africa Pérez Rojo	24	1.73	Talavera de la Reina
Valencia	Ana Crespo Martínez	20	1.76	Valencia
Valladolid	Irene Fernández	26	1.73	Valladolid
Zamora	Silvia Caballero Gago	22	1.73	Benavente
Zaragoza	María Sierra	19	1.80	Calatayud
