= Carla Barber =

Spanish doctor and model (born 1990)

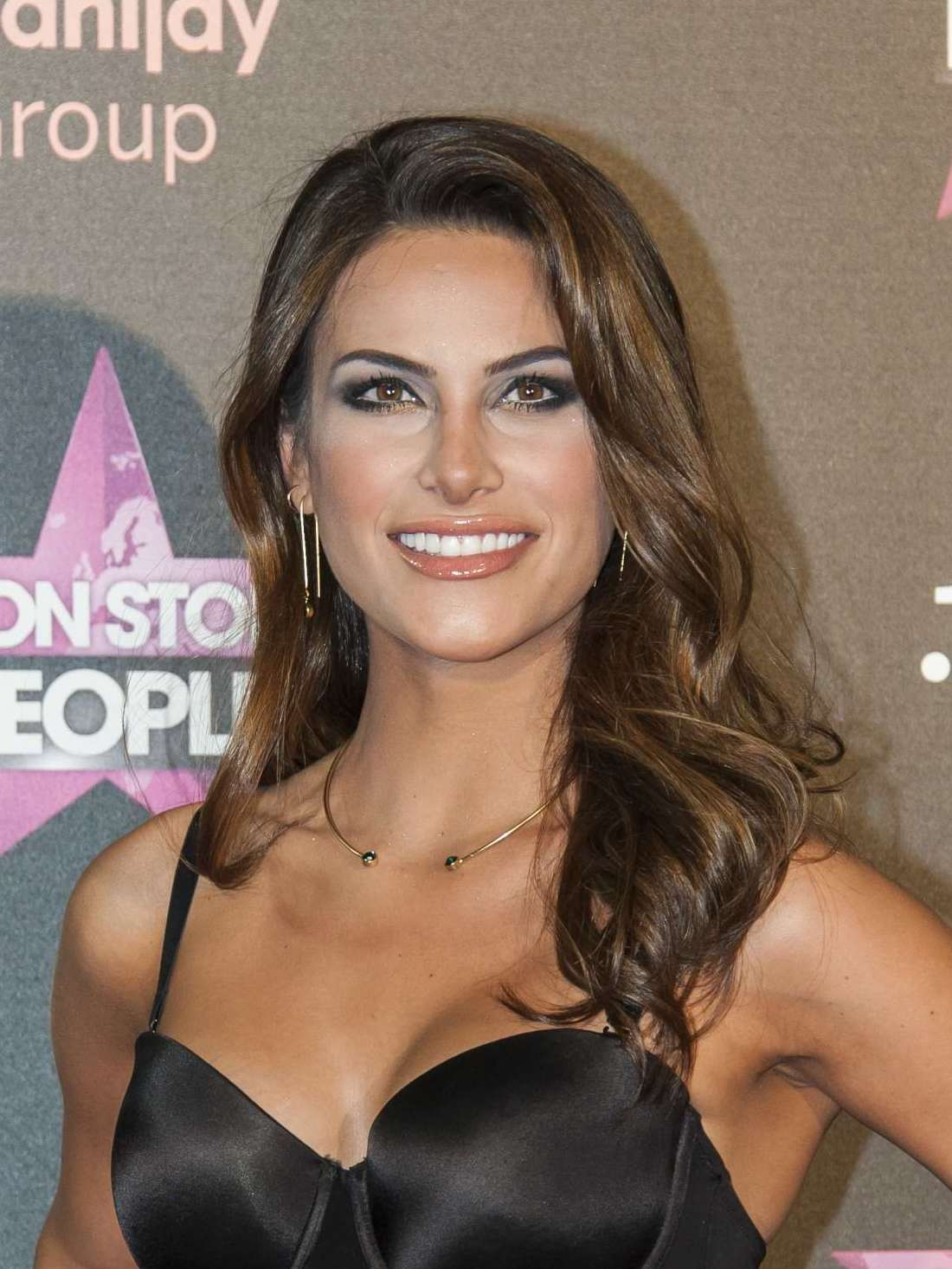
- Carla García in 2015
- Born: Carla Barber Garcia; 18 May 1990 (age 36); Las Palmas, Spain
- Height: 1.79 m (5 ft 10 1/2 in)
- Beauty pageant titleholder
- Title: Miss Universe Spain 2015; Miss World Spain 2011
- Hair color: Brown
- Eye color: Brown
- Major competitions: Miss Spain 2010 (1st runner up/Miss World Spain 2011); Miss World 2011 (Top 15); Miss Universe Spain 2015 (Winner); Miss Universe 2015 (Unplaced)

Carla Barber Garcia (born 18 May 1990) is a Spanish medical doctor, model and beauty pageant titleholder who was crowned Miss Universe Spain 2015 and Miss World Spain 2011. She represented her country at both Miss Universe 2015 and Miss World 2011.

== Medical career ==
Carla Barber obtained the bachelor's degree in Medicine at the University of Las Palmas. She started her specialization in plastic surgery in Germany (Eduardus-Krankenhaus) but she did not finish it. She opened her first surgery office in Madrid in 2017.

In April 2019 she left the Spanish Society of Aesthetic Medicine after being reprimanded for violating the Deontological Code.

== Miss Spain 2010 ==
Barber was the first runner-up at Miss Spain 2010, which was won by Paula Guillo. She was later named as Miss World Spain 2011 by the Miss Spain organization.

== Miss World 2011 ==
Barber participated in the Miss World 2011 pageant on 6 November 2011 in London where she placed in the Top 15.

== Miss Universe Spain 2015 ==
Barber was crowned as Miss Universe Spain 2015 in Marbella during the Festival Starlite de la Costa del Sol held on 30 July 2015 by reigning titleholder Desirée Cordero.

Awards and achievements
Preceded by Fátima Jiménez	Miss España World; 2010	Succeeded by Aránzazu Estévez Godoy
Preceded by Desirée Cordero Ferrer	Miss Universe Spain; 2015	Succeeded by Noelia Freire
