= Miss Universe Slovenia =

National beauty pageant

Miss Universe Slovenija Organization
- Formation: 2001
- Type: Beauty pageant
- Headquarters: Ljubljana
- Location: Slovenia
- Members: Miss Universe
- Official language: Slovene
- Key people: Vladimir Kraljević

Miss Universe Slovenia (Slovene: Miss Universe Slovenija) is a national beauty pageant that selected Slovenia's representative to the Miss Universe pageant.

== History ==
In 2001 Slovenia began to participate in the Miss Universe history. Minka Alagič was crowned a first Miss Universe Slovenia pageant. In 2012, the main national pageant organizer "Delo Revije", a magazine company, lost the franchise license due to company's bankruptcy filed in 2011. In 2013, the franchise was acquired by "Vladimir Kraljevic", who is also the national director of Miss Universe Croatia. On March 30, 2017 "Sejem kozmetike in Lepote" had a right to control a new Miss Universe Slovenia to be an ambassador in Miss Universe history.

The Miss Universe Slovenia has officially broadcast on TV3 Slovenija.

In Mexico City, where Miss Universe 2007 was held, Tjaša Kokalj, Miss Universe Slovenia 2007, placed in the Top 15, becoming the first Slovenian semifinalist at the Miss Universe pageant in history.

== Titleholders ==
- : Declared as Winner
- : Ended as runner-up or top 5/6 qualification
- : Ended as one of the finalists or semifinalists
- : Ended as special awards winner

The winner of Miss Universe Slovenia represents her country at the Miss Universe. On occasion, when the winner does not qualify (due to age) a runner-up is sent.

Year	Municipality	Miss Universe Sloveneje	Placement at Miss Universe	Special Award(s)	Notes
Did not compete in 2026
2025	Šempeter-Vrtojba	Hana Klaut	Unplaced		Vladimir Kraljević Directorship.
Did not compete between 2018 – 2024
2017	Ptuj	Emina Ekić	Unplaced		Sejem Kozmetika in Lapote Company (TV3) Directorship.
2016	Ljubljana	Lucija Potočnik	Unplaced		
2015	Slovenske Konjice	Ana Haložan	Withdrew		Suffered an accident when she arrived in Las Vegas, which resulted in hospitalization, preventing her from participating in registration activities, interviews and pictorials; despite her withdrawal, she was given an opportunity to walk on the stage during the live telecast.
2014	Maribor	Urška Bračko	Unplaced		
2013	Maribor	Nina Đurđević	Unplaced		Vladimir Kraljevic Directorship.
2012	Did not compete				
2011	Ljubljana	Ema Jagodič	Unplaced		
2010	Šmartno pri Litiji	Marika Savšek	Unplaced		
2009	Ljubljana	Mirela Korač	Unplaced		
2008	Lukovica	Anamarija Avbelj	Unplaced		
2007	Ljubljana	Tjaša Kokalj	Top 15		
2006	Sevnica	Nataša Pinoza	Unplaced		
2005	Vrhnika	Dalila Dragojevič	Unplaced		
2004	Trbovlje	Sabina Remar	Unplaced		
2003	Maribor	Polona Baš	Unplaced		
2002	Kranj	Iris Mulej	Unplaced		
2001	Maribor	Minka Alagič	Unplaced		Delo Revije Magazine Directorship.

=== Municipality Ranking ===
Municipality	Title	Year
Ljubljana	4	2007, 2009, 2011, 2016
Maribor	4	2001, 2003, 2013, 2014
Šempeter-Vrtojba	1	2025
Ptuj	1	2017
Slovenske Konjice	1	2015 (Note: Did not compete)
Šmartno pri Litiji	1	2010
Lukovica	1	2008
Sevnica	1	2006
Vrhnika	1	2005
Trbovlje	1	2004
Kranj	1	2002
