= Adriana Reverón =

Spanish model and beauty pageant titleholder

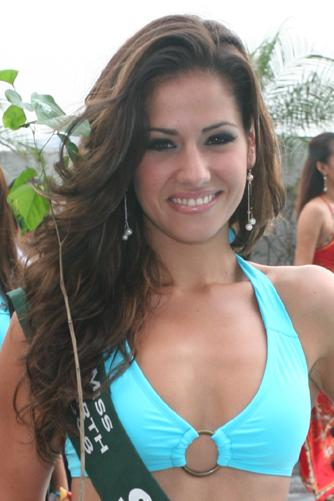
- Born: Adriana Reverón Moreno; November 2, 1985 (age 40); Los Cristianos, Tenerife, Canary Islands, Spain
- Other name: Adriana Reverón
- Height: 1.78 m (5 ft 10 in)
- Beauty pageant titleholder
- Title: Miss Tenerife 2006; Miss España Tierra 2008; Miss España Universo 2010
- Hair color: Brown
- Eye color: Brown
- Major competitions: Miss España 2007 (1st Runner-Up); Miss Earth 2008 (Top 8); Miss España Universo 2010 (Winner); Miss Universe 2010 (Unplaced)

Adriana Reverón Moreno (born November 2, 1985) is a Spanish model and beauty pageant titleholder who represented her country in the Miss Universe 2010 and Miss Earth 2008 competitions.

== Early life ==
Prior to competing in Miss Spain, Reverón was working as a model and completing her studies in Technical Architecture.

== Pageants ==
=== Miss Tenerife ===
Reverón, who stands 1.78 m (5 ft 10 in) tall, competed as Miss Maxarco in her province's local beauty pageant Miss Tenerife, held in Icod de los Vinos, placing first runner-up to Miss Puerto de la Cruz, Marta Domínguez. However, Domínguez resigned to pursue dreams as a singer, and Reverón took over the title of Miss Tenerife 2006.

=== Miss Spain ===
As the official representative of her province in the 2007 Miss Spain pageant, Reverón placed first runner-up to eventual Miss España 2007, Natalia Zabala of Gipuzkoa. At some point in the competition, Reverón was even ahead of the winner, and only 7 points separated her from the crown, placing first runner-up for the second consecutive time.

In October 2007, Reverón finished her reign as Miss Tenerife and, as the first runner-up to Miss Spain 2007, she had not competed in any international pageant. At first, she was going to participate in Miss Europe, but the pageant was not organized in 2007.

=== Miss Earth 2008 ===
A year later, she was selected to participate in Miss Earth 2008, placing as one of top 16 semifinalists who moved forward to compete for the title. She achieved one of the eight highest swimsuit scores, which allowed her to advance to the next stage of the pageant and participate in the evening gown competition, finishing her participation in Miss Earth 2008 as one of the top eight finalists.

=== Miss Universe 2010 ===
A couple of years later, a special competition was put together by the Miss Spain organization to select Spain's representative to Miss Universe 2010, since the gala event for Miss Spain 2010 was pushed back to September, a month after the Miss Universe telecast. Reverón was selected.

Awards and achievements
Preceded by Estíbaliz Pereira	Miss España Universo; 2010	Succeeded by Paula Guilló
Preceded by Ángela Gómez	Miss España Tierra; 2008	Succeeded by Alejandra Echevarría
Preceded by Marta Domínguez (resigned)	Miss Tenerife; 2006	Succeeded by Patricia Yurena Rodríguez
