= Miss Spain 2014 =

Miss Spain 2014 may refer to these events:

- Miss Universe Spain 2014, Miss Spain 2014 for Miss Universe 2014
- Miss World Spain 2014, Miss Spain 2014 for Miss World 2014
