= Marika Savšek =

Slovenian beauty pageant titleholder (born 1986)

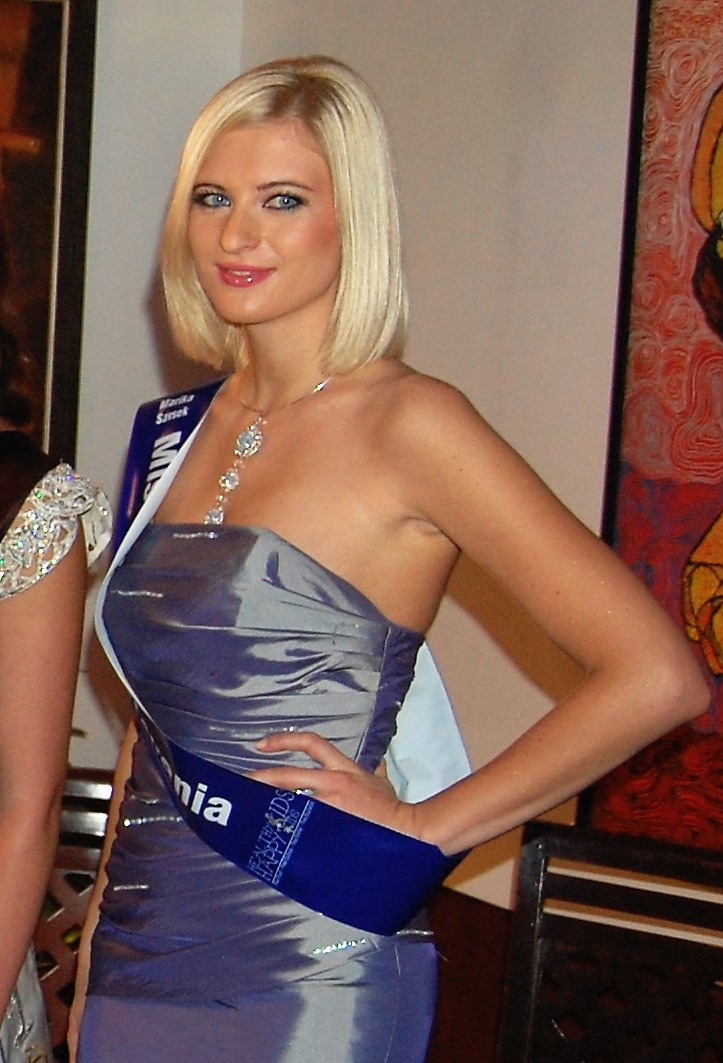
- Savšek in 2011
- Born: Marika Savšek c. 1986 (age 39–40); Šmartno pri Litiji, Slovenia
- Height: 1.75 m (5 ft 9 in)
- Beauty pageant titleholder
- Title: Miss Universe Slovenia 2010
- Hair color: Blonde
- Eye color: Blue
- Major competitions: Miss Universe Slovenia 2010 (Winner); Miss Universe 2010 (Unplaced)

Marika Savšek (born c. 1986) is a Slovene model and beauty pageant titleholder who was crowned Miss Universe Slovenia 2010 and represented her country at Miss Universe 2010.

== Early life ==
Born in Šmartno pri Litiji, Savšek grew up with brothers Andrej, Janez; and sister Ana. Prior to competing in Miss Universe Slovenia, she was a member of France Marolt Academic Folklore Group.

== Miss Universe Slovenia 2010 ==
Savšek competed as Miss Litija in her country's national beauty pageant Miss Universe Slovenije, held in Ljubljana on May 14, 2010, initially placing second runner-up to Sandra Marinovič of Trbovlje.

Three days later, an accounting error was revealed to the press, in which the names of the winner and her two runners-up were read in reverse order, meaning Savšek was the rightful Miss Universe Slovenia 2010. She was crowned on May 17, gaining the right to represent her country in Miss Universe 2010.

== Miss Universe 2010 ==
As the official representative of her country to the 2010 Miss Universe pageant broadcast live from Las Vegas, Nevada on August 23, Savšek participated as one of the 83 delegates who vied for the crown of eventual winner, Ximena Navarrete of Mexico.

Awards and achievements
Preceded by Mirela Korač	Miss Universe Slovenia; 2010	Succeeded by Ema Jagodic
