= Miss Spain 2018 =

Miss Spain 2018 may refer to these events:

- Miss Universe Spain 2018, Miss Spain 2018 for Miss Universe 2018
- Miss World Spain 2018, Miss Spain 2018 for Miss World 2018
