= Temisas Astronomical Observatory =

Astronomical observatory in Gran Canaria, Canary Islands

Observatorio Astronomico del Temisas
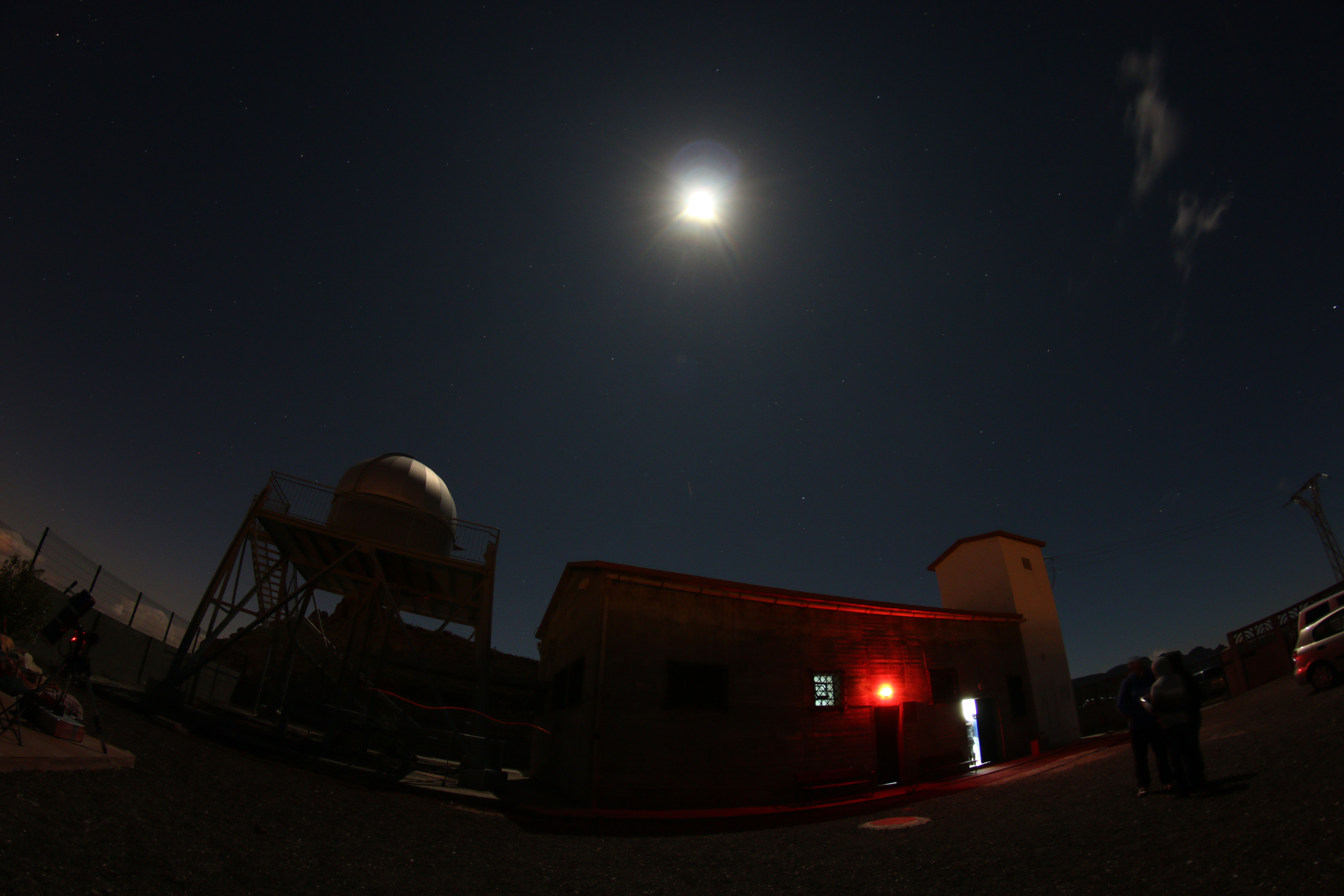
- Temisas Observatory during the 2015 lunar eclipse
- Location: Montaña de Arriba; 35270 Temisas (Agüimes); Gran Canaria, Spain
- Coordinates: 27.8986182°N 15.5319536°W
- Altitude: 850 metres (2,790 ft)
- Website: astrotemisas.probooking.es/en
- Location within Canary Islands
- Related media on Commons

The Temisas Astronomical Observatory (Spanish: Observatorio Astronomico del Temisas) is an astronomical observatory on the island of Gran Canaria in the Canary Islands, Spain. It is located on Montaña de Arriba, Temisas, in the Agüimes municipality in the south-east of the island, at an altitude of 850 metres (2,790 ft).

The observatory was opened in 2008 and is operated by the Fundación Canaria Observatorio de Temisas.

== Facilities ==
Temisas Observatory is mostly aimed at an educational and tourist market, and runs a regular program of public events.

The observatory has a Meade LX600 ACF Schmidt–Cassegrain telescope with a 14-inch (360 mm) mirror, f8. Additionally it has a range of smaller telescopes for visitors, an exhibition hall and a visitors' centre.
