= Miss Universe Spain 2014 =

Beauty pageant

- Date: September 10, 2014
- Presenters: Luís Muñoz and Beatriz Jarrín
- Entertainment: Jesús de Manuel; Tenosaya
- Venue: Teatro Barceló, Madrid, Spain
- Entrants: 14
- Placements: 6
- Winner: Desirée Cordero; Sevilla

Miss Spain Universe 2014 was the second edition of the Miss Universe Spain beauty pageant. It was held on October 28, 2014, at the Teatro Bodevil in the city of Madrid. Patricia Yurena Rodríguez, Miss Spain Universe 2013, crowned the winner Desirée Cordero Ferrer as her successor who represented Spain in the Miss Universe 2014.

== Results ==
=== Placements ===
Placement	Candidates
Miss Universe Spain 2014	Sevilla – Desirée Cordero Ferrer
1st Runner-Up	Zaragoza – Raquel Ruíz
2nd Runner-Up	Las Palmas – Mamen Yuma Matallah
Top 6	Ceuta – Meriem Mustafa Mohamed; Barcelona – Bárbara Amérigo; Cádiz – Beatriz Jiménez

== Candidates ==
14 candidates competed in the contest:

Candidates	Age	Height	Hometown
Bárbara Amérigo	23	1.71 m (5 ft 7 1/2 in)	Barcelona
Beatriz Jiménez	26	1.76 m (5 ft 9 1/2 in)	Cádiz
Carmen Recio	24	1.84 m (6 ft 1/2 in)	Málaga
Caroline Rueda	20	1.76 m (5 ft 9 1/2 in)	Málaga
Cristina Martínez	23	1.78 m (5 ft 10 in)	Valencia
Desirée Cordero Ferrer	21	1.78 m (5 ft 10 in)	Sevilla
Irene Alfageme	21	1.74 m (5 ft 8 1/2 in)	Extremadura
Inés Macarro Alzina	21	1.84 m (6 ft 1/2 in)	Islas Baleares
Izaskun Etxeberría	24	1.74 m (5 ft 8 1/2 in)	Vizcaya
Mamen Yuma Matallah	24	1.86 m (6 ft 1 in)	Las Palmas
Meriem Mustafa Mohamed	27	1.77 m (5 ft 9 1/2 in)	Ceuta
Raquel Arias	22	1.78 m (5 ft 10 in)	Madrid
Raquel Ruíz	19	1.81 m (5 ft 11 1/2 in)	Zaragoza
Úrsula Zueco	26	1.80 m (5 ft 11 in)	Aragón
