= Miss Universe Spain 2013 =

Beauty pageant

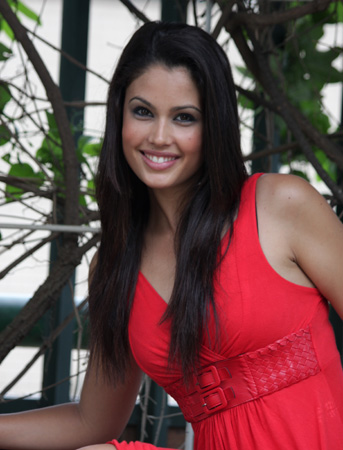
- Patricia Rodríguez, Miss Universe Spain 2013
- Date: 18 July 2013
- Venue: Convention Center at the Hotel Ada Palace, Madrid, Spain
- Entrants: 12
- Placements: 6
- Winner: Patricia Rodríguez; Tenerife
- Congeniality: Kaira Cabrera
- Best National Costume: Patricia Rodríguez; Tenerife
- Photogenic: Patricia Rodríguez; Tenerife

Miss Universe Spain 2013 was the first edition of the Miss Universe Spain pageant, held on 11 September 2013, selecting the Spanish representative to Miss Universe 2013 as a result of the discontinuation of the traditional Miss Spain pageant which was last held in 2011.

Beating 11 other finalists, the winner was Patricia Yurena Rodríguez, a former Miss Spain 2008 winner and Miss World 2008 semi-finalist. She eventually placed as the first runner-up at the Miss Universe 2013 pageant.

== Results ==
=== Placements ===
Placement	Contestant
Miss Universe Spain 2013	Tenerife – Patricia Yurena Rodríguez
1st Runner-Up	Madrid – Lidia Santos
2nd Runner-Up	Jaén – Ana Montabes
Top 6	Las Palmas – Mariona Elías; Soria – Sara Niño; Barcelona – Belen Matas
