= Desirée Cordero Ferrer =

Spanish model (born 1993)

Desirée Cordero
- Born: Desirée Cordero Ferrer; 13 September 1993 (age 33); Seville, Spain
- Other name: "Desi"
- Height: 1.78 m (5 ft 10 in)
- Beauty pageant titleholder
- Title: Miss Universe Spain 2014
- Hair color: Dark blonde
- Eye color: Green
- Major competitions: Miss Universe Spain 2014 (Winner); Miss Universe 2014; (Top 10)

Desirée Cordero Ferrer (born 13 September 1993) is a Spanish model and beauty pageant titleholder who was crowned Miss Universe Spain 2014. She represented Spain at the Miss Universe 2014 in the United States where she made the Top 10 finalist.

== Early life ==
Cordero is successful model in Spain. In 2016 and 2017 she dated Portuguese footballer Cristiano Ronaldo.

== Pageantry ==
=== Miss Universe Spain 2014 ===
Cordero was crowned as Miss Universe Spain 2014 on October 28, 2014, by outgoing titleholder Patricia Yurena Rodríguez.

=== Miss Universe 2014 ===
Cordero represented her country in the Miss Universe 2014. She competed with 87 women and placed as a Top 10 semi-finalist.

Awards and achievements
Preceded by Patricia Yurena Rodríguez	Miss Universe Spain; 2014	Succeeded by Carla Barber García
