= Patricia Rodríguez (model) =

Spanish actress and model, Miss Spain 2008, Miss Universe Spain 2013

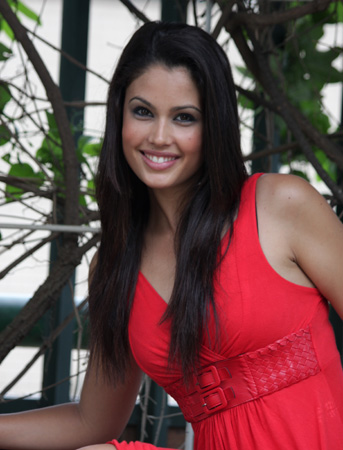
- Rodríguez in 2008
- Born: Patricia Yurena Rodríguez Alonso; 6 March 1990 (age 36); Granadilla de Abona, Tenerife, Spain
- Height: 1.79 m (5 ft 10 1/2 in)
- Beauty pageant titleholder
- Title: Miss Tenerife 2007; Miss Spain 2008; Miss Universe Spain 2013
- Hair color: Brown
- Eye color: Brown
- Major competitions: Miss Spain 2008 (Winner); Miss World 2008 (Top 15); Miss Universe Spain 2013 (Winner); Miss Universe 2013 (1st Runner-Up)

Patricia Yurena Rodríguez Alonso (born 6 March 1990) is a Spanish actress, model, and beauty pageant titleholder who was crowned Miss Spain 2008 and then Miss Universe Spain 2013. She represented Spain at Miss World 2008, where she placed in the top fifteen, and at Miss Universe 2013, where she placed as 1st Runner-Up.

In August 2014, during the end of her reign as Miss Universe Spain, Rodríguez revealed she was in a relationship with a woman through her Instagram, becoming the first out LGBT woman to hold a major national pageant title. Although she was not out while competing, Rodríguez became the second competitor in a major international beauty pageant to come out as LGBT, following Julia Lemigova, who represented the Soviet Union at Miss Universe 1991. In February 2021, Rodríguez confirmed her pansexuality and that she was currently in a relationship with a man, saying that "love does not understand gender".

== Early life ==
Rodríguez was born in Granadilla de Abona on the island of Tenerife within the Canary Islands of Spain. She began modeling professionally as a teenager.

== Pageantry ==
=== Miss Spain 2008 ===
In March 2008, Rodríguez represented Tenerife at Miss Spain 2008. She advanced from the initial group of 52 entrants to the top twenty, then top twelve, and ultimately the top six. After entering the top six, Rodríguez went on to win the title. As Miss Spain, Rodríguez was to represent Spain at Miss Universe 2008; however, Miss Universe rules stipulated that all entrants must have turned 18 by 1 February of the year of the contest, while Rodríguez had only turned 18 that March. After being declared ineligible due to her age, Rodríguez was selected to compete at Miss World 2008 instead, while her first runner-up Claudia Moro was selected to represent Spain at Miss Universe.

Later that year, Rodríguez arrived in Johannesburg to represent Spain at Miss World 2008. Of the initial 109 delegates, she advanced to the top fifteen, but did not make it to the top five. Ksenia Sukhinova of Russia was ultimately crowned the winner.

=== Miss Universe Spain 2013 ===
The Miss Spain Organization held the Spanish license for Miss Universe, so for years Rodríguez was ineligible to compete again in the hope of representing Spain at Miss Universe. However, in 2013, the organization was split into two separate organizations: Miss World Spain and Miss Universe Spain. Rodríguez was selected as one of the twelve delegates at the inaugural Miss Universe Spain 2013 competition, held in Madrid. She advanced to the top six, where she ultimately was crowned the winner.

As Miss Universe Spain, Rodríguez was given the right to represent Spain at the Miss Universe 2013 competition in Moscow. She went on to receive immense success at Miss Universe, advancing from the initial 86 delegates to the top sixteen, top ten, top five, and ultimately placed as the first runner-up behind Gabriela Isler of Venezuela. This was the best result Spain had received in the competition since Teresa Sánchez López was 1st Runner-Up at Miss Universe 1985.

=== Miss Universe 2013 ===
Rodríguez represented Spain at Miss Universe 2013 on 9 November 2013, finishing as 1st Runner-Up to María Gabriela Isler of Venezuela, her roommate during the competition. She is also only one of seven former Miss World semifinalists to place in the Miss Universe semifinals, the others being Michelle McLean of Namibia in 1992, Christine Straw of Jamaica in 2004, Ada de la Cruz of the Dominican Republic in 2009, Yendi Phillips also of Jamaica in 2010, Catriona Gray of the Philippines in 2018, Julia Gama of Brazil in 2020, and Andrea Meza of Mexico in 2020 (coincidentally Rodriguez, de la Cruz, Phillips, and Gama all finished as 1st Runner-Up).

== Personal life ==
In August 2014, Rodríguez publicized her romantic relationship with Spanish DJ Vanesa Klein through her Instagram account. This revelation sparked international headlines referring to Rodríguez as a lesbian, with Rodríguez becoming the first major national pageant titleholder to be out as LGBT, and the second woman out as LGBT to have competed in one of the major international beauty pageants, following Julia Lemigova, who represented the Soviet Union at Miss Universe 1991.

In February 2021, Rodríguez announced her pregnancy and said that she was in a relationship with a man, saying that "love does not understand gender", confirming her pansexuality.

She gave birth to a girl in August 2021.

== Filmography ==
Year	Title	Role	Medium	Notes
2010	Aliens vs. Predator	Female Colonial Marines	Video game	Voice role
2014	Tal como eres		Short film	Directed by Román Reyes. Produced by HYPNOS Films.

Awards and achievements
Preceded by (Philippines) Janine Tugonon	Miss Universe 1st Runner-Up; 2013	Succeeded by (United States) Nia Sanchez
Preceded by Andrea Huisgen	Miss Universe Spain; 2013	Succeeded by Desirée Cordero
Preceded by Natalia Zabala	Miss World Spain; 2008	Succeeded by Carmen García
Preceded by Natalia Zabala	Miss Spain; 2008	Succeeded by Estíbaliz Pereira
Preceded by Adriana Reverón	Miss Tenerife; 2007	Succeeded by Sara Elena Pérez
