= Alice Rowland Musukwa =

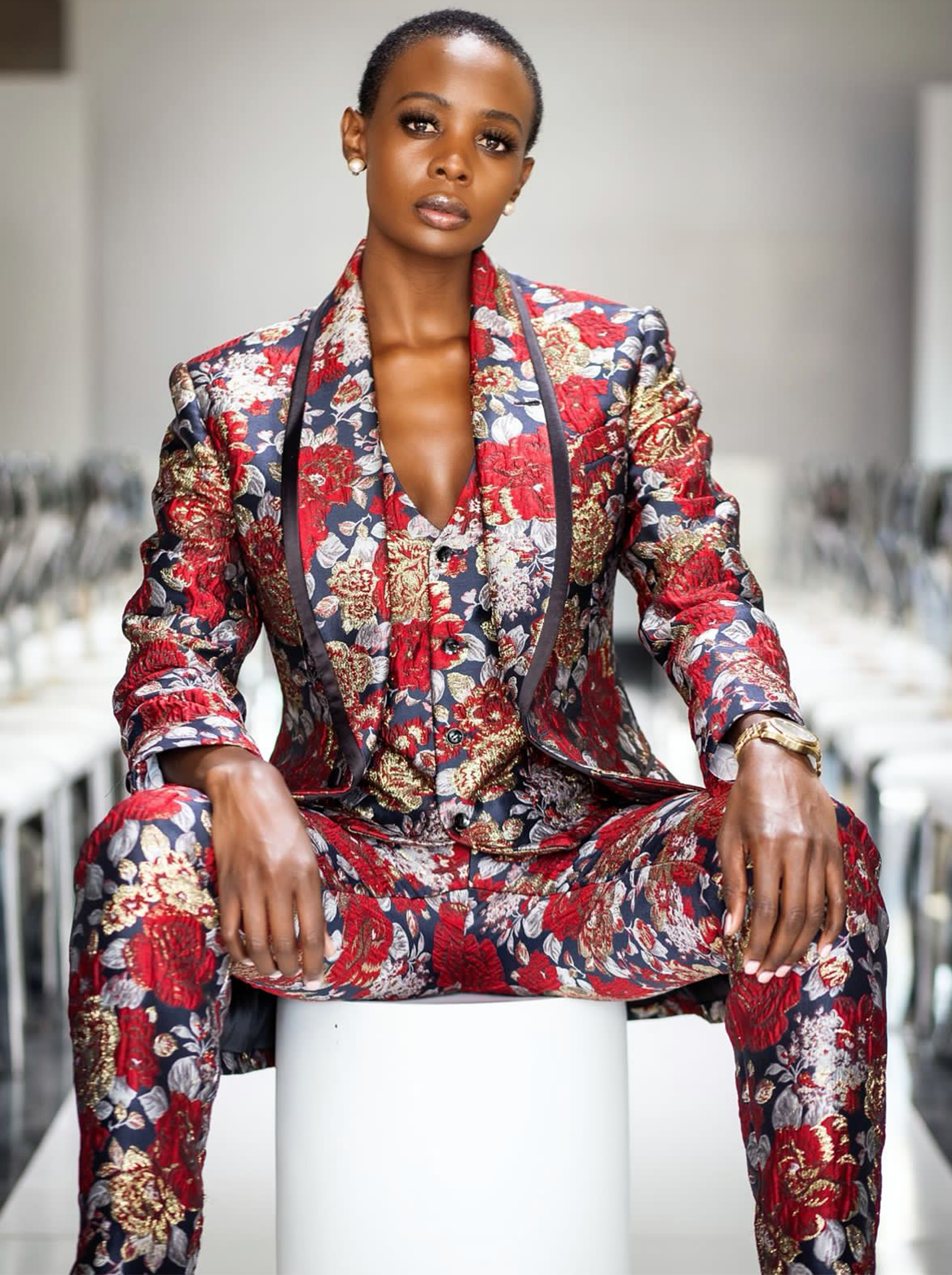
- Born: 26 December 1987 (age 38); Lusaka
- Citizenship: Zambian
- Occupations: International model, Political and social blogger
- Height: 5’11
- Beauty pageant titleholder
- Title: Miss Universe Zambia 2010
- Agency: Ice Models Johannesburg: Ice Models Durban; Fusion models Cape Town; Deco Models Miami
- Hair color: Black
- Eye color: Brown
- Major competitions: Miss Universe Zambia 2010 (Winner); Miss Universe 2010 (Unplaced)
- Website: alicerowlands.com

Alice Rowland Musukwa is a Zambian businesswoman, model, and beauty pageant titleholder. In 2010, she won the Miss Universe Zambia competition and was the country's representative at the Miss Universe the same year. She is also the current pageant national director of Miss Universe Zambia and Miss Teen Zambia.

Awards and achievements
Preceded by Andella Chileshe Matthews	Miss Universe Zambia; 2010	Succeeded by Isabel Chikoti
