= Miss Universe 2010 =

59th Miss Universe competition, beauty pageant edition

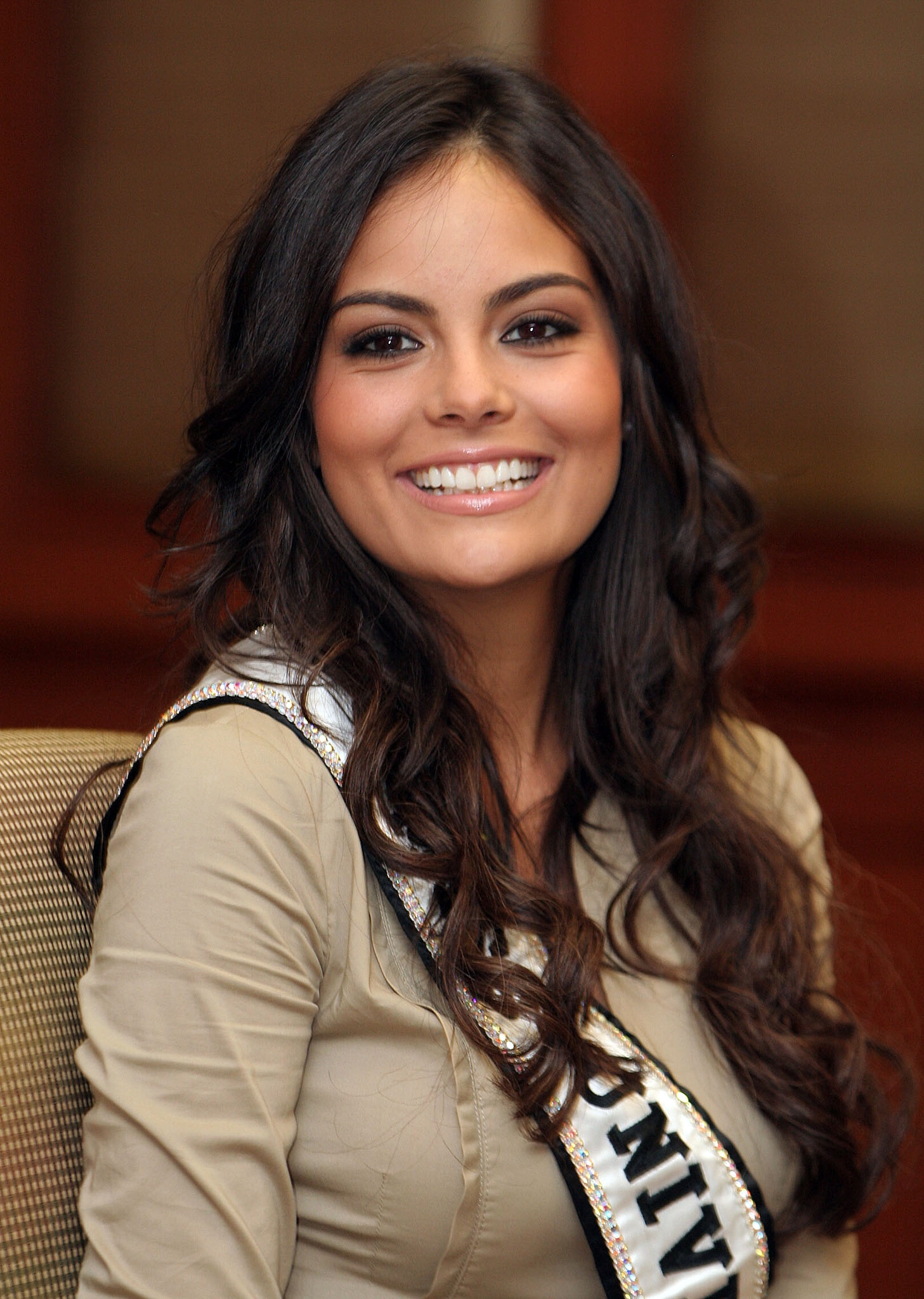
- Ximena Navarrete
- Date: August 23, 2010
- Presenters: Bret Michaels; Natalie Morales
- Entertainment: John Legend; The Roots; Cirque du Soleil
- Venue: Mandalay Bay Events Center, Las Vegas, Nevada, United States
- Broadcaster: NBC (KVBC-DT); Telemundo (KBLR)
- Entrants: 83
- Placements: 15
- Withdrawals: Bulgaria; Cayman Islands; Estonia; Ethiopia; Iceland; Montenegro; Namibia; Vietnam
- Returns: Botswana; British Virgin Islands; Denmark; Haiti; Kazakhstan; Sri Lanka; Trinidad and Tobago; United States Virgin Islands
- Winner: Ximena Navarrete; Mexico
- Congeniality: Jesinta Campbell, Australia
- Best National Costume: Fonthip Watcharatrakul, Thailand
- Photogenic: Fonthip Watcharatrakul, Thailand

Miss Universe 2010 was the 59th Miss Universe pageant, held at the Mandalay Bay Events Center in Las Vegas, Nevada, United States, on August 23, 2010.

At the end of the event, Stefanía Fernández of Venezuela crowned Ximena Navarrete of Mexico as Miss Universe 2010. It was Mexico's second victory after their victory in 1991.

Contestants from eighty-three countries and territories participated in this year's pageant. The pageant was hosted by Bret Michaels and Natalie Morales. John Legend, The Roots, and Cirque du Soleil performed in this year's pageant.

== Background ==
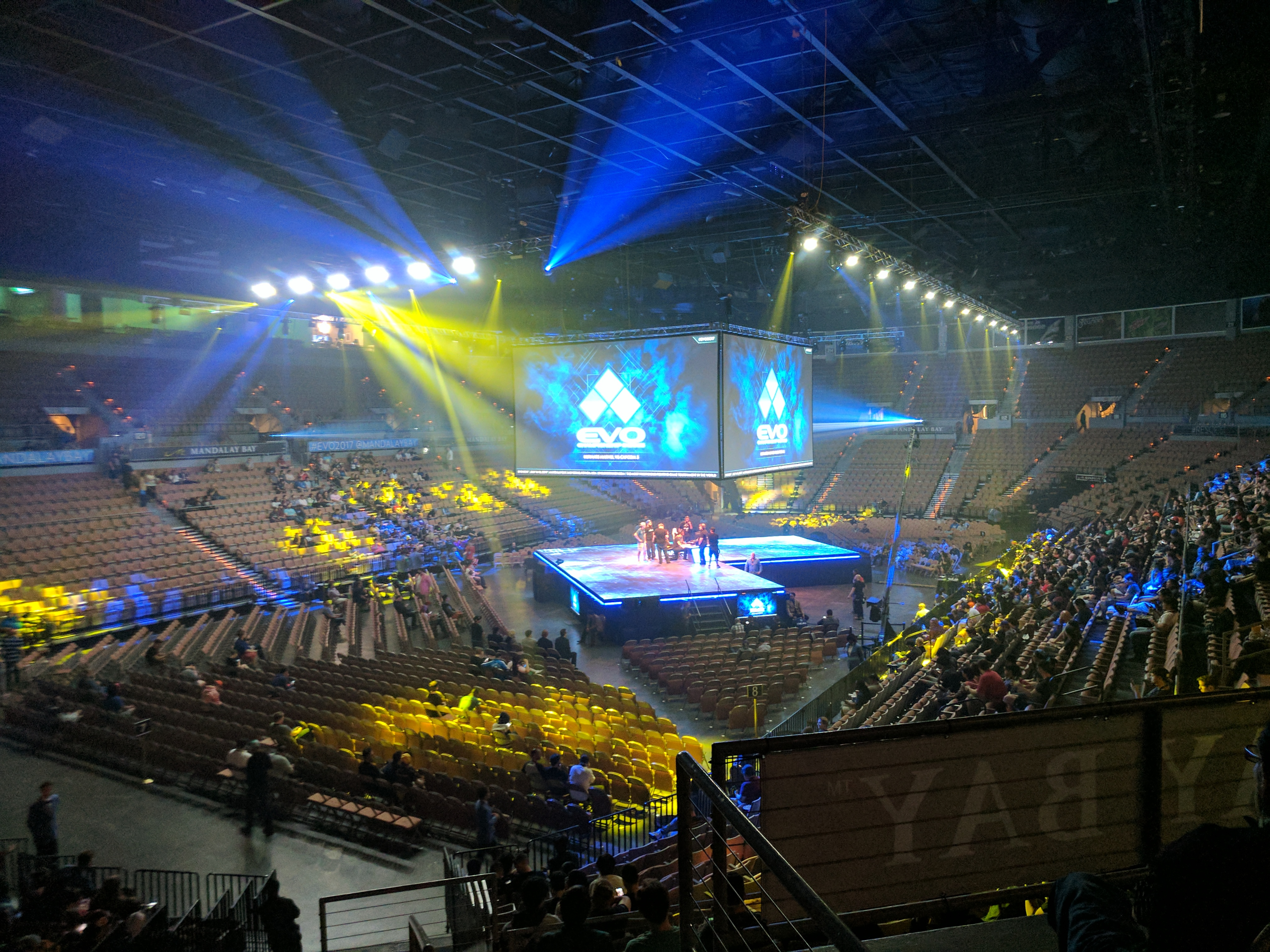
Mandalay Bay Events Center, the venue of Miss Universe 2010

=== Location and date ===
Several cities from across the world had expressed interest to host the pageant. Among these cities that bid to host the pageant is Zagreb, Croatia which previously dropped its bid to host the pageant in 2009. The Croatian government and local investors renewed their proposal for the pageant, which would take place at the Arena Zagreb. However, on February 20, 2010, the national director of Miss Universe Croatia Vladimir Krajelvic announced that the country withdrew its bid to host the contest due to the impacts in Croatia from the 2008 financial crisis.

On January 31, 2010, the Miss Universe Organization was in talks to host the 2010 edition of the competition in Santa Cruz de la Sierra in Bolivia after the Miss Universe commission visited Bolivia to evaluate if the city is capable to host the pageant. However, during the visit of the commission in Bolivia, Minister of Culture Zulma Yugar publicly admitted the difficulties in hosting the pageant in line with the organization's demands. After a meeting held in La Paz in March 2010, Yugar formally announced that Santa Cruz withdrew its bid to host the pageant, alleging that the organization "disrespected the Constitution of Bolivia" and that the demands of the organization are financially impossible to attain.

After several cities withdrew its bid to host the pageant, on May 25, 2010, the Miss Universe Organization confirmed that the competition would be at the Mandalay Bay Events Center in Las Vegas, Nevada, United States on August 23, 2010.

=== Selection of participants ===
Contestants from eighty-three countries and territories were selected to compete in the competition. Two of these delegates were appointees to their positions after being a runner-up of their national pageant or being selected through a casting process, three were selected to replace the original dethroned winner, and another was crowned after the organization discovered that there was an error in the placements of the finalists.

Jéssica Schell, the second runner-up of Miss Guatemala 2010, was appointed to represent Guatemala after Alejandra Barillas, Miss Guatemala 2010, had a foot injury. Barillas competed in the pageant the following year. Alexandra Cătălina Filip, Miss Universe Romania 2010, was replaced by her first runner-up, Oana Paveluc, as she refused to sign the contract with the Miss Universe Organization preventing her from representing Romania at a major dance competition in South Korea. Serenay Sarikaya, Miss Turkey Universe 2010, was replaced by Miss Turkey 2010 Gizem Memiç as she wanted to continue her acting career.

Sandra Marinovič originally was crowned as Miss Universe Slovenia 2010. However, Marinovič was stripped of the crown after three days when the organization discovered that there was a computational error in transcribing the judges' scores. The official winner was Marika Savšek, who was previously placed as second runner-up.

Venus Raj originally was crowned Binibining Pilipinas Universe 2010. However, due to inconsistencies with her birth certificate, Raj was stripped off the title. The title was given to Helen Nicolette Henson, the 2nd Runner-Up of Binibining Pilipinas 2010. However, two months after her dethronement, Raj reclaimed her title as Binibining Pilipinas Universe 2010 after obtaining a legal Philippine passport.

The 2010 edition saw the returns of Botswana, the British Virgin Islands, Denmark, Haiti, Kazakhstan, Sri Lanka, Trinidad and Tobago, and the United States Virgin Islands. Haiti last competed in 1989, making the first time the country competed after two decades of withdrawal. The British Virgin Islands last competed in 2002, Botswana last competed in 2004, the US Virgin Islands last competed in 2007, while the others last competed in 2008. Bulgaria, the Cayman Islands, Estonia, Ethiopia, Iceland, Montenegro, Namibia, and Vietnam withdrew from the pageant. Nikolina Lončar, Miss Montenegro 2010, was replaced by Marijana Pokrajac as the representative of Montenegro due to being underage. However, Pokrajac withdrew due to undisclosed reasons. Lončar competed in the pageant the following year. Odile Gertze, Miss Namibia 2010, withdrew due to being crowned one week from the official start of Miss Universe 2010. Phạm Thị Thanh Hằng of Vietnam withdrew due to lack of preparation. Bulgaria, the Cayman Islands, Estonia, Ethiopia, and Iceland withdrew from the competition after its respective organization failed to hold a national competition or appoint a delegate.

== Results ==
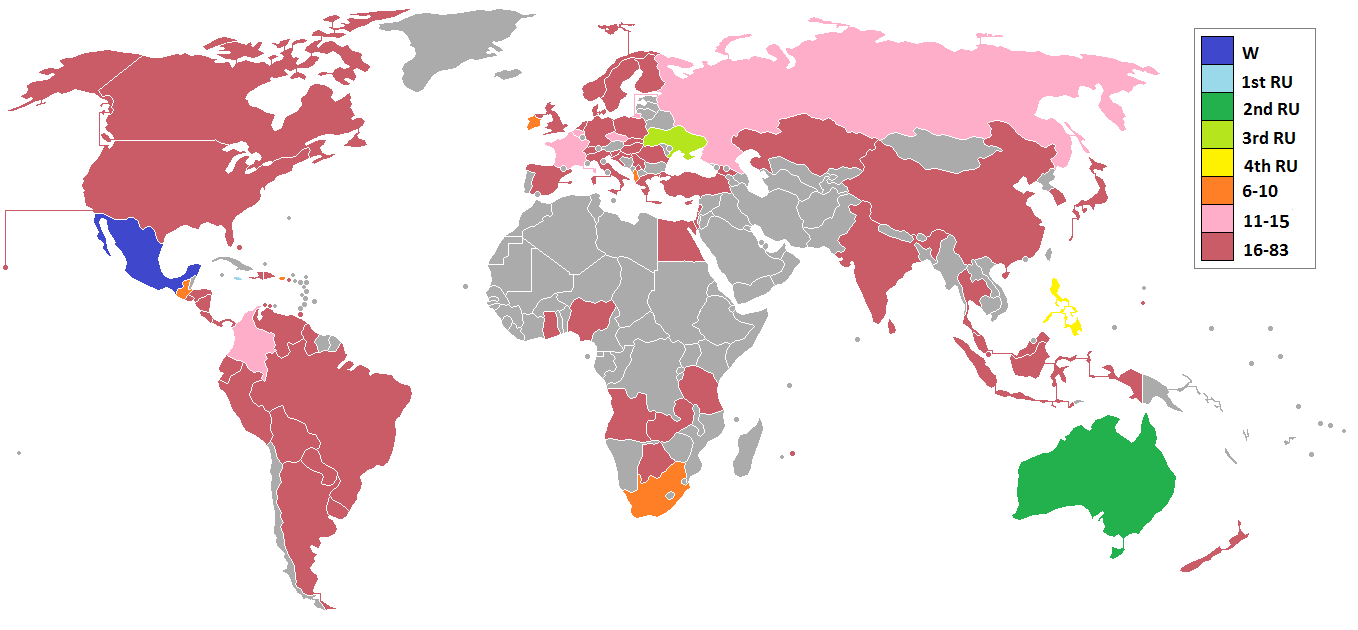
Miss Universe 2010 participating countries and territories.

=== Placements ===
Placement	Contestant
Miss Universe 2010	Mexico – Ximena Navarrete
1st Runner-Up	Jamaica – Yendi Phillipps
2nd Runner-Up	Australia – Jesinta Campbell
3rd Runner-Up	Ukraine – Anna Poslavska
4th Runner-Up	Philippines – Venus Raj
Top 10	Albania – Angela Martini; Guatemala – Jessica Scheel; Ireland – Rozanna Purcell; Puerto Rico – Mariana Vicente; South Africa – Nicole Flint
Top 15	Belgium – Cilou Annys; Colombia – Natalia Navarro; Czech Republic – Jitka Válková; France – Malika Ménard; Russia – Irina Antonenko

==== Final Scores ====
Country/Territory	Swimsuit	Evening Gown
Mexico	9.265 (2)	8.913 (1)
Jamaica	9.426 (1)	8.884 (2)
Australia	8.543 (5)	8.841 (3)
Ukraine	8.333 (7)	8.743 (4)
Philippines	8.957 (3)	8.714 (5)
Albania	8.229 (8)	8.693 (6)
Ireland	8.784 (4)	8.548 (7)
South Africa	8.229 (8)	8.420 (8)
Guatemala	8.071 (10)	8.286 (9)
Puerto Rico	8.443 (6)	7.971 (10)
Russia	7.843 (11)	
Colombia	7.643 (12)	
France	7.586 (13)	
Belgium	7.571 (14)	
Czech Republic	7.429 (15)	

=== Special awards ===
Award	Contestant
Miss Congeniality	Australia – Jesinta Campbell
Miss Photogenic	Thailand – Fonthip Watcharatrakul
Best National Costume	Thailand – Fonthip Watcharatrakul

== Pageant ==
=== Format ===
Same with 2007, fifteen semifinalists were chosen through the preliminary competition— composed of the swimsuit and evening gown competitions and closed-door interviews. The fifteen semifinalists competed in the swimsuit competition and were narrowed down to ten afterward. The ten semifinalists competed in the evening gown competition and were narrowed down to five afterward. The five finalists competed in the question and answer round and the final look.

=== Selection committee ===
==== Preliminary competition ====
- Basim Shami – President of Farouk Systems
- BJ Coleman – Publicist, Journalist & Television Personality
- Carlos Bremer – CEO and General Director of Value Grupo Financiero
- Corinne Nicolas – President of Trump Model Management
- Louis Burgdorf – Talent Producer for MSNBC's Joe Scarborough & Mika Brzezinski
- Natalie Rotman – Television Host and Fashion Expert
- Sadoux Kim – Television producer

==== Final telecast ====
- Niki Taylor – Model
- William Baldwin – Actor, producer and writer
- Chynna Phillips – Singer and actress
- Evan Lysacek – Olympic Gold Medal Figure Skater and Dancing with the Stars finalist
- Tamron Hall – MSNBC anchor
- Chazz Palminteri – Actor and writer
- Jane Seymour – Actress and Dancing with the Stars participant
- Criss Angel – Illusionist and musician
- Sheila E. – Musician

== Contestants ==
Eighty-three contestants competed for the title.

Country/Territory	Contestant	Age (Note: Ages at the time of pageant.)	Hometown
Albania	Angela Martini	24	Shkoder
Angola	Jurema Ferraz	25	Moçâmedes
Argentina	Yésica Di Vincenzo	22	Mar del Plata
Aruba	Priscilla Lee	22	Oranjestad
Australia	Jesinta Campbell	19	Gold Coast
(The Bahamas) Bahamas	Braneka Bassett	20	Freeport
Belgium	Cilou Annys	19	Bruges
Bolivia	Claudia Arce	19	Sucre
Botswana	Tirelo Ramasedi	21	Gaborone
Brazil	Débora Lyra	20	Divinópolis
British Virgin Islands	Josefina Nunez	22	Road Town
Canada	Elena Semikina	26	Toronto
China	Tang Wen	18	Yichun
Colombia	Natalia Navarro	23	Barranquilla
Costa Rica	Marva Wright	25	San José
Croatia	Lana Obad	22	Zagreb
Curaçao	Safira de Wit	20	Willemstad
Cyprus	Demetra Olymbiou	22	Aradhippou
Czech Republic	Jitka Válková	18	Třebíč
Denmark	Ena Sandra Causevic	20	Sønderborg
Dominican Republic	Eva Arias	25	Moca
Ecuador	Lady Mina	24	Guayaquil
Egypt	Donia Hamed	22	Cairo
El Salvador	Sonia Cruz	20	San Salvador
Finland	Viivi Pumpanen	22	Vantaa
France	Malika Ménard	23	Hérouville-Saint-Clair
(Georgia (country)) Georgia	Nanuka Gogichaishvili	21	Tbilisi
Germany	Kristiana Rohder	26	Munich
Ghana	Awurama Simpson	22	Sekondi-Takoradi
(United Kingdom) Great Britain	Tara Hoyos-Martínez	20	London
Greece	Anna Prelević	20	Athens
Guam	Vanessa Torres	25	Dededo
Guatemala	Jessica Scheel	20	Retalhuleu
Guyana	Tamika Henry	22	Georgetown
Haiti	Sarodj Bertin	24	Port-au-Prince
Honduras	Kenia Martinez	26	Tela
Hungary	Tímea Babinyecz	19	Szeged
India	Ushoshi Sengupta	22	Kolkata
Indonesia	Qory Sandioriva	19	Banda Aceh
(Republic of Ireland) Ireland	Rozanna Purcell	19	Clonmel
Israel	Bat-el Jobi	22	Afula
Italy	Jessica Cecchini	20	Borgosesia
Jamaica	Yendi Phillipps	24	Kingston
Japan	Maiko Itai	26	Ōita
Kazakhstan	Asselina Kuchukova	27	Almaty
Kosovo	Kështjella Pepshi	23	Junik
Lebanon	Rahaf Abdallah	22	Khiam
Malaysia	Nadine Ann Thomas	23	Subang Jaya
Mauritius	Dalysha Doorga	23	Goodlands
Mexico	Ximena Navarrete	22	Guadalajara
Netherlands	Desirée van den Berg	23	Santpoort
New Zealand	Ria van Dyke	21	Auckland
Nicaragua	Scharllette Allen	18	Bluefields
Nigeria	Ngozi Odalonu	22	Niger
Norway	Melinda Elvenes	23	Larvik
Panama	Anyolí Ábrego	22	Santiago de Veraguas
Paraguay	Yohana Benitez	23	San Lorenzo
Peru	Giuliana Zevallos	22	Lima
Philippines	Venus Raj	22	Bato
Poland	Maria Nowakowska	23	Legnica
Puerto Rico	Mariana Vicente	21	Río Grande
Romania	Oana Paveluc	19	Braşov
Russia	Irina Antonenko	18	Yekaterinburg
Serbia	Lidija Kocić	22	Belgrade
Singapore	Tania Lim	22	Singapore
Slovakia	Anna Amenová	25	Bratislava
Slovenia	Marika Savšek	24	Šmartno pri Litiji
South Africa	Nicole Flint	22	Pretoria
South Korea	Joori Kim	22	Seoul
Spain	Adriana Reverón	24	Tenerife
Sri Lanka	Ishanka Madurasinghe	23	Kegalle
Sweden	Michaela Savić	19	Helsingborg
Switzerland	Linda Fäh	22	Benken
Tanzania	Hellen Dausen	23	Arusha
Thailand	Fonthip Watcharatrakul	20	Samut Prakan
Trinidad and Tobago	LaToya Woods	25	Couva
Turkey	Gizem Memiç	20	Gaziantep
Ukraine	Anna Poslavska	23	Nova Kakhovka
United States	Rima Fakih	24	Dearborn
United States Virgin Islands	Janeisha John	22	Saint Croix
Uruguay	Stephany Ortega	20	Montevideo
Venezuela	Marelisa Gibson	21	Caracas
Zambia	Alice Musukwa	22	Lusaka
