= Nina Đurđević =

- Born: Nina Đurđević; 1991 (age 34–35); Maribor, Slovenia
- Height: 1.78 m (5 ft 10 in)
- Beauty pageant titleholder
- Title: Miss Universe Slovenia 2013
- Hair color: Blonde
- Major competitions: Miss Universe Slovenia 2013 (Winner); Miss Universe 2013 (Unplaced)

Nina Đurđević (born 1991), is a Slovene model and beauty pageant titleholder. She was crowned titleholder of Miss Universe Slovenia 2013 and represented her country at the Miss Universe 2013 pageant.

== Miss Universe Slovenia 2013 ==
Nina was crowned as Miss Universe Slovenia 2013 and represented Slovenia in the Miss Universe 2013 in Moscow, Russia.

Awards and achievements
Preceded by Ema Jagodič	Miss Universe Slovenia; 2013	Succeeded by Urška Bračko
