= Jessica Scheel =

Guatemalan beauty pageant titleholder

- Born: Jessica Scheel; January 13, 1990 (age 36); Retalhuleu, Guatemala
- Height: 1.70 m (5 ft 7 in)
- Beauty pageant titleholder
- Title: Miss Guatemala Earth 2007; Miss Guatemala International 2010
- Hair color: Dark Brown
- Eye color: Brown
- Major competitions: Miss Guatemala Earth 2007 (Winner); Miss Earth 2007 (Unplaced); Miss Guatemala 2010 (Miss Guatemala International) (Miss Guatemala)^{[note 1]} Miss Universe 2010 (Top 10)

Jessica María Scheel Noyola (born January 13, 1990) is a Guatemalan model and beauty pageant titleholder who has competed at the Miss Guatemala, Miss Earth 2007 and Miss Universe 2010 pageant.

== Pageantry ==
=== Miss Guatemala 2010 ===
Jessica competed in Miss Guatemala 2010 where she was crowned as Miss Guatemala International 2010 in a pageant held in the country's capital Guatemala City on April 25, 2010.

=== Miss Universe 2010 ===
Because Alejandra Barrillas was unable to participate in Miss Universe 2010 after she sustained an injury to her left foot, she was replaced by Scheel. Scheel placed among the Top 15, breaking a 26-year non-placement streak for Guatemala. Jessica would later finish in the Top 10 (9th overall). During the evening gown competition her name was incorrectly given as "Jessica Torres".

== Notes ==
^{note 1} Scheel was originally 2nd Runner-Up (or Miss Guatemala International), but competed in Miss Universe after the original titleholder, Alejandra Barrillas, was unable to compete after she injured her left foot in an accident.
