= Estíbaliz Pereira =

Spanish beauty pageant titleholder (born 1986)

- Born: Estíbaliz Pereira Rábade; 12 July 1986 (age 40); A Coruña, Galicia, Spain
- Other name: Estíbaliz Pereira
- Height: 1.81 m (5 ft 11 1/2 in)
- Beauty pageant titleholder
- Title: Miss A Coruña 2008; Miss España 2009
- Hair color: Brown
- Eye color: Brown
- Major competitions: Miss España 2009 (Winner); Miss Universe 2009

Estíbaliz Pereira Rábade (born 12 July 1986) is a Spanish beauty pageant titleholder who was crowned Miss España 2009 at a gala event held in Cancún, Mexico. She represented Spain in Miss Universe 2009.

== Miss España ==
Representing her place of birth, A Coruña, Pereira became one of the favorites and she competed against 51 contestants for the title of Miss España 2009, held for the first time outside of Spain in Cancún, Mexico. She became the second Galician in history to capture the crown of Miss Spain and gaining the right to represent her country in Miss Universe 2009.

== Miss Universe 2009 ==
Pereira represented Spain in the 58th edition of the Miss Universe beauty pageant, held at the Atlantis Paradise Island, in Nassau, Bahamas on 23 August 2009. 84 contestants from different countries and territories competed in the event. Pereira, however, did not make it to the Top 15.

Awards and achievements
Preceded by Patricia Yurena Rodríguez	Miss España; 2009	Succeeded by Paula Guilló
Preceded by Claudia Moro	Miss Universe Spain; 2009	Succeeded by Adriana Reverón
