= Safira de Wit =

- Born: Safira de Wit c. 1989 (age 36–37); Willemstad, Curaçao
- Height: 1.81 m (5 ft 11 1/2 in)
- Beauty pageant titleholder
- Title: Miss Curaçao 2010
- Hair color: Brown
- Eye color: Brown
- Major competitions: Miss Curaçao 2010 (Winner) (Miss Press) (Miss Beautiful Body and Face); Miss Universe 2010 (Unplaced)

Safira de Wit (born c. 1989) is a Curaçaoan model and beauty pageant titleholder who was crowned Miss Curaçao 2010 and represented her country the 2010 Miss Universe pageant.

== Miss Universe Curaçao 2010 ==
De Wit, who stands 1.81 m (5 ft 11 1/2 in), competed as one of nine finalists in Miss Universe Curaçao 2010, held in Willemstad on November 21, 2009, where she obtained the Miss Press and Miss Beautiful Body & Face awards, eventually winning the crown and the right to represent the Dutch constituent country in Miss Universe 2010.

== Miss Universe 2010 ==
As the official representative of Curaçao to the 2010 Miss Universe pageant broadcast live from Paradise, Nevada on August 23, 2010 De Wit participated as one of the 83 delegates who vied for the crown of eventual winner, Ximena Navarrete of Mexico.

Awards and achievements
Preceded by Angenie Simon	Miss Universe Curaçao; 2010	Succeeded by Evelina Van Putten
