= Miss Guatemala 2010 =

- Date: April 25, 2010
- Venue: Auditorio Nacional, Guatemala City, Guatemala
- Broadcaster: Guatevisión
- Entrants: 14
- Winner: Alejandra José Barillas Solís; Zacapa

The Miss Guatemala 2010 pageant was held on April 25, 2010, at Auditorio Nacional in the capital city Guatemala City, Guatemala. This year only 14 candidates were competing for the national crown. The chosen winner represented Guatemala at the Miss Universe 2010 and at Miss Continente Americano 2010. The winner of best national costume, the costume was use in Miss Universe 2010. Miss World Guatemala represented Guatemala at the Miss World 2010. Miss Guatemala Internacional represented Guatemala at the Miss International 2010. The Semifinalist entered Miss Intercontinental 2010, Top Model of the World 2010 and Reina Hispanoamericana 2010.

The winner of Miss Guatemala 2010, Alejandra Barillas, could not enter Miss Universe 2010 because she injured her left foot in an accident. Miss Guatemala Internacional, Jessica Scheel took her spot and placed Guatemala in the Top 10 after 26 years without placing in the semifinals. One of the semifinalist took Barillas' spot in Miss International 2010. Miss Guatemala 2010 would enter Miss Universe 2011 without re-entering the pageant.

== Final results ==
Final results	Contestant
Miss Guatemala 2010	Zacapa - Alejandra Barillas
Miss World Guatemala	Sacatepéquez - Ana Mazariegos
Miss Guatemala Internacional	Retalhuleu - Jessica Scheel
Semifinalists	Santa Rosa - Karen Remón; Chimaltenango - Claudia García; Ciudad Capital - Blanca González

=== Special awards ===
- Miss Photogenic – Claudia García (Chimaltenango)
- Miss Congeniality (voted by the candidates) – Michelle Taylor (Petén)
- Best National Costume – Ana Mazariegos (Sacatepéquez)

=== Final Competition Scores ===
Representing	Evening Gown	Swimsuit	Average	Question
Zacapa	8.90	9.55	9.23	9.15
Sacatepéquez	9.00	8.85	8.93	9.05
Retalhuleu	9.20	9.30	9.25	8.90
Santa Rosa	8.80	8.20	8.50	
Chimaltenango	8.50	8.40	8.45	
Ciudad Capital	7.90	8.50	8.20	

Winner
Miss World Guatemala
Miss Guatemala Internacional
Top 6 Semifinalists

== Official Delegates ==
Represent	Contestant	Age	Height	Hometown
Alta Verapaz	Adrianna Aleo Reoris	20	1.71 m (5 ft 7 1/2 in)	Cobán
Baja Verapaz	Rosa María Peralta Welo	22	1.73 m (5 ft 8 in)	Salamá
Chimaltenango	Claudia Adriana García Alvarez	20	1.71 m (5 ft 7 1/2 in)	Chimaltenango
Ciudad Capital	Blanca Lucila González González	24	1.77 m (5 ft 9 1/2 in)	Ciudad Guatemala
Escuintla	Elisa Guadalupe Posadas Fletcher	20	1.67 m (5 ft 5 1/2 in)	Escuintla
Guatemala	Dina Gabriela Asturias Molina	20	1.83 m (6 ft 0 in)	Mixco
Jutiapa	Sandy Jazzel Monroy González	19	1.69 m (5 ft 6 1/2 in)	Jalapa
Petén	Michelle Jackelyne Taylor Collado	21	1.73 m (5 ft 8 in)	Flores
Quetzaltenango	Rudy Guadalupe Wilkos Peña	18	1.74 m (5 ft 8 1/2 in)	Quetzaltenango
Retalhuleu	Jessica María Scheel Noyola	20	1.75 m (5 ft 9 in)	Retalhuleu
Sacatepéquez	Ana Lucía Mazariegos Florentino	19	1.76 m (5 ft 9 1/2 in)	Nuevo San Carlos
Santa Rosa	Karen Lucrecia Remón Caceros	19	1.80 m (5 ft 11 in)	Cuilapa
(United States) USA Guatemala	Amelia Thomas Morrogán	18	1.71 m (5 ft 7 1/2 in)	Los Angeles
Zacapa	Alejandra José Barillas Solís	24	1.81 m (5 ft 11 1/2 in)	Zacapa
