= Miss World Spain 2018 =

- Date: September 15, 2018
- Venue: Hotel Alegría Costa Ballena, Rota, Cádiz, Spain
- Entrants: 52
- Placements: 20
- Withdrawals: Burgos; Canary Islands
- Returns: Ceuta
- Winner: Amaia Izar Leache Larumbe; Navarre

Miss World Spain 2018 was the 6th edition of the Miss World Spain pageant, held on September 15, 2018. The winner was Amaia Izar Leache Larumbe of Navarre and she represented Spain in Miss World 2018.

== Results ==
=== Placements ===
Placement	Contestant
Miss World Spain 2018	Navarre – Amaia Izar Leache Larumbe
1st Runner-Up	Tarragona – Anna Aznar
2nd Runner-Up	Ceuta – Beatriz Ribes
Top 7	Cádiz – Maribel Díaz; Córdoba – Marina Salcedo Muñoz; Madrid – Victoria González; Zaragoza – Andrea Cristobal
Top 15	Barcelona – Marina Fernández; Cantabria – Ainara de Santamaría; Cuenca – Marisa Escribano; Jaén – Elisa Arboleda; Las Palmas – Elena Macías; Málaga – Ainhoa Portillo; Sevilla – Paloma Oliva; Valencia – Isabel Roca

== Official Delegates ==
Province	Candidate	Age
Albacete	Carolina Rodríguez	
Alicante	Maria Ferrer	
Almería	Leonor Rodríguez	
Araba	Ángela Cueva	
Asturias	Rocío Fidalgo	
Ávila	Beatriz Gutiérrez	
Badajoz	Irene Aguilar	
Balearic Islands	Marina Pons	
Barcelona	Marina Fernández	
Cáceres	Carmen Morales	
Cádiz	Maribel Díaz	
Cantabria	Ainara de Santamaría	
Castellón	Sara Cuadros	
Ceuta	Beatriz Ribes	
Ciudad Real	Aisata Diallo	
Córdoba	Marina Salcedo Muñoz	
Cuenca	Marisa Escribano	
Gerona	Paula Cabrera	
Granada	Marta Moreno	
Guadalajara	Sara Moratilla	
Guipúzcoa	Nerea Bengoetxea	
Huelva	Ana Pérez	
Huesca	Nerea Ramirez	
Jaén	Elisa Arboleda	
La Coruña	Maria Rodríguez	
La Rioja	Raquel Boto	
Las Palmas	Elena Macías	
León	Lara Fernández	
Lérida	Verónica Barón	
Lugo	Sara Fernández	
Madrid	Victoria González	
Málaga	Ainhoa Portillo	
Melilla	Paula Pozo	
Murcia	Victoria Martínez	
Navarre	Amaia Izar Leache Larumbe	21
Orense	Natalia Fernández	
Palencia	Ana García	
Pontevedra	Silvia Lorenzo	
Salamanca	Maria García	
Segovia	Isabela Torres	
Sevilla	Paloma Oliva	
Soria	Maria Drake	
Tarragona	Anna Aznar	
Tenerife	Alejandra Rodríguez	
Teruel	Lara Gil	
Toledo	Laura Gómez	
Valencia	Isabel Roca	
Valladolid	Paula Morchón	
Vizcaya	Nerea Redondo	
Zamora	Carmen Mansilla	
Zaragoza	Andrea Cristobal	

== Notes ==
=== Returns ===
Last competed in 2011:

- Ceuta

=== Withdrawals ===
- Burgos
- Canary Islands

=== Did not compete ===
- Aragón
- Galicia
