= Agüimes =

- Municipality
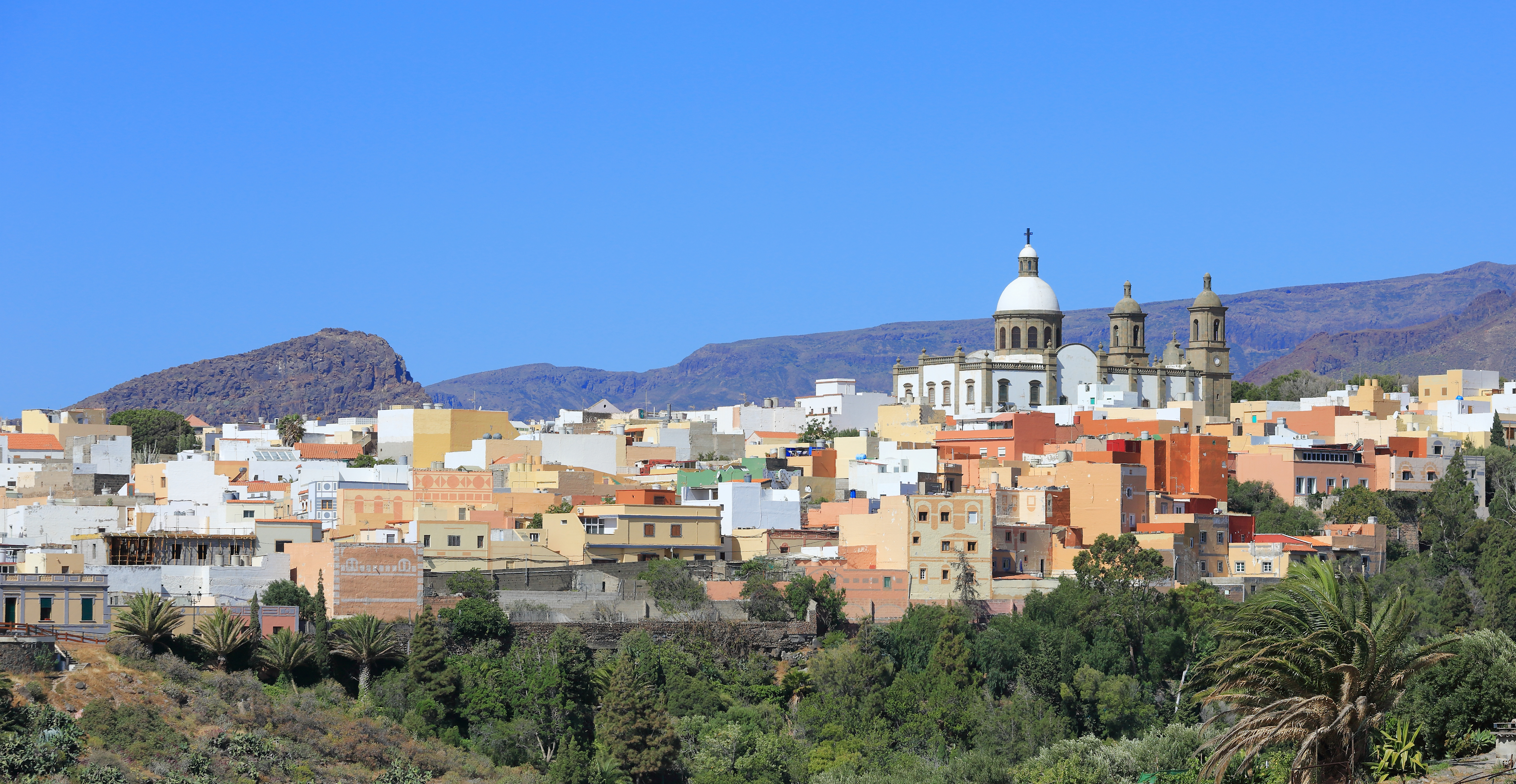
- Panorama of Agüimes

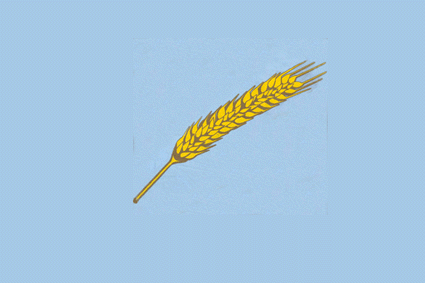
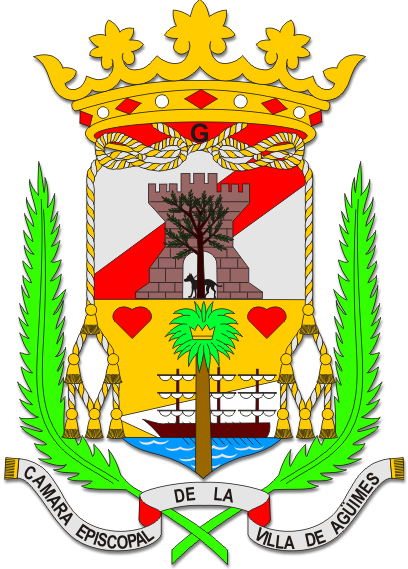
- Flag Coat of arms

- Municipal location in Gran Canaria

- Location in the province of Las Palmas Agüimes (Canary Islands) Agüimes (Spain, Canary Islands)
- Coordinates: 27°54′N 15°27′W
- Country: Spain
- Autonomous Region: Canary Islands
- Province: Las Palmas
- Island: Gran Canaria

Area
  - Total: 79.28 km^{2} (30.61 sq mi)
- Elevation: 275 m (902 ft)

Population (2025-01-01)
  - Total: 33,800
  - Density: 426/km^{2} (1,100/sq mi)
- Time zone: UTC+0 (GMT)
- Climate: BWh
- Website: www.aguimes.es

Agüimes is a Spanish town and municipality in the eastern part of the island of Gran Canaria in the Las Palmas province in the Canary Islands.

== Presentation ==
Agüimes is situated 5 km from the coast, and 26 km south of the island capital Las Palmas. The GC-1 motorway passes east of the town.

The population is 30,214 (2013), and the area is 79.28 km^{2} (30.61 sq mi). The elevation is 275 m.

== Evolution of the population ==
Year	Population
1991	16,156
1996	18,284
2001	20,124
2002	22,567
2003	23,572
2004	24,460
2013	30,214

== Climate ==
Climate data for Agüimes, Las Palmas (altitude 150 m, data of 1953-1965)
Month	Jan	Feb	Mar	Apr	May	Jun	Jul	Aug	Sep	Oct	Nov	Dec	Year
Mean daily maximum °C (°F)	18.5 (65.3)	19.4 (66.9)	20.8 (69.4)	21.0 (69.8)	23.0 (73.4)	24.0 (75.2)	27.4 (81.3)	27.3 (81.1)	25.8 (78.4)	24.1 (75.4)	21.2 (70.2)	18.8 (65.8)	22.6 (72.7)
Daily mean °C (°F)	14.8 (58.6)	15.2 (59.4)	16.3 (61.3)	16.5 (61.7)	18.4 (65.1)	19.2 (66.6)	22.6 (72.7)	22.4 (72.3)	21.6 (70.9)	20.2 (68.4)	17.7 (63.9)	15.4 (59.7)	18.4 (65.1)
Mean daily minimum °C (°F)	11.1 (52.0)	11.0 (51.8)	11.8 (53.2)	12.0 (53.6)	13.9 (57.0)	14.5 (58.1)	17.8 (64.0)	17.6 (63.7)	17.4 (63.3)	16.4 (61.5)	14.1 (57.4)	12.0 (53.6)	14.1 (57.4)
Average precipitation mm (inches)	41 (1.6)	37 (1.5)	11 (0.4)	5 (0.2)	4 (0.2)	1 (0.0)	0 (0)	0 (0)	7 (0.3)	32 (1.3)	89 (3.5)	62 (2.4)	289 (11.4)
Source: Worldwide Bioclimatic Classification System

== Economy ==
The major growth of the last few years has been the creation of a huge industrial estate on flat land once covered by tomato plantations. This has brought new jobs and industries into the area and has spurred the development of a new purpose-built port which is due to open in 2007.

== Tourism ==
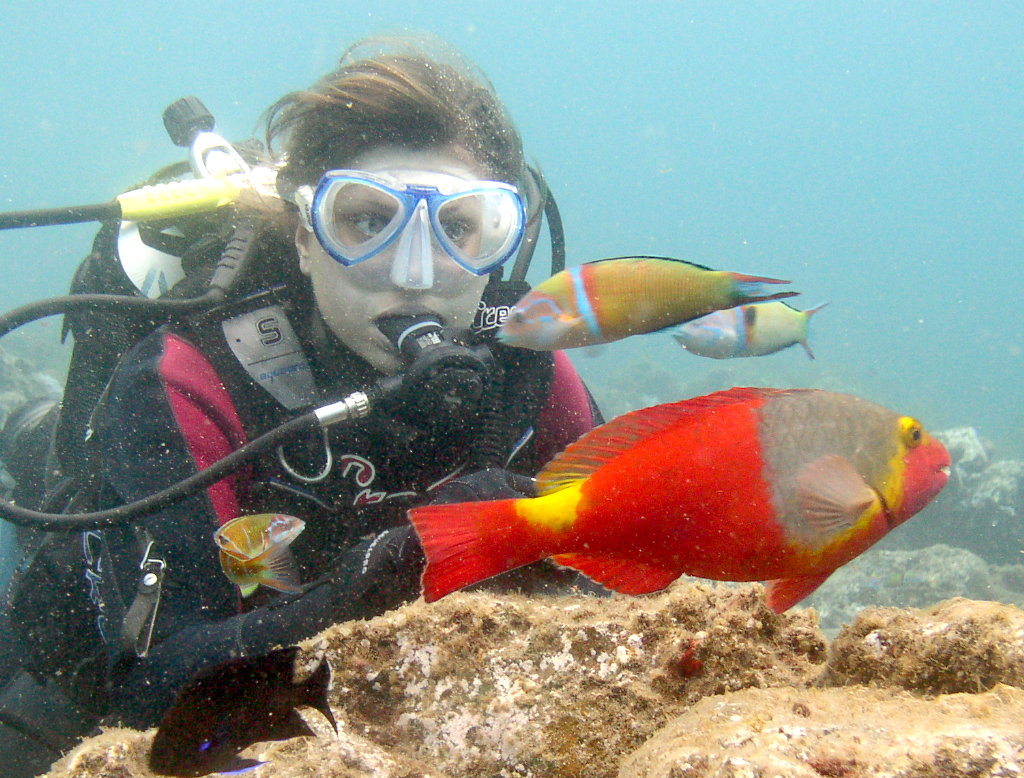
A diver watches a parrotfish and a Turkish wrasse (Thalassoma Pavo) while scuba diving in the El Cabrón marine reserve, Gran Canaria.

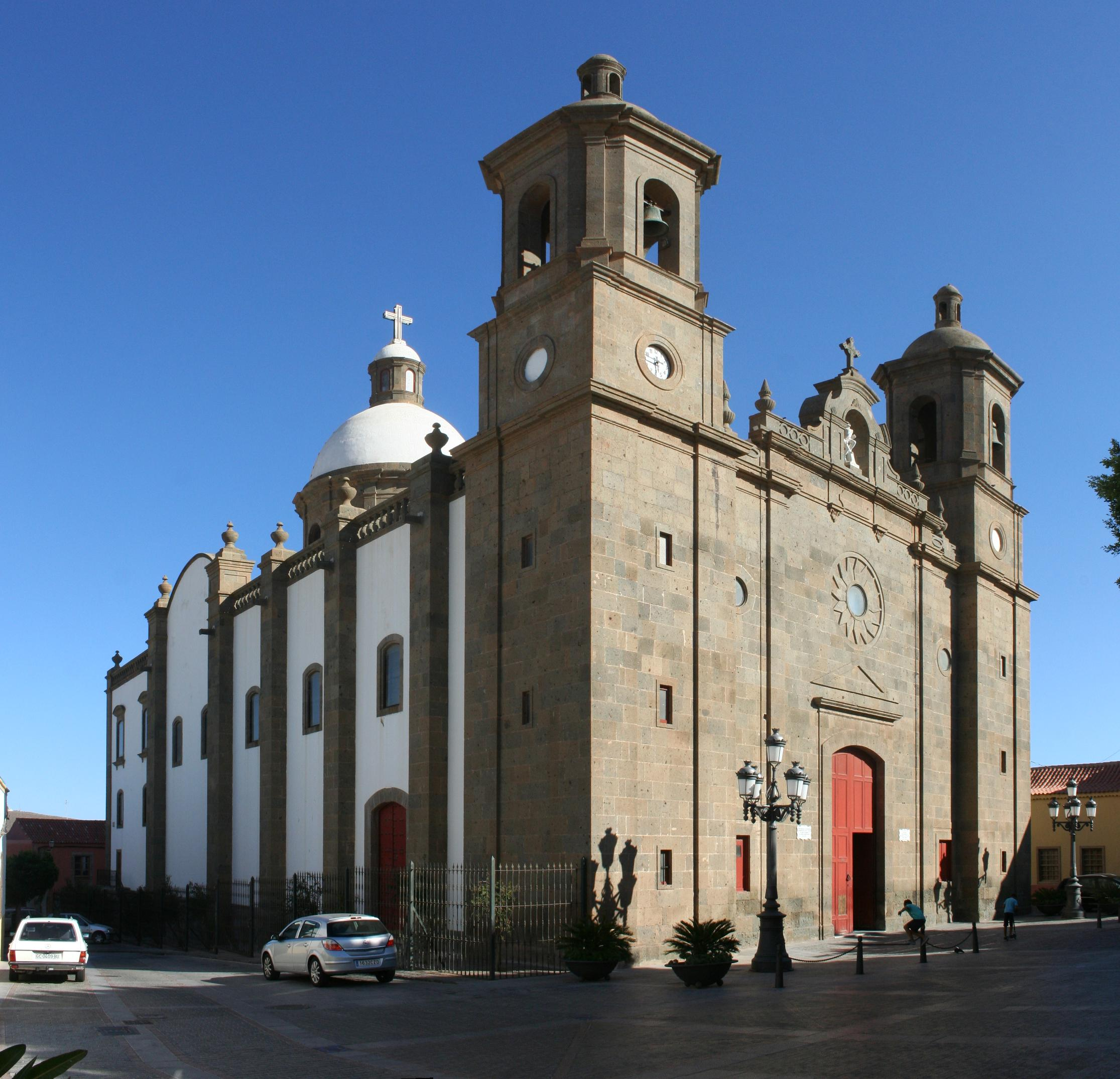
Templo Parroquial de San Sebastián

The district was not at one time a major tourist destination, but after the careful restoration of the old town, this has become the best example of a traditional Canarian hill town. The streets of the old town exude a gentle, relaxed, timeless atmosphere, and the carefully positioned street statues and sculptures add a series of surprises to a visit to the old town. The local plan for 'rural tourism' has led to the development of other small visitor centres on the district, the biggest of which is in the Guayadeque ravine. This area has many cave houses dating back hundreds of years, and a complete village excavated into the hillside, still occupied today, with its own cave chapel, cave bar and cave restaurants.

The Temisas Astronomical Observatory, on Montaña de Arriba near Temisas, is a popular visitor attraction, offering regular events related to astronomy.

== Sports ==
Sporting activities are also very important in the area, with its windsurfing and scuba diving recognized as "world-class". The windsurfing world cup at Pozo Izquierdo is an important event on the PWA World Tour. The whole of the coast in this area can provide challenging windsurfing conditions at any time of the year.

The main area for scuba diving in Gran Canaria is in the area known as the 'El Cabrón' marine reserve, next to the town of Arinaga. The diving in this area includes caves, arches, walls and volcanic reefs where an extremely wide range of sub-tropical marine species can be found, from tiny seahorses up to rays and angel sharks.

== Heritage sites ==
In the centre of the town, the large, domed Church of San Sebastián in Plaza Nuestra Señora del Rosario is a noted example of Canarian Neoclassical architecture. Construction of the church started in 1796 and it was only completed in 1940.

Twenty-three kilometres (14 miles) south-west of Agüimes on the south coast of the island there stands a full-scale replica of the San Sebastián Church. It was erected in 2014 by the hotelier Eustasio López González, who originated from Agüimes, as part of a luxury hotel complex, the Lopesan Costa Meloneras Hotel in Maspalomas. The hotel consists of buildings designed in a Canarian Spanish Colonial Revival style to recreate the historic environment of Agüimes, including a copy of the church.

The Agüimes municipality's territory is rich in historical sites, among which the El Maipés necropolis in Agaete is a well-known site. The caves and granaries of the Audience site in Temisas and the caves and hillocks in Avila have been declared Sites of cultural interest in 2016.

== Gallery ==
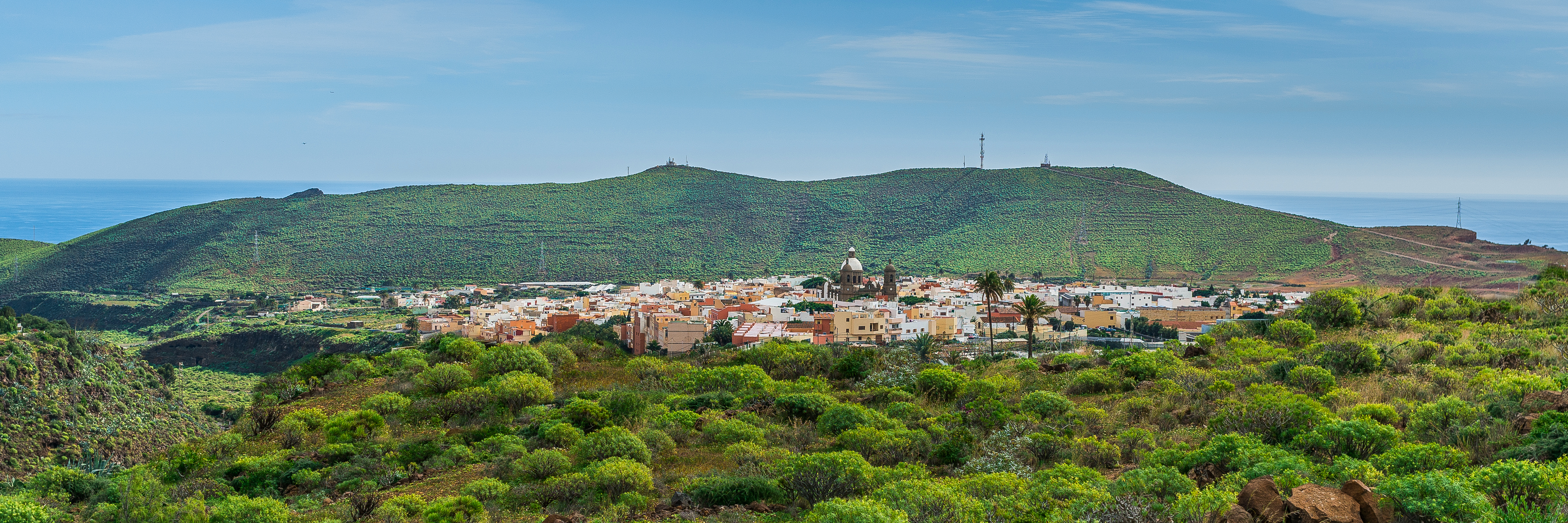
Aguimes 2016

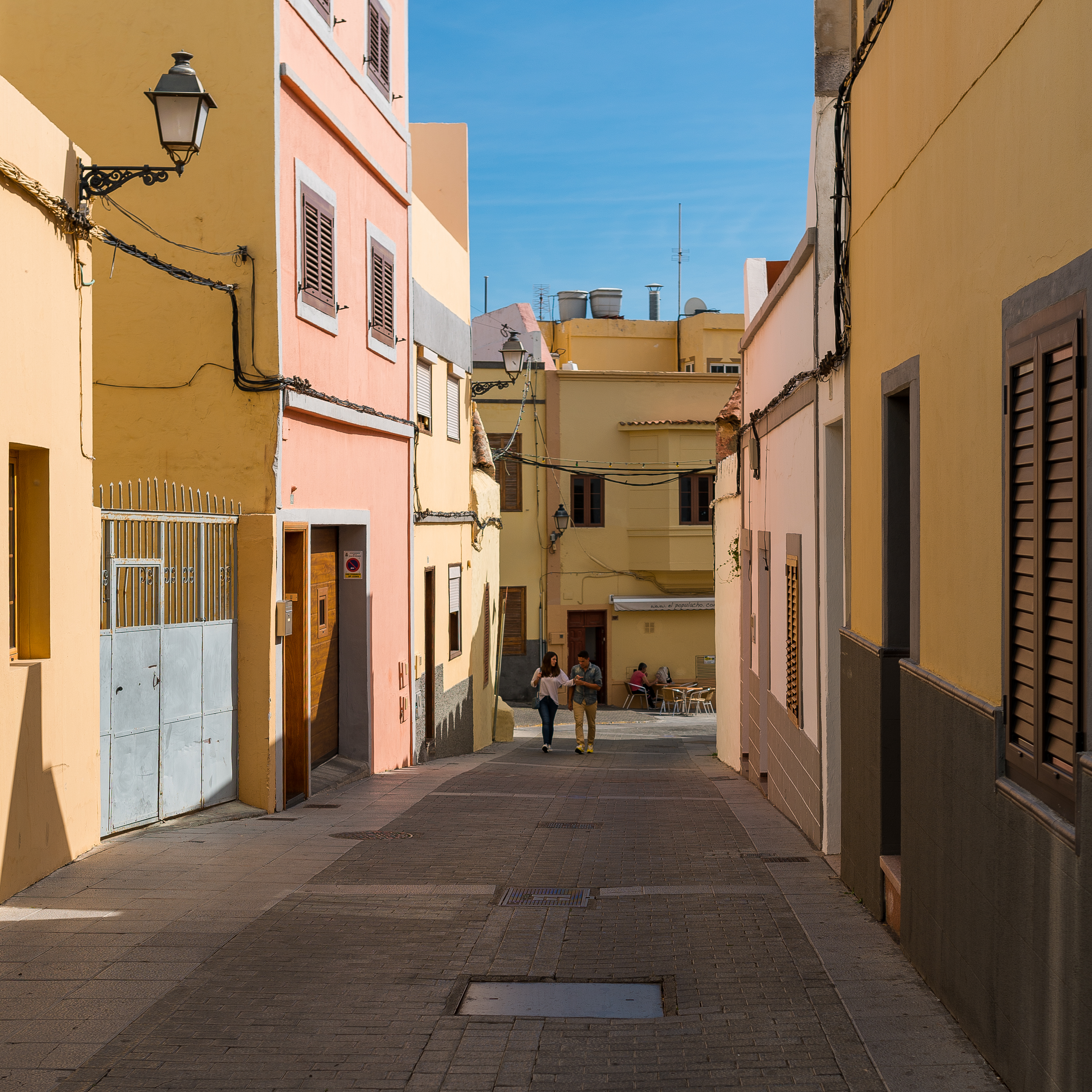
Aguimes 2016

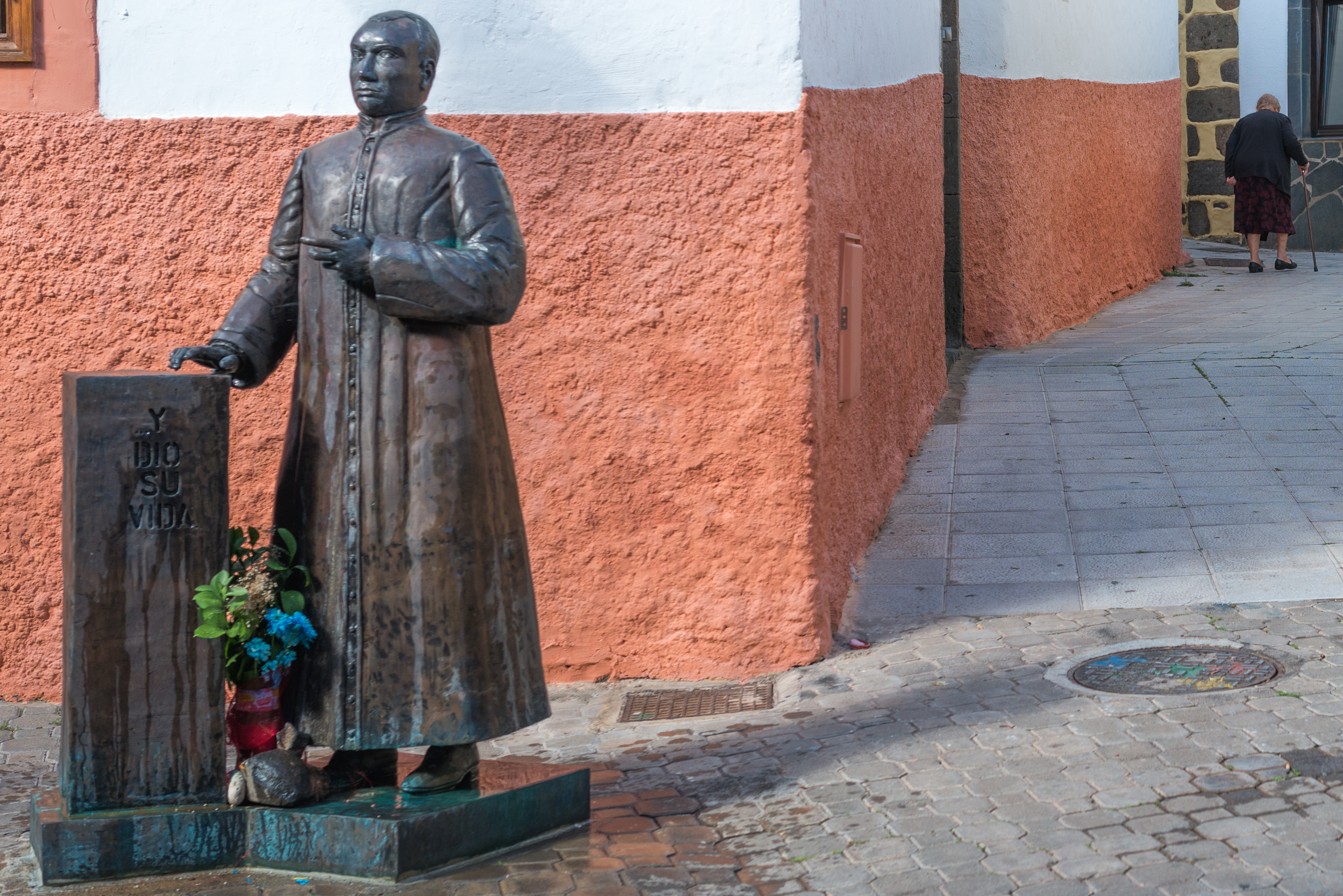
Aguimes 2016

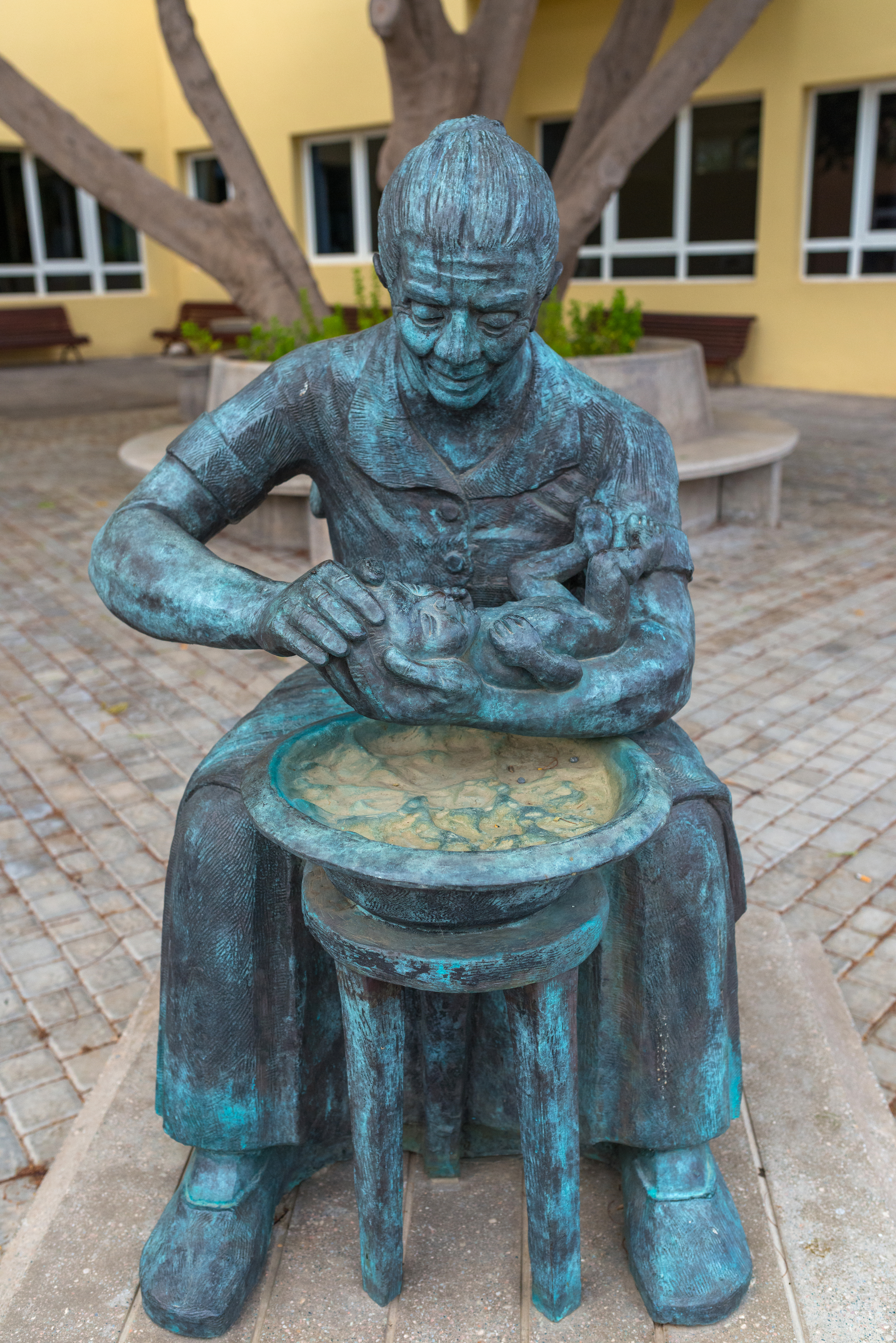
Aguimes 2016

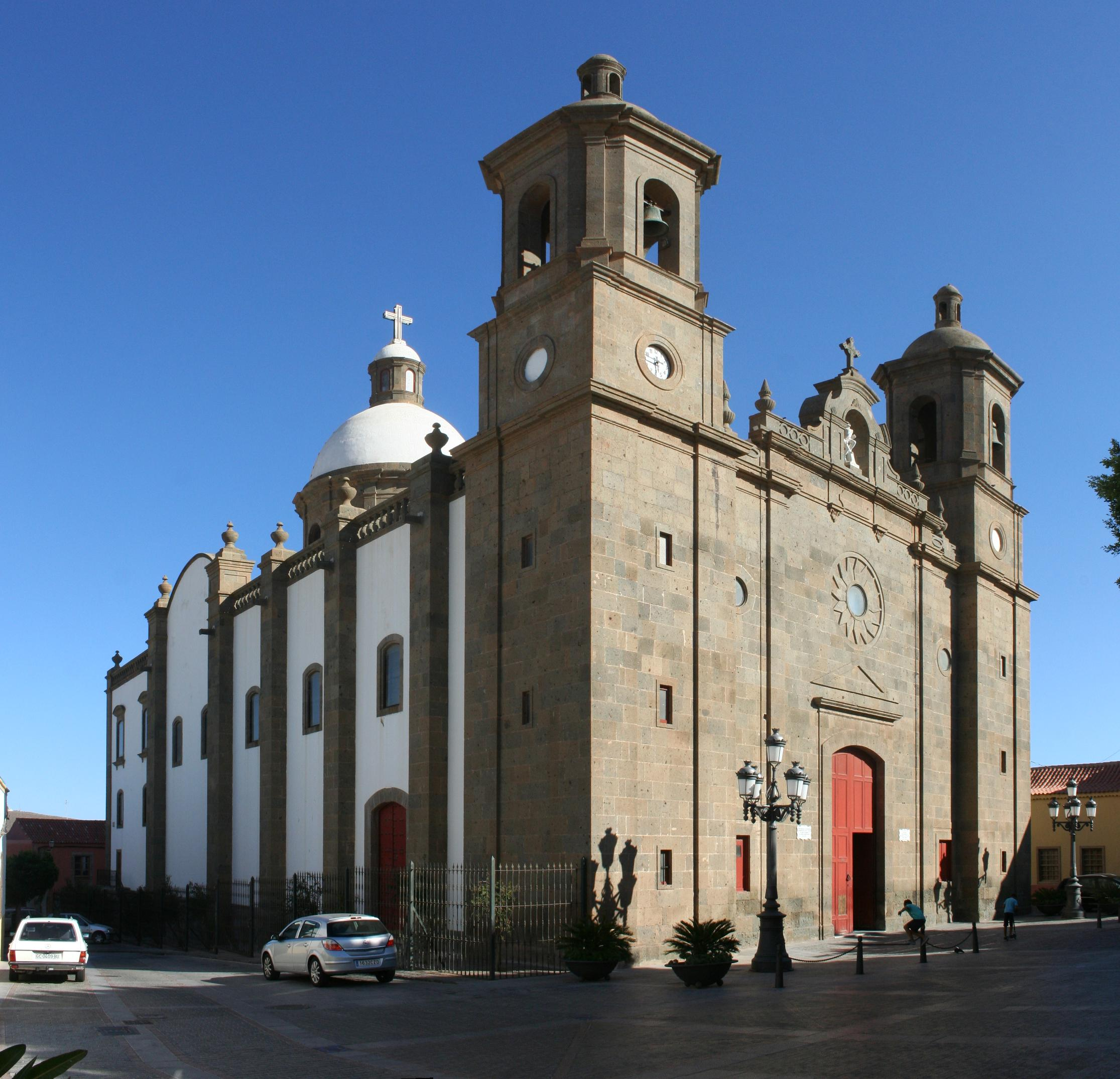
Templo Parroquial de San Sebastián

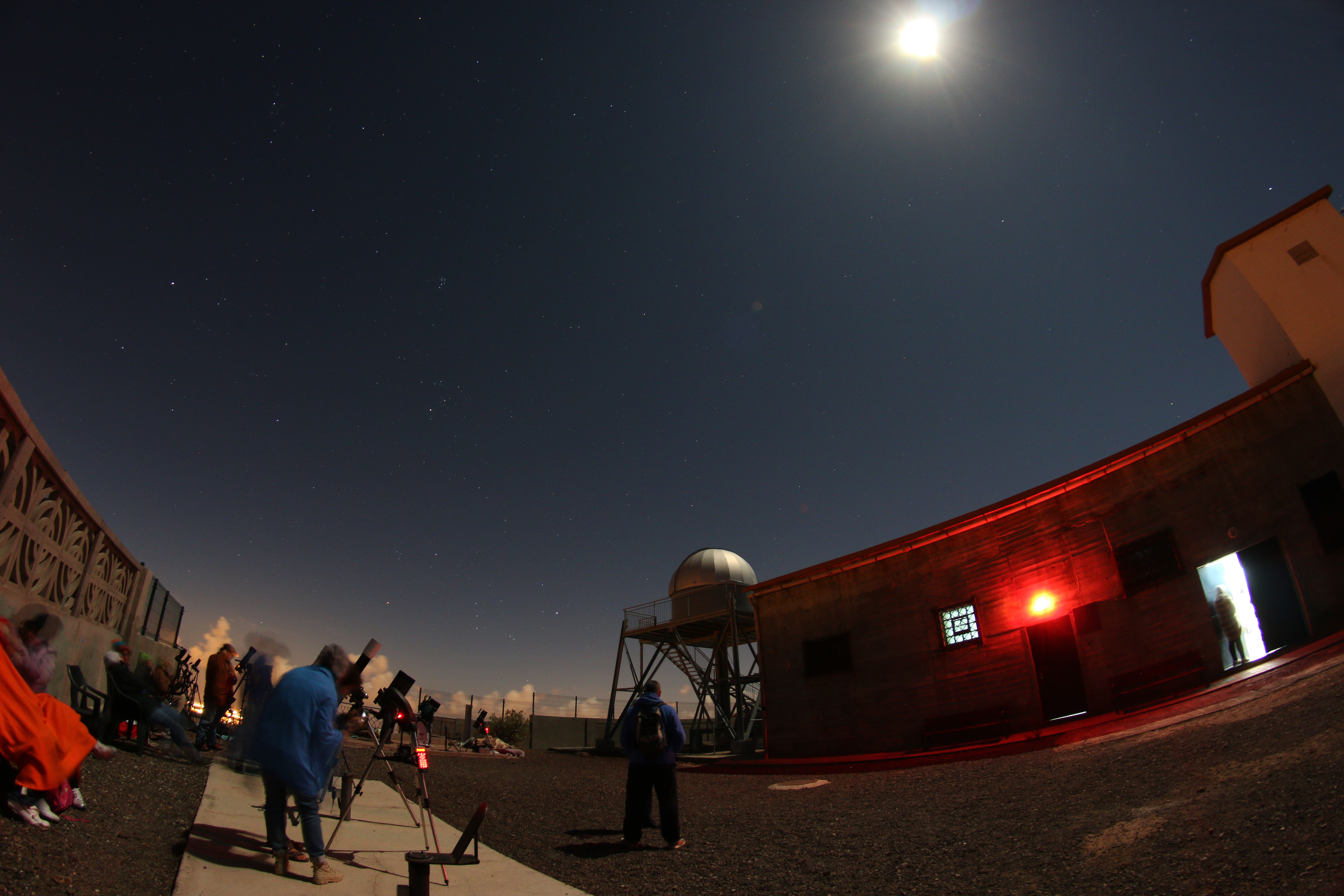
The Temisas Observatory

== See also ==
- List of municipalities in Las Palmas
