= Andrea Huisgen =

German-Spanish model and former Miss Spain

- Born: Andrea Huisgen Serrano; 22 June 1990 (age 36); Barcelona, Spain
- Height: 1.81 m (5 ft 11 in)
- Beauty pageant titleholder
- Title: Miss España 2011
- Hair color: Brown
- Eye color: Brown
- Major competitions: Miss España 2011 (Winner); Miss Universe 2012 (Unplaced)

Andrea Huisgen Serrano (born 22 June 1990) is a German-Spanish model and beauty pageant titleholder who was crowned Miss España 2011, the official representative to Miss Universe 2012. Andrea studied Law and works as a model in Barcelona. Born to a Spanish mother and a German father, she speaks German, English, and French in addition to Spanish and Catalan.

== Miss España 2011 ==
Miss Barcelona, Andrea Huisgen Serrano has been crowned Miss España 2011 (Miss Spain 2011) by Paula Guilló Sempere, Miss Spain 2010, at the 51st edition of the Miss Spain beauty pageant held at the Palacio de Los Sueños in Seville on 27 November 2011. Huisgen was the last Miss España crowned before the Spanish beauty contest went bankrupt.

Awards and achievements
| Preceded by Paula Guilló | Miss Spain; 2011 | Succeeded by Patricia Yurena Rodríguez |
