= Paula Guilló =

Spanish beauty queen (born 1989)

- Born: Paula Guilló Sempere; 6 July 1989 (age 37); Elche, Spain
- Height: 1.81 m (5 ft 11 1/2 in)
- Beauty pageant titleholder
- Title: Miss España 2010
- Hair color: Brown
- Eye color: Blue
- Major competitions: Miss España 2010 (Winner)

Paula Guilló Sempere (born 6 July 1989) is a Spanish model and beauty pageant titleholder who was crowned Miss España 2010, the official representative to Miss Universe 2011, on 25 September at a gala event in the city hall square of Toledo, Spain.

== Miss Spain ==
Born in Elche, Guilló was crowned by María José Ulla, Miss Spain 1964, breaking the tradition of being crowned by the former titleholder, in this case Estíbaliz Pereira, Miss Spain 2009.

Awards and achievements
Preceded by Estíbaliz Pereira	Miss España; 2010	Succeeded by Andrea Huisgen
Preceded by Adriana Reverón	Miss Universe Spain; 2011	Succeeded by Andrea Huisgen
