= Miss Spain 2010 =

- Date: September 25, 2010
- Presenters: Luis Muñoz; Vanesa Romero
- Venue: Plaza del Ayuntamiento, Toledo
- Entrants: 52
- Placements: 20
- Winner: Paula Guilló; Teruel

Miss Spain 2010 is the 50th edition of the beauty pageant Miss Spain. The pageant was held in Toledo on September 25. There were 52 contestants representing each provinces of Spain.

Paula Guilló from Teruel won the competition and represented Spain in Miss Universe 2011.

First runner-up will represent the country in Miss World 2011. The rest of the Top 6 was represented Spain in Miss International 2011, Reina Hispanoamericana 2011 and Reinado Internacional del Café 2011 and other pageants. Miss Spain 2010 contestants wore Alyce Paris Designs gowns.

== Results ==
=== Placements ===
Placement	Contestant
Miss Spain 2010	Teruel – Paula Guilló
1st Runner-Up	Las Palmas – Carla Barber García
2nd Runner-Up	Bizkaia – Eugenia Celia Calvo
3rd Runner-Up	Sevilla – Jéssica Bueno Cabeza de Vaca
4th Runner-Up	A Coruña – Sarah López Bujía
5th Runner-Up	Tenerife – Amanda Perdomo
Top 15	Badajoz – Yenifer Solís; Cantabria – Silvia López; Ceuta – Mirem Mustafa; Córdoba – Nazareth Mesa; Cuenca – Patricia Pastor; Illes Balears – Verónica Hernández; León – Vanessa Fernández; Lleida – Alba Fortes; Murcia – Belén Matas
