= Šmartno pri Litiji =

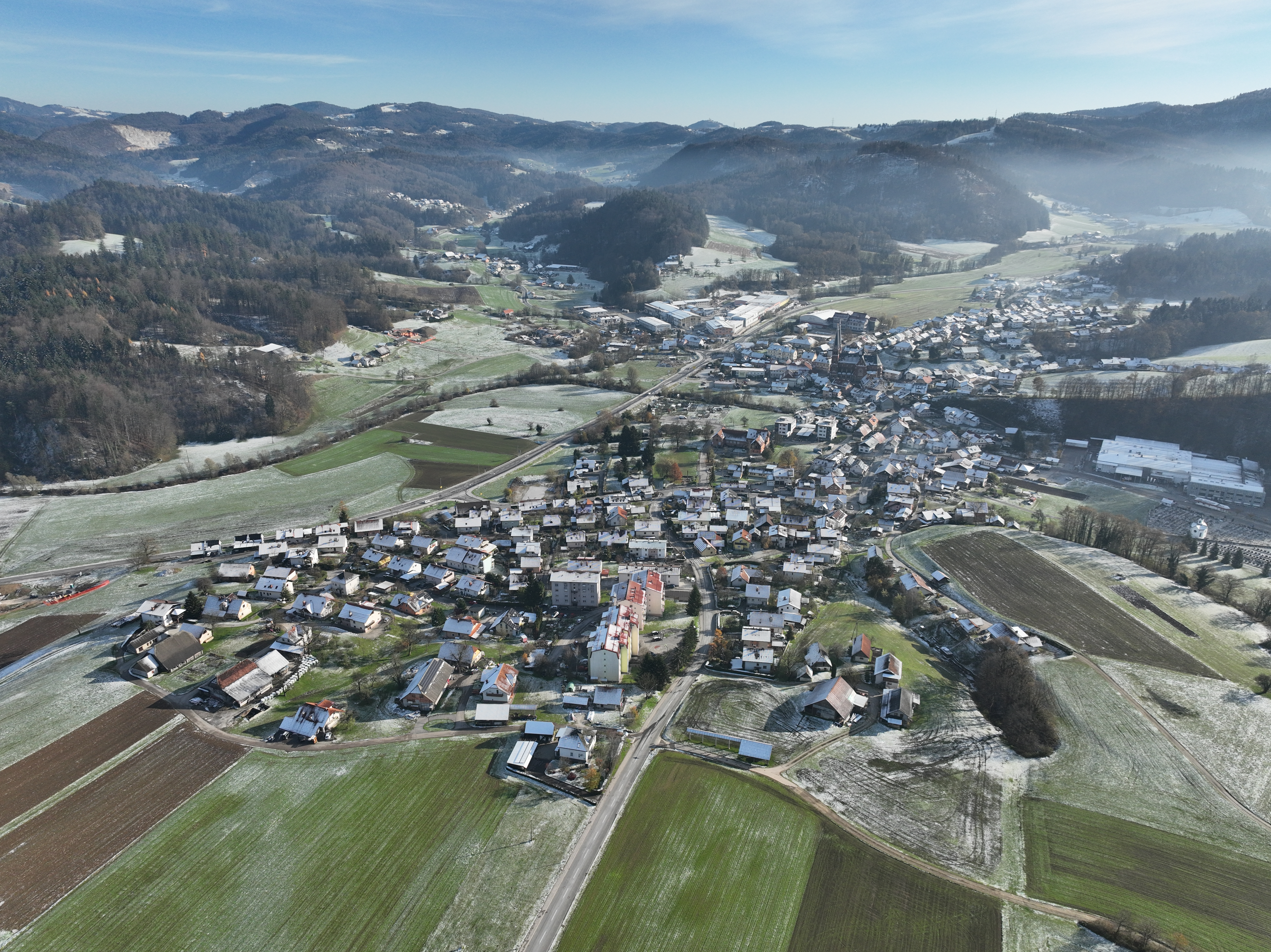

- Location in Slovenia
- Coordinates: 46°02′38.7″N 14°50′47.89″E
- Country: Slovenia
- Traditional region: Lower Carniola
- Statistical region: Central Slovenia
- Municipality: Šmartno pri Litiji

Area
  - Total: 2.6 km^{2} (1.0 sq mi)
- Elevation: 245.8 m (806 ft)

Population (2017)
  - Total: 1,395

Šmartno pri Litiji (pronounced [ˈʃmaːɾtnɔ pɾi liˈtiːji]; German: Sankt Martin) is a town in the Litija Basin in central Slovenia. It is part of the traditional region of Lower Carniola and is now included in the Central Slovenia Statistical Region. It is the seat of the Municipality of Šmartno pri Litiji. The town is located 3 km southeast of Litija at the confluence of three creeks: Reka Creek, Black Creek (Slovene: Črni potok), and Kostrevnica Creek (Slovene: Kostrevniški potok). The town of Litija outgrew the formerly more important Šmartno when the Austrian Southern Railway was routed through Litija. The name of the settlement was first attested in ecclesiastical documents from 1135, although the area was already settled in prehistoric times. The oldest house in Šmartno pri Litiji bears the year 1580, and in the 17th century the Mollerey painting and graphic arts workshop operated in it. The town includes the hamlet of Slatina (in older sources also Slatna, German: Slatenegg).

== Church ==
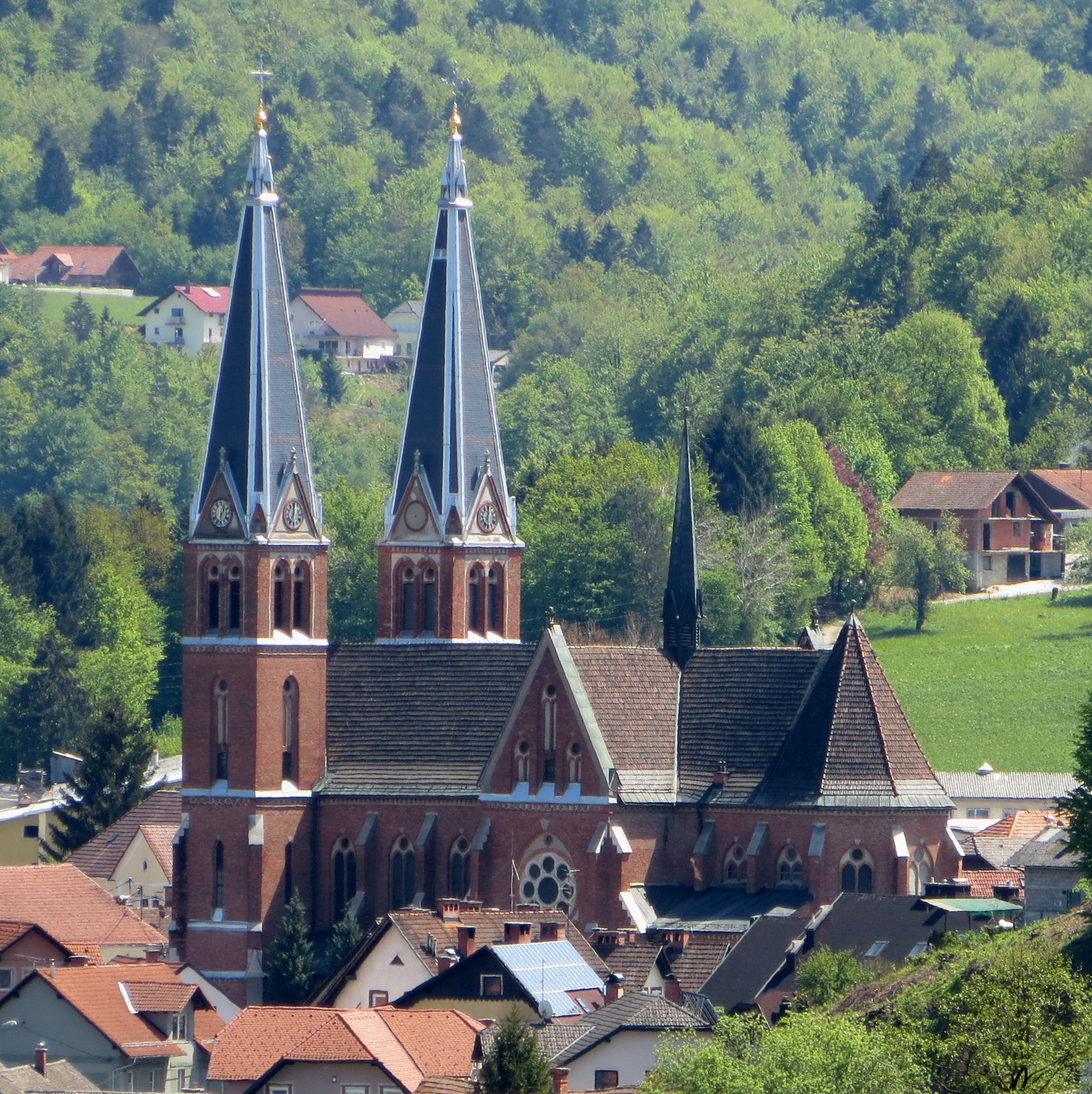
St. Martin's Church

The center of the town is dominated by the neo-Gothic church dedicated to Saint Martin, from which the settlement gets its name (Šent Martin > Šmartno). It belongs to the Roman Catholic Archdiocese of Ljubljana. The church was designed by the architect Adolf Wagner, and was built between 1899 and 1901 on the site of an earlier church mentioned in written documents dating to 1363. The interior of the church is illuminated by light coming through stained-glass windows designed by Anton Jebačin. According to a legend, the church was built on the place where trapped miners in Šmartno were once rescued on Martinmas.
