= A. arvensis =

A. arvensis may refer to:

An abbreviation of a species name. In binomial nomenclature the name of a species is always the name of the genus to which the species belongs, followed by the species name (also called the species epithet). In A. arvensis the genus name has been abbreviated to A. and the species has been spelled out in full. In a document that uses this abbreviation it should always be clear from the context which genus name has been abbreviated.

Some of the most common uses of A. arvensis are:

- Acinos arvensis, a synonym of Clinopodium acinos, the basil thyme
- Agaricus arvensis, the horse mushroom
- Alauda arvensis, the skylark, a small passerine bird species
- Alchemilla arvensis, the field parsley-piert, the western lady's-mantle, the parsley breakstone
- Anagallis arvensis, the scarlet pimpernel or red pimpernel, red chickweed, poorman's barometer, shepherd's weather glass
- Anchusa arvensis, the small bugloss and annual bugloss
- Anthemis arvensis, the corn chamomile or mayweed, scentless chamomile and field chamomile, anthémis des champs

== See also ==
- Arvensis (disambiguation)
