= V. arvensis =

V. arvensis may refer to:

- Veronica arvensis, the corn speedwell, common speedwell, speedwell, rock Speedwell, wall Speedwell, a medicinal plant species and a noxious weed
- Viola arvensis, the field pansy, a flowering plant species

== See also ==
- Arvensis (disambiguation)
