= B. arvensis =

B. arvensis may refer to:

- Bromus arvensis, the field brome, a grass species native to Europe and Asia
- Buglossoides arvensis, a synonym for Lithospermum arvense

== See also ==
- Arvensis (disambiguation)
