= M. arvensis =

M. arvensis may refer to:

- Mentha arvensis, the field mint, the wild mint or the corn mint, a plant species with a circumboreal distribution
- Myosotis arvensis, the field forget-me-not, a herbaceous annual plant species

== See also ==
- Arvensis (disambiguation)
