= S. arvensis =

S. arvensis may refer to:

- Sherardia arvensis, the field madder, a flowering plant species
- Sinapis arvensis, the wild mustard or charlock, a plant species
- Sonchus arvensis, the corn sow thistle, dindle, field sow thistle, gutweed, swine thistle, tree sow thistle or field sowthistle, a plant species
- Spergula arvensis, the corn spurry

== See also ==
- Arvensis (disambiguation)
