= Jesuit Pharmacy in Grodno =

Pharmacy in Belarus

Coordinates: 53.6785°N 23.8313°E

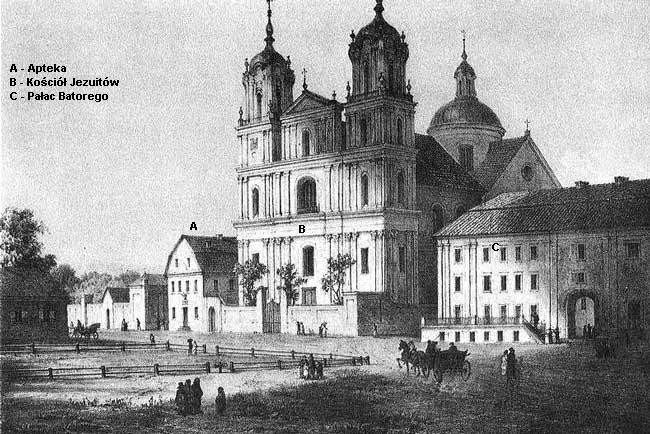
- Grodno square in mid-19th century by Napoleon Orda. Centre: Jesuit Church. Right: Palace of King Stephen Báthory. Left (behind church): Jesuit Pharmacy.
- Interactive map of the Jesuit Pharmacy in Grodno area

General information
- Groundbreaking: 1700
- Opened: 1709

The Jesuit Pharmacy in Grodno (Belarusian: Гродзенская аптэка Езуітаў, romanized: Hrodzienskaja apteka Jezuitaŭ, Polish: Apteka jezuicka w Grodnie) is a pharmacy built in the market square in Grodno, then in the Polish–Lithuanian Commonwealth, between 1700 and 1709. It is the oldest pharmacy in present-day Belarus.

The pharmacy was located within the complex of the Jesuit Monastery in Grodno, a monument of history and culture of the 18th century, which occupies a large area in the central part of the city. The Jesuits opened the pharmacy in 1709. After their suppression, it was managed by the Polish Commission of National Education. The pharmacy continued its operations despite wars, upheavals and changes of ownership until 1950. A modern pharmacy and a museum of pharmacology were opened in 1996.

== History ==
In the 18th century, the pharmacy building belonged to the Medical Academy of Grodno (Медыцынскай акадэміі), the first institution of higher education in the territory of modern Belarus. There worked the famous French botanist professor Jean-Emmanuel Gilibert who is considered as the founder of pharmaceutical sciences in Belarus and Lithuania.

The second floor of the pharmacy was probably built in the 1760s because archival documents of 1772 mentioned that the second floor was built recently. The expanded pharmacy and the monastery was captured in a mid-19th-century watercolor by Napoleon Orda.

In the 19th century, the pharmacy was owned by public figures such as Ivan Adamovich and Casimir Stafanovski, who opened the first pharmacy branch of the Red Cross, and Edward Stampevski, mayor of Grodno in 1922–27.

=== Present day ===
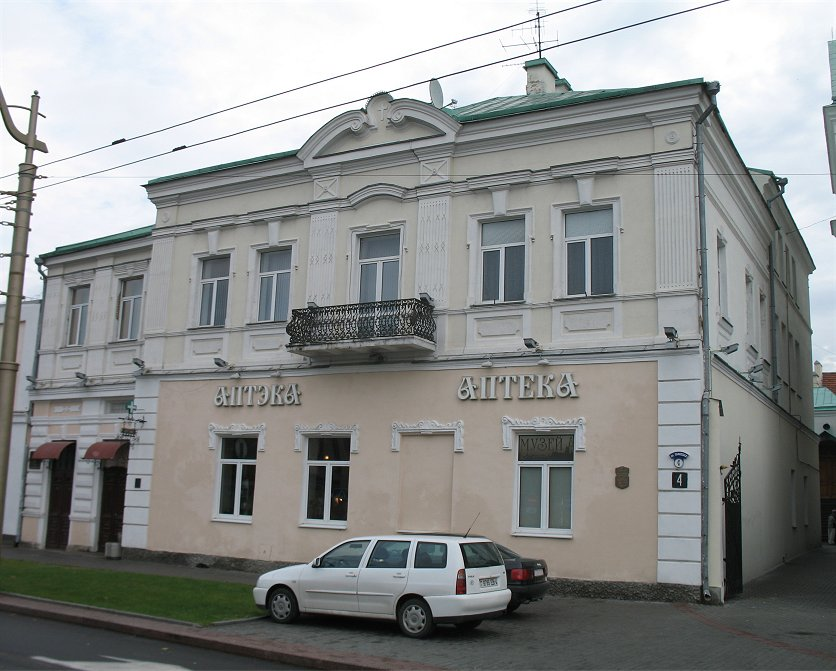
Pharmacy Museum today

The Jesuit pharmacy resumed its activities in 1996, when cooperative "Biotest" rented and rebuilt it. The old rooms have decorated vaulted ceilings. There are halls: drugstore, museum exhibition, and herbal store. The sales room offers more than 5,000 modern domestic and imported drugs and medical devices for sale. The second hall is the museum exhibition devoted to the history and development of the Grodno pharmacy and pharmacy business in Belarus. The first museum exhibition was created with the help of the citizens and lasted until 2004. The museum displays six stylized herbariums made by famous Polish writer and resident of Grodno Eliza Orzeszkowa. One of the sections of the exhibition is devoted to medical instruments used for the autopsy of King Stefan Batory after his sudden death in Grodno. The last hall is the herbal room which offers tinctures, teas, toiletries, cosmetics and supplements made from medicinal plants.
