= T. arvense =

T. arvense may refer to:

- Thlaspi arvense, the field penny-cress, a foetid Eurasian plant species naturalized throughout North America
- Trifolium arvense the haresfoot clover, a clover species

== See also ==
- Arvense (disambiguation)
