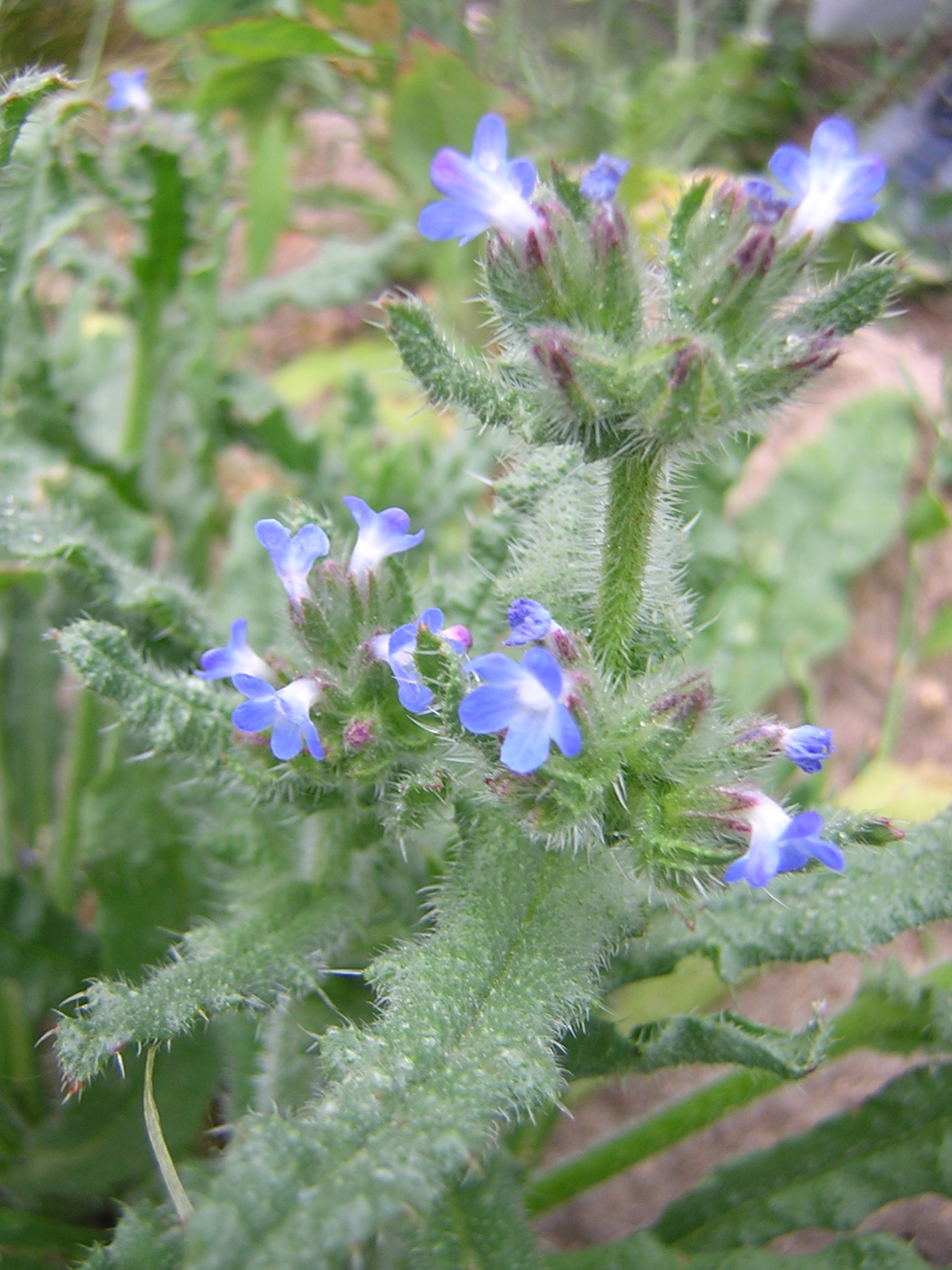

Conservation status
- Near Threatened (IUCN 3.1)

Scientific classification
- Kingdom: Plantae
- Clade: Tracheophytes
- Clade: Angiosperms
- Clade: Eudicots
- Clade: Asterids
- Order: Boraginales
- Family: Boraginaceae
- Genus: Anchusa
- Species: A. arvensis

Binomial name
- Anchusa arvensis (L.) M.Bieb.

Synonyms
- Anchusa arvensis subsp. occidentalis (Kusn.) Nordh.; Anchusa arvensis var stricta Boenn.; Anchusa lateriflora Dumort.; Buglossa arvensis (L.) Gray; Buglossites arvensis (L.) Bubani; Echioides arvensis Poir. ex Steud.; Lycopsis arvensis (L.); Lycopsis arvensis subsp. occidentalis Kusn.; Lycopsis orientalis Stephan; Lycopsis undulata Gilib.; Nonea arvensis DC. ex Steud.

= Anchusa arvensis =

Species of flowering plant

Anchusa arvensis is a species of flowering plant in the borage family Boraginaceae. Its common names include bugloss, small bugloss, annual bugloss, and field bugloss. It was first described by Carl Linnaeus, and given its exact name by Friedrich Bieberstein in Flora Taurico-Caucasica.

== Description ==
This is a coarsely hairy annual herb which may reach half a meter in height. It bears small blue tubular flowers, four nutlets per flower, and one seed per nutlet. Leaves are very bristly and warty-looking, which differentiates it from similar species like Pentaglottis sempervirens and Myosotis arvensis.

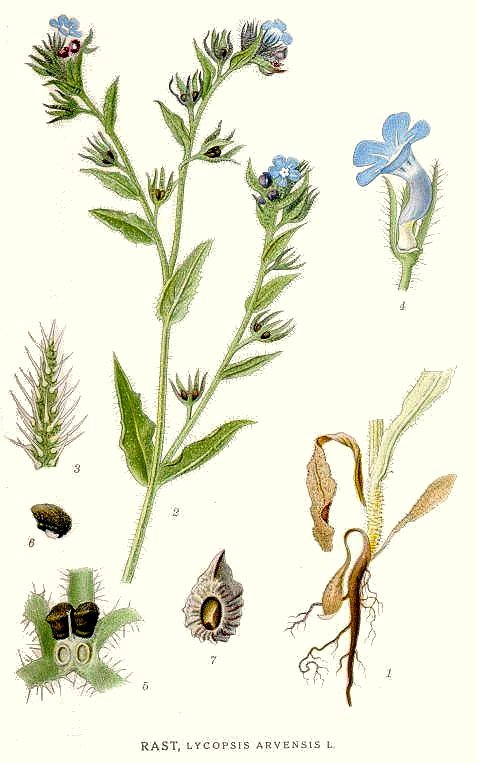
A. arvensis technical drawing.

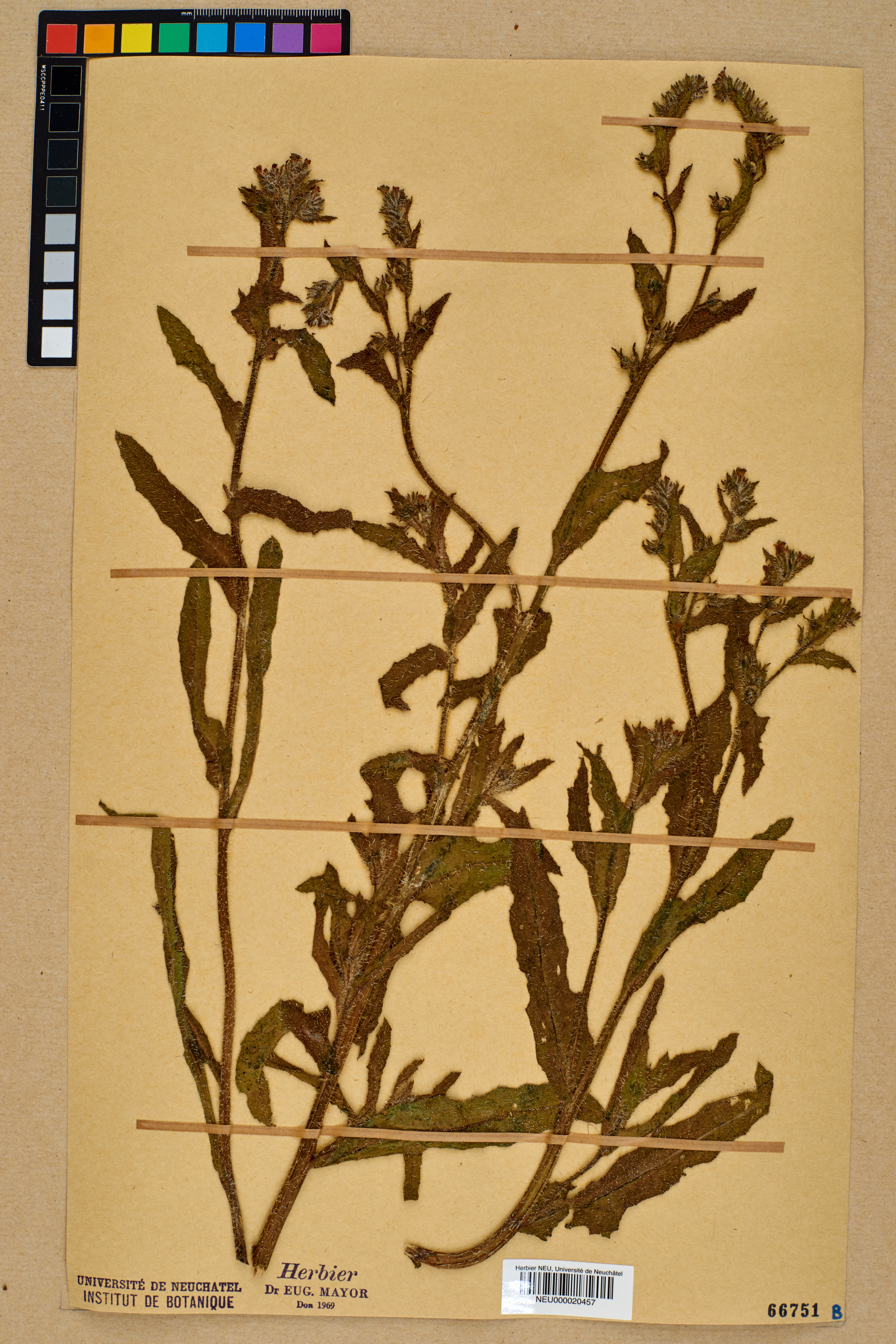
A. arvensis in Neuchâtel's herbarium.

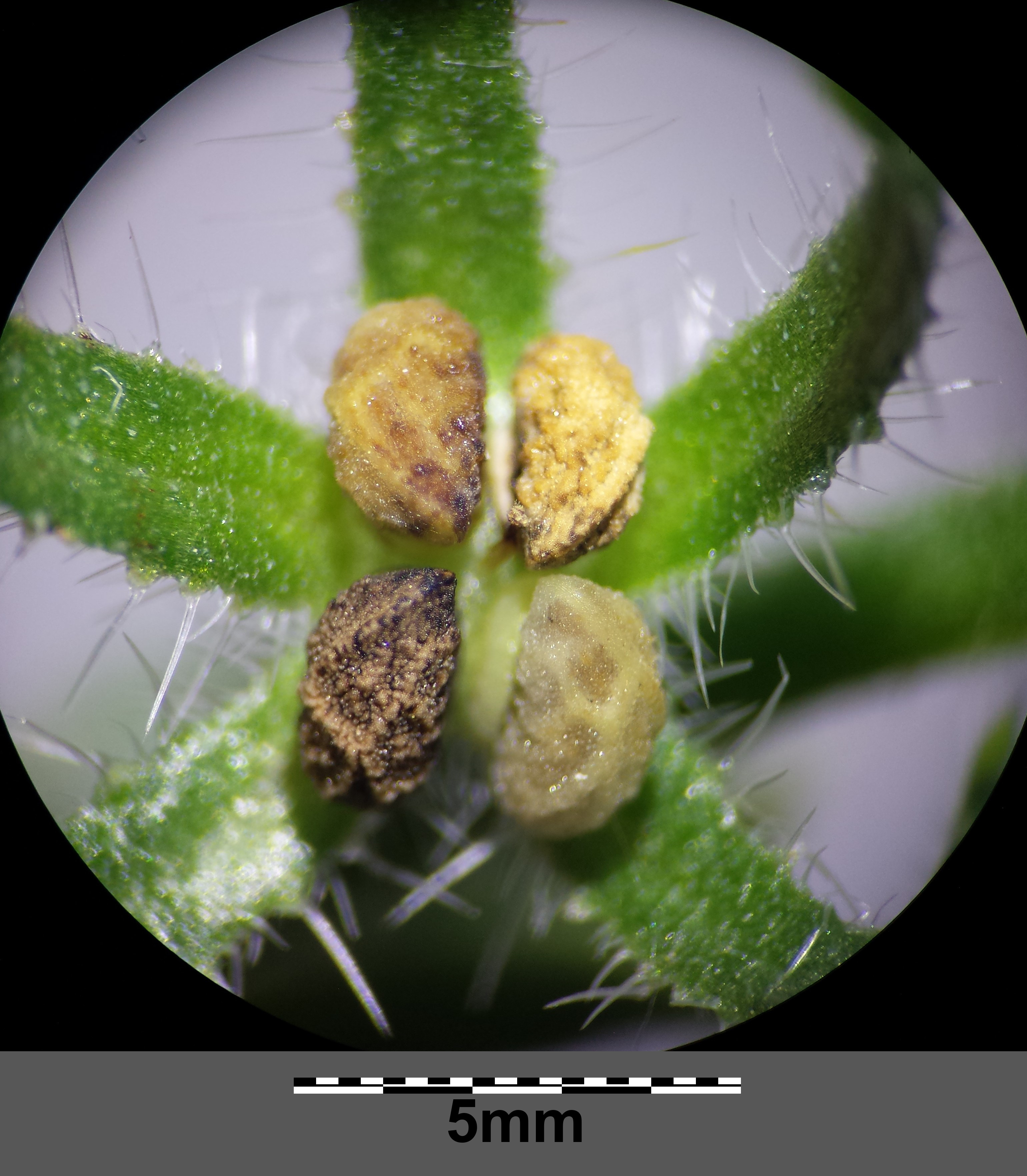
A. arvensis peduncle with nutlets.

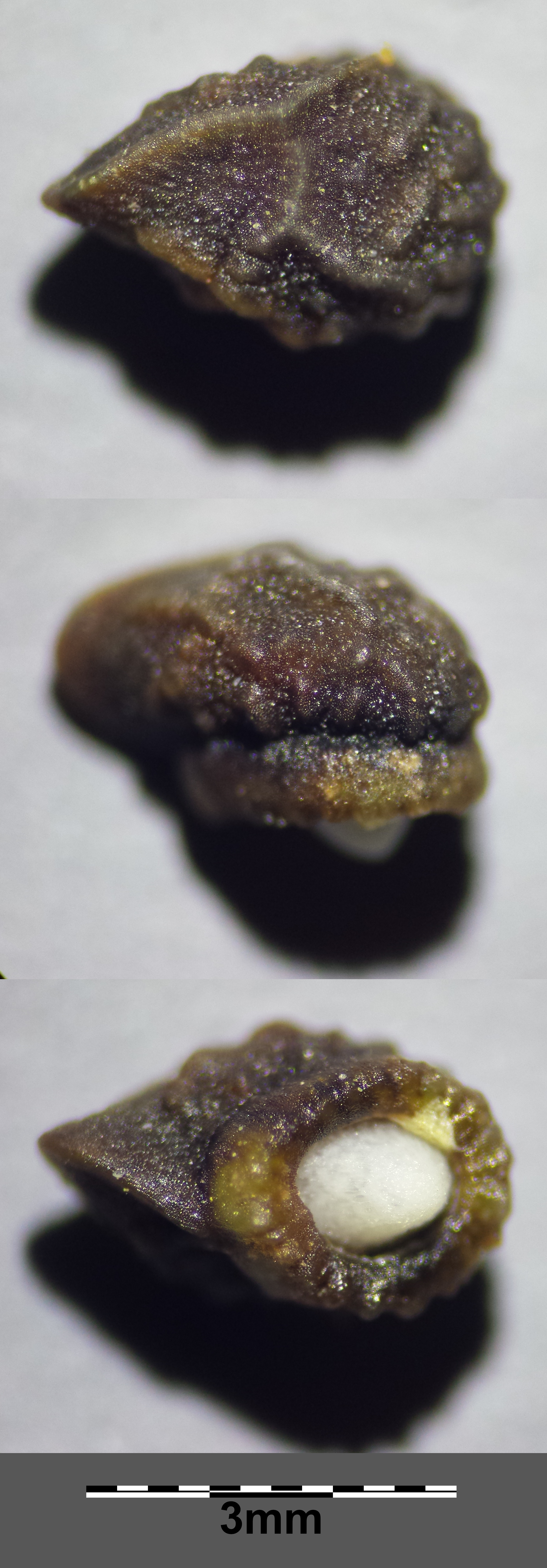
A. arvensis nutlets and seed.

== Distribution and habitat ==
The plant is native to continental Europe, and was introduced in North America, the UK, South America, Tasmania and Russia.

Anchusa arvensis is found in arable field margins, sandy heaths, disturbed ground.

Anchusa arvensis flowers April to September in the UK and from February to July in Portugal.

== Subspecies ==
It has two subspecies, both present in Portugal:

- Anchusa arvensis subsp. arvensis
- Anchusa arvensis subsp. orientalis

== Common Names ==
In Portugal it has several commons names such as buglossa, buglossa-do-norte, erva-do-fígado, erva-sangue, borrage, borragem, chupa-mel, língua-de-vaca or orcaneta.

== Conservation ==
Of the two subspecies, none is currently protected by Portuguese legislation or by the European Union. It is considered to be Near Threatened in Switzerland, and likely Least Concern overall. In the UK it is a declining species with patchy distribution, however conservation status as of 2005 is least concern.

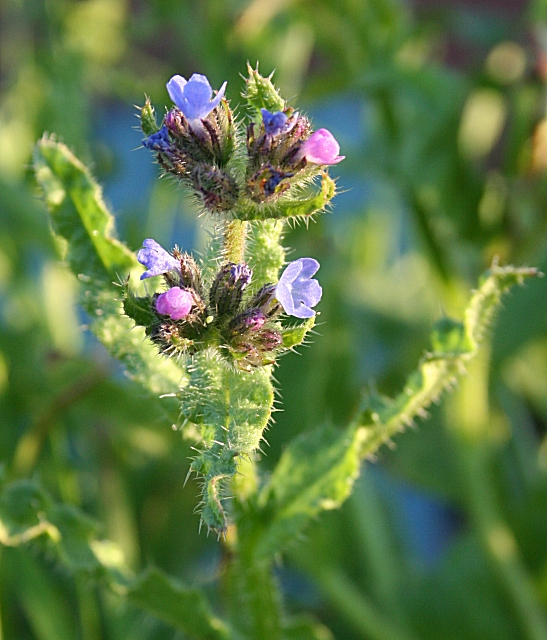
A. arvensis in the UK.

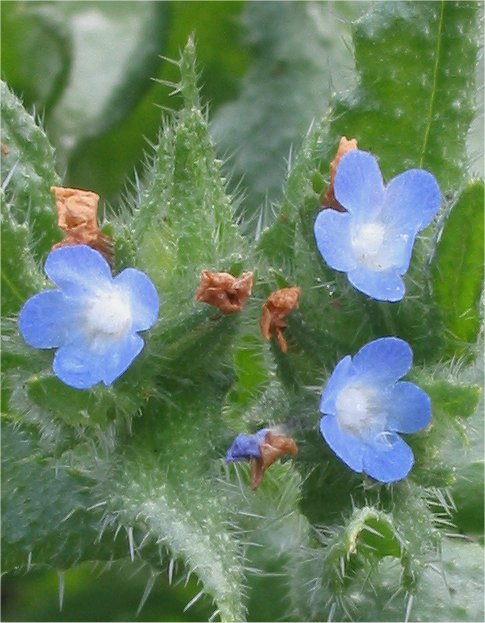
A. arvensis flowers.

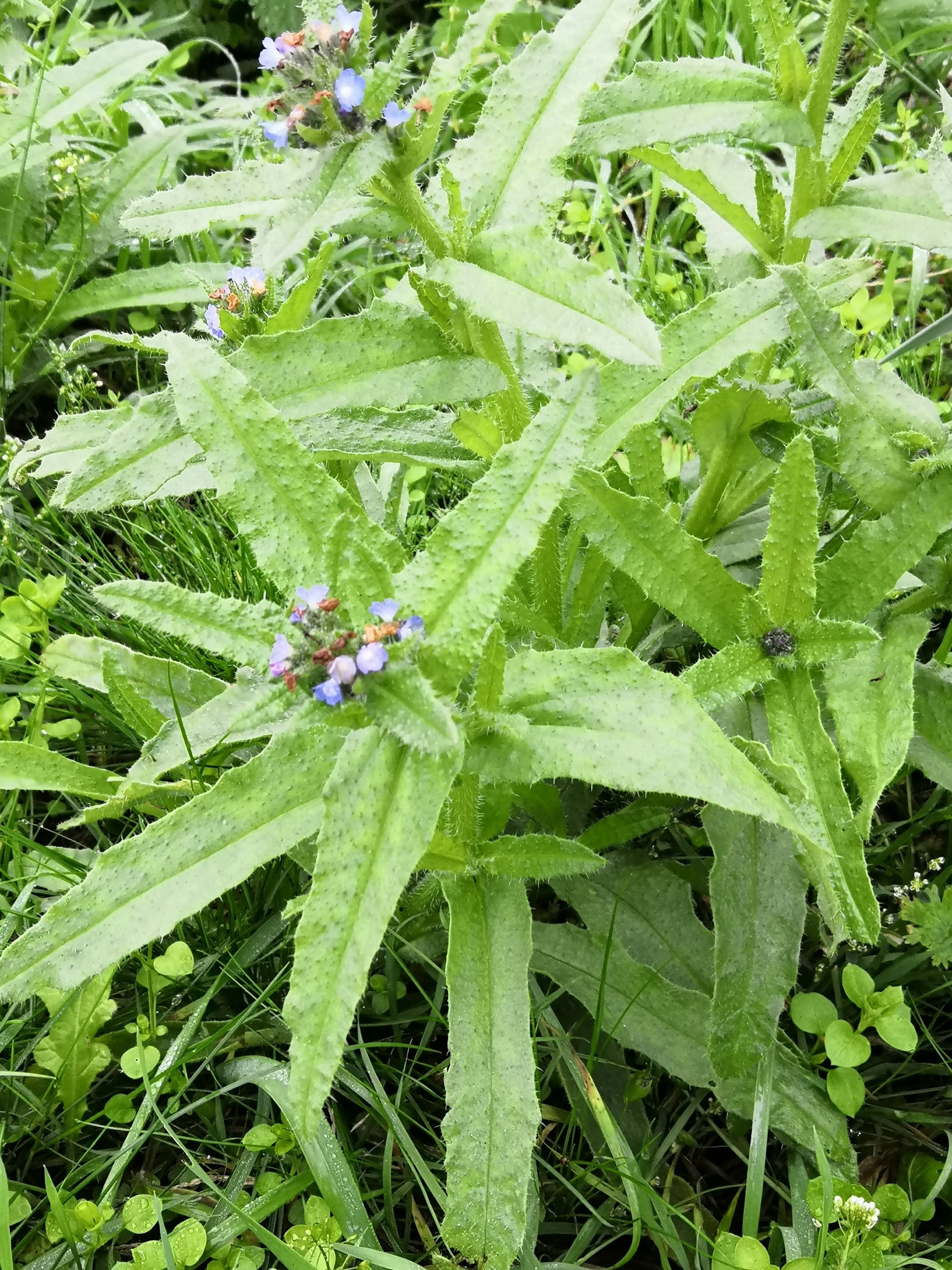
A. arvensis leaves.

== Synonyms ==
This species has 11 synonyms, 3 homotypic and 8 heterotypic:

=== Homotypic Synonyms ===
- Buglossa arvensis (L.) Gray in Nat. Arr. Brit. Pl. 2: 351 (1821 publ. 1822)
- Buglossites arvensis (L.) Bubani in Fl. Pyren. 1: 494 (1897)
- Lycopsis arvensis (L.) in Sp. Pl.: 139 (1753)

=== Heterotypic Synonyms ===
- Anchusa arvensis subsp. occidentalis (Kusn.) Nordh. in Norsk Fl. (Oslo): 526 (1940)
- Anchusa arvensis var stricta Boenn. in Prodr. Fl. Monast. Westphal.: 54 (1824)
- Anchusa lateriflora Dumort. in Fl. Belg.: 41 (1827)
- Echioides arvensis Poir. ex Steud. in Nomencl. Bot., ed. 2, 1: 538 (1840), not validly publ.
- Lycopsis arvensis subsp. occidentalis Kusn. in Trudy Bot. Muz. Imp. Akad. Nauk 8: 96 (1911)
- Lycopsis orientalis Stephan in Enum. Stirp. Agr. Mosq.: 122 (1792)
- Lycopsis undulata Gilib. in Fl. Lit. Inch. 1: 26 (1782), opus utique oppr.
- Nonea arvensis DC. ex Steud. in Nomencl. Bot. 1: 556 (1821), not validly publ.
