= Velika Kostrevnica =

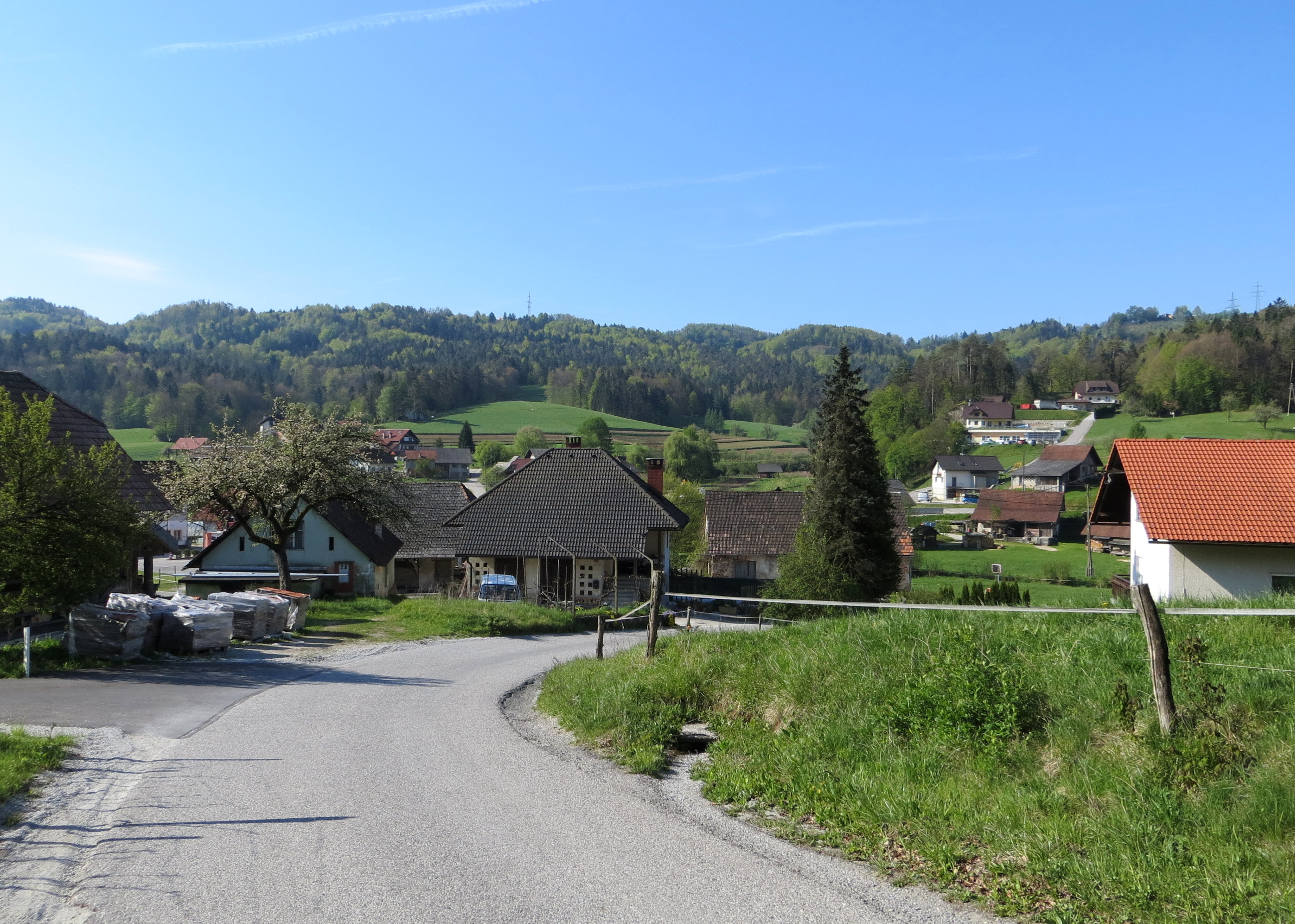

- Location in Slovenia
- Coordinates: 46°1′36.61″N 14°52′35.9″E
- Country: Slovenia
- Traditional region: Lower Carniola
- Statistical region: Central Slovenia
- Municipality: Šmartno pri Litiji

Area
  - Total: 0.81 km^{2} (0.31 sq mi)
- Elevation: 306.4 m (1,005 ft)

Population (2002)
  - Total: 195

Velika Kostrevnica (pronounced [ˈʋeːlika kɔˈstɾeːu̯nitsa]) is a settlement in the Municipality of Šmartno pri Litiji in central Slovenia. It lies in a small valley southeast of Šmartno. The area is part of the historical region of Lower Carniola and is included in the Central Slovenia Statistical Region.

== Name ==
The name Velika Kostrevnica literally means 'big Kostrevnica' and distinguishes the settlement from neighboring Mala Kostrevnica (literally, 'little Kostrevnica'). The name Kostrevnica is derived from the Slovene plant name kostreva (or kostreba), referring to cockspur grass or rye brome, thus reflecting the local vegetation.

== Cultural heritage ==
There is evidence of a still unexcavated Hallstatt period burial ground near the settlement.
