= C. arvense =

C. arvense may refer to:

- Cerastium arvense, the field chickweed, a flowering plant species
- Cirsium arvense, a plant species native throughout Europe and northern Asia and widely introduced elsewhere

== See also ==
- Arvense (disambiguation)
