= Mala Kostrevnica =

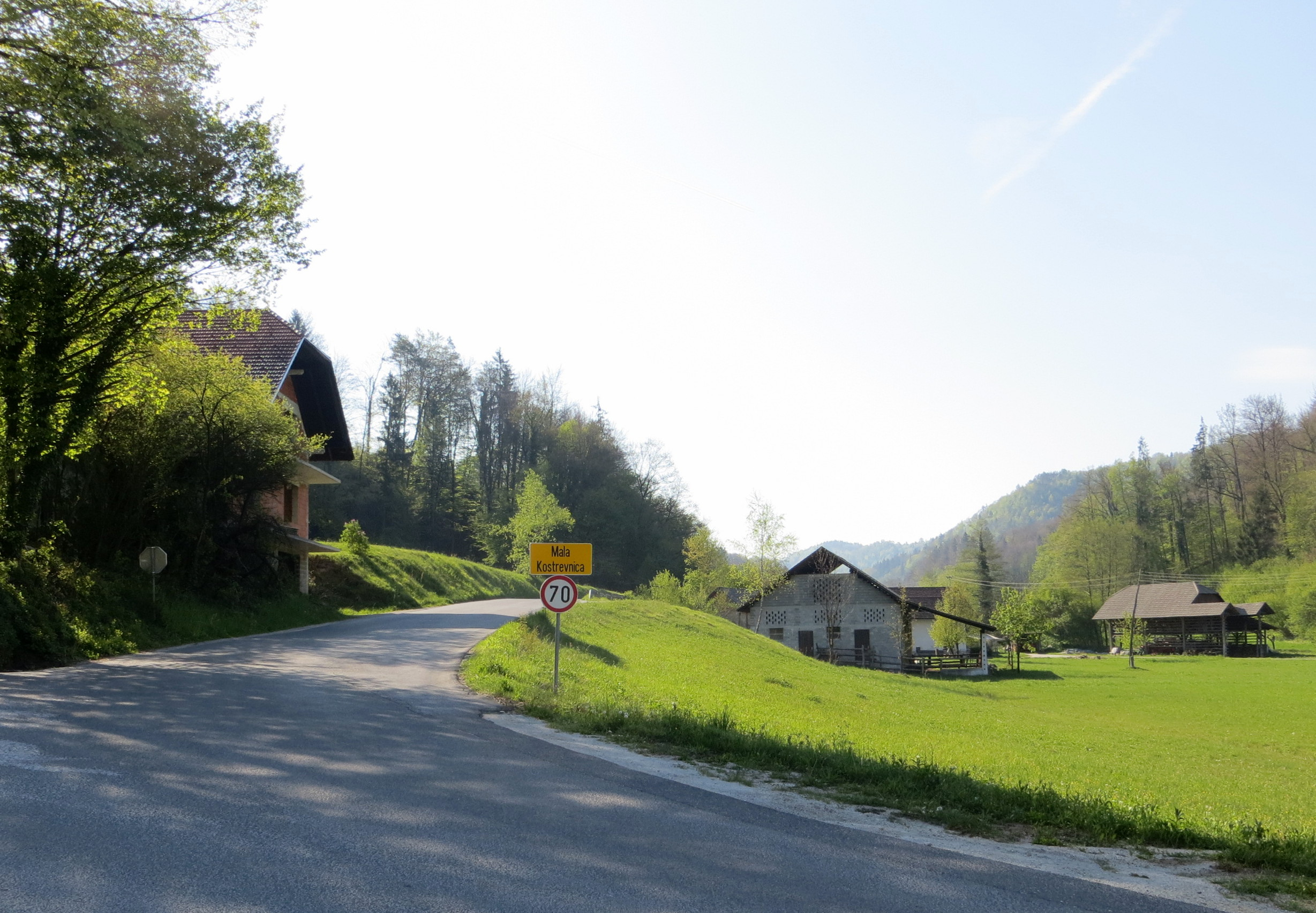

- Location in Slovenia
- Coordinates: 46°2′32.68″N 14°51′18.89″E
- Country: Slovenia
- Traditional region: Lower Carniola
- Statistical region: Central Slovenia
- Municipality: Šmartno pri Litiji

Area
  - Total: 1.82 km^{2} (0.70 sq mi)
- Elevation: 279.2 m (916 ft)

Population (2002)
  - Total: 211

Mala Kostrevnica (pronounced [ˈmaːla kɔˈstɾeːu̯nitsa]; German: Kleinkostreinitz) is a settlement immediately southeast of Šmartno pri Litiji in central Slovenia. The area is part of the historical region of Lower Carniola. The Municipality of Šmartno pri Litiji is included in the Central Slovenia Statistical Region.

== Name ==
The name Mala Kostrevnica literally means 'little Kostrevnica' and distinguishes the settlement from neighboring Velika Kostrevnica (literally, 'big Kostrevnica'). The name Kostrevnica is derived from the Slovene plant name kostreva (or kostreba), referring to cockspur grass or rye brome, thus reflecting the local vegetation. In the past the German name was Kleinkostreinitz.

== Cultural heritage ==
A number of prehistoric burial grounds have been identified and some investigated in the area of the settlement.
