= C. arvensis =

C. arvensis may refer to:

- Calendula arvensis, the field marigold, a flowering plant species
- Coleosporium sonchi-arvensis, a synonym for Coleosporium tussilaginis
- Convolvulus arvensis, the field bindweed, a bindweed species native to Europe and Asia

== See also ==
- Arvensis (disambiguation)
