= Arvensis =

Arvensis, a Latin adjective meaning in the fields, is the specific epithet of the following:

- Acinos arvensis, a synonym of Clinopodium acinos, the basil thyme
- Agaricus arvensis, the horse mushroom, a mushroom of the genus Agaricus
- Alauda arvensis, the skylark, a small passerine bird species
- Anagallis arvensis, the scarlet pimpernel or red pimpernel, red chickweed, poorman's barometer, shepherd's weather glass
- Anchusa arvensis, the small bugloss and annual bugloss, a plant species of the genus Anchusa
- Anthemis arvensis, the corn chamomile or mayweed, scentless chamomile and field chamomile, anthémis des champs
- Aphanes arvensis, the field parsley-piert, the western lady's-mantle, the parsley breakstone, a species of the genus Aphanes
- Bromus arvensis, the field brome, a grass species native to Europe and Asia
- Buglossoides arvensis, a synonym for Lithospermum arvense
- Calendula arvensis, the field marigold, a flowering plant species
- Coleosporium sonchi-arvensis, a synonym for Coleosporium tussilaginis
- Convolvulus arvensis, the field bindweed, a bindweed species native to Europe and Asia
- Knautia arvensis, a species in the genus Knautia
- Mentha arvensis, the field mint, the wild mint or the corn mint, a plant species with a circumboreal distribution
- Myosotis arvensis, the field forget-me-not, a herbaceous annual plant species
- Nigella arvensis, an annual plant species of the genus Nigella
- Ononis arvensis, a herb species of the genus Ononis
- Ranunculus arvensis, a plant species of the genus Ranunculus
- Sherardia arvensis, the field madder, a flowering plant species
- Sinapis arvensis, the wild mustard or charlock, a plant species
- Sonchus arvensis, the corn sow thistle, dindle, field sow thistle, gutweed, swine thistle, tree sow thistle or field sowthistle, a plant species
- Spergula arvensis, the corn spurry
- Torilis arvensis, a species of flowering plant in the parsley family known by the common names common hedge parsley and spreading hedge parsley
- Veronica arvensis, the corn speedwell, common speedwell, speedwell, rock Speedwell, wall Speedwell, a medicinal plant species and a noxious weed
- Viola arvensis, the field pansy, a flowering plant species

== See also ==
- Arvense, a Latin word with the same meaning (the neuter form of "arvensis")
