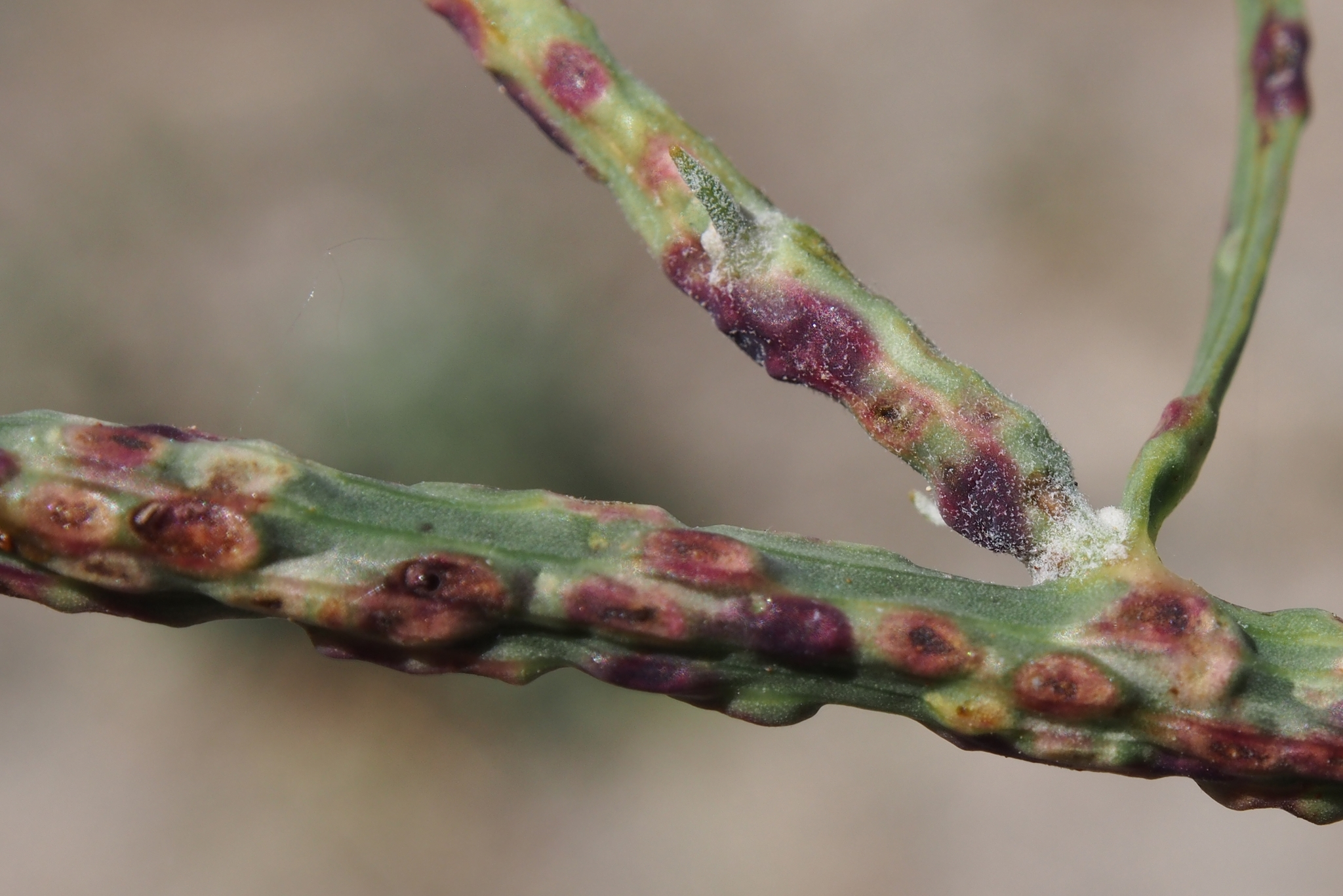

Scientific classification
- Domain: Eukaryota
- Kingdom: Animalia
- Phylum: Arthropoda
- Class: Insecta
- Order: Diptera
- Family: Cecidomyiidae
- Genus: Cystiphora
- Species: C. schmidti

Binomial name
- Cystiphora schmidti (Rübsaamen, 1914)

Synonyms
- Laubertia schmidti Rubsaamen, 1914

= Cystiphora schmidti =

Species of fly

Cystiphora schmidti, commonly known as the rush skeletonweed gall midge, is a species of gall midge in the family Cecidomyiidae.
