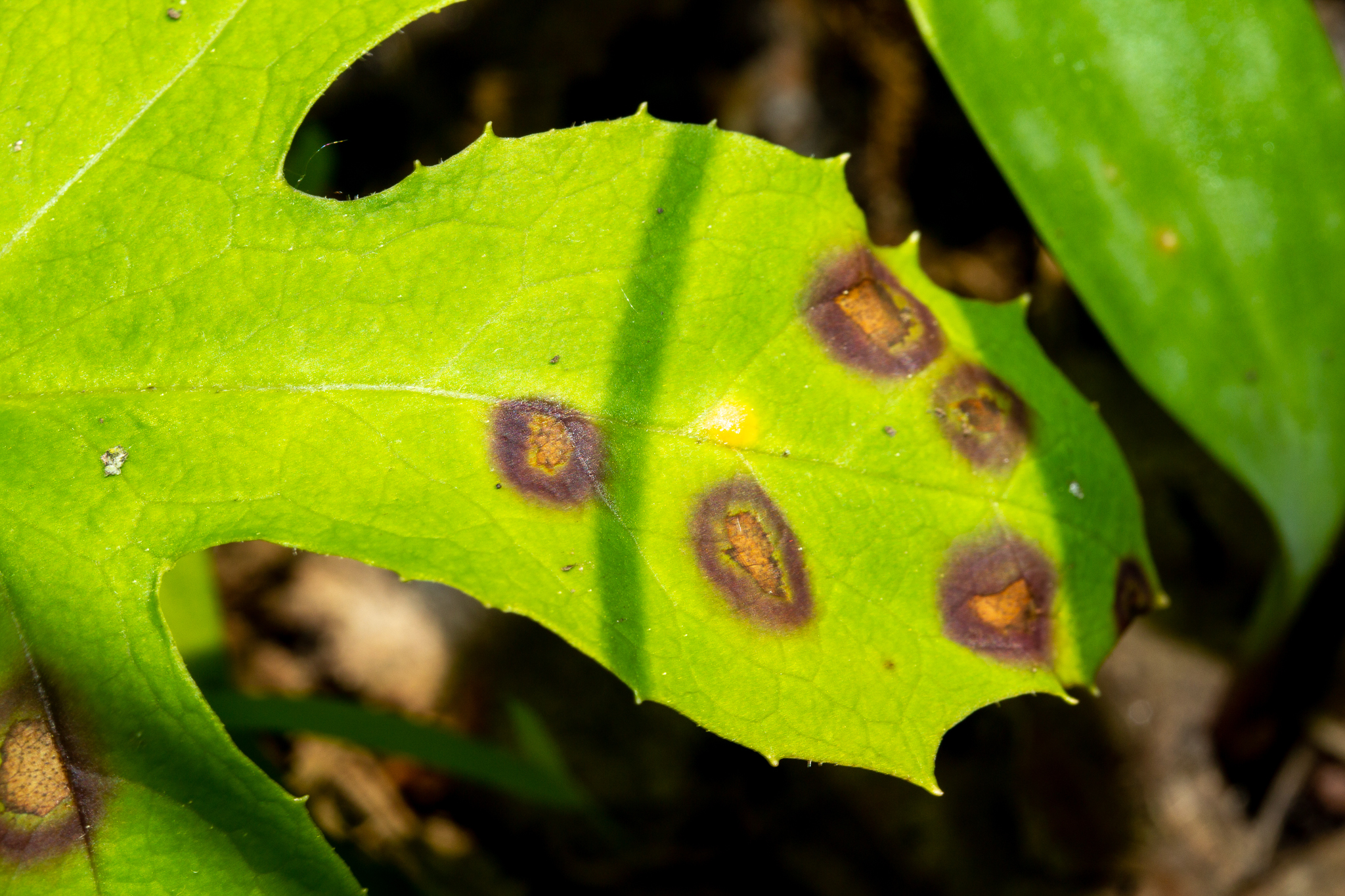
- Leaf galls caused by Cystiphora canadensis

Scientific classification
- Domain: Eukaryota
- Kingdom: Animalia
- Phylum: Arthropoda
- Class: Insecta
- Order: Diptera
- Family: Cecidomyiidae
- Supertribe: Lasiopteridi
- Genus: Cystiphora; Kieffer, 1892

= Cystiphora =

Genus of flies

Cystiphora is a genus of gall midges in the family Cecidomyiidae. There are about seven described species in the genus Cystiphora.

== Species ==
These seven species belong to the genus Cystiphora:

- Cystiphora canadensis Felt, 1913^{i c g}
- Cystiphora leontodontis (Bremi, 1847)^{c g}
- Cystiphora sanguinea (Bremi, 1847)^{c g}
- Cystiphora schmidti (Rübsaamen, 1914)^{i c g b} (rush skeletonweed gall midge)
- Cystiphora scorzonerae Kieffer, 1909^{c g}
- Cystiphora sonchi (Bremi, 1847)^{i c g b}
- Cystiphora taraxaci (Kieffer, 1888)^{c g}

Data sources: i = ITIS, c = Catalogue of Life, g = GBIF, b = Bugguide.net
