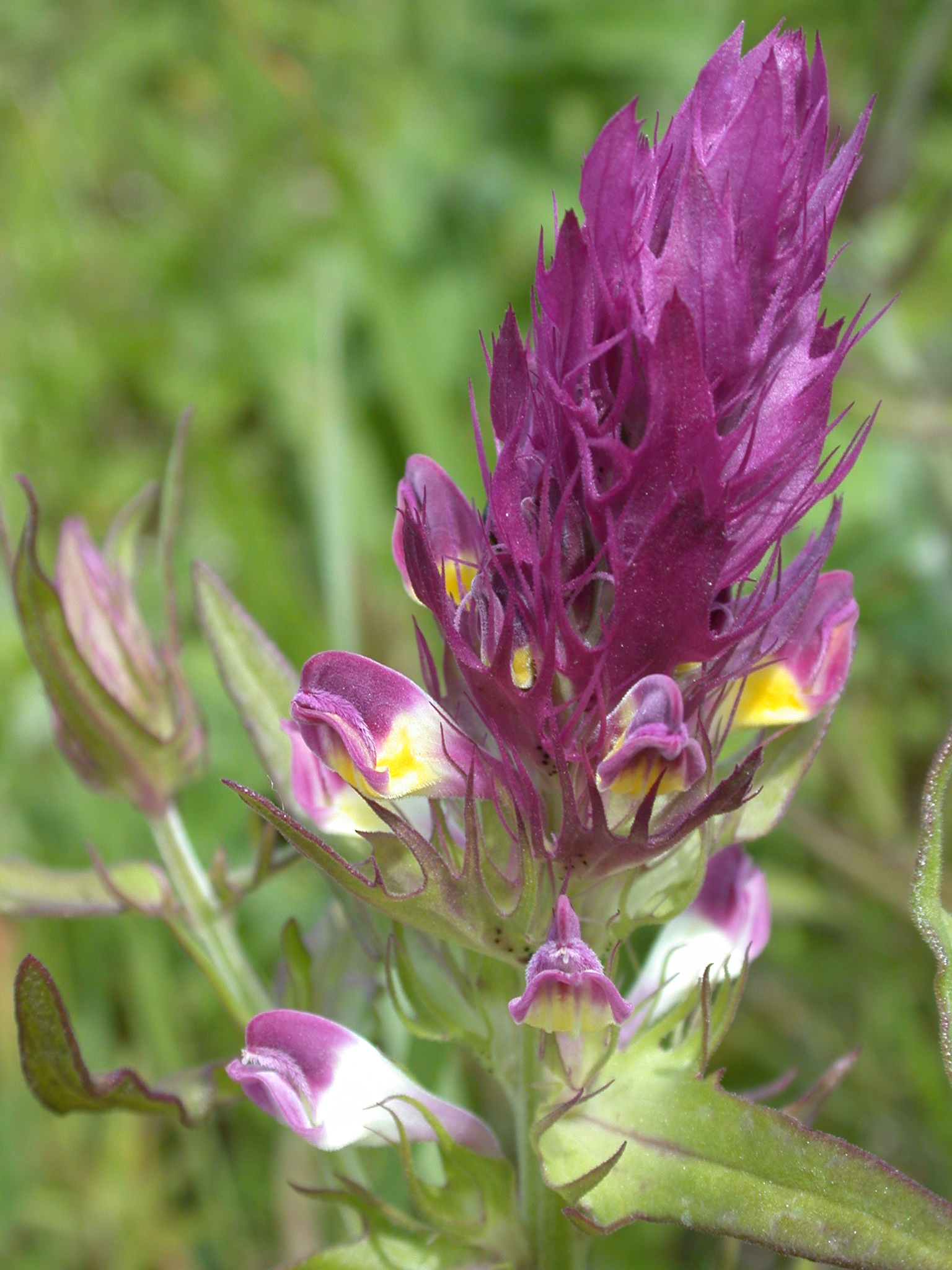

Scientific classification
- Kingdom: Plantae
- Clade: Tracheophytes
- Clade: Angiosperms
- Clade: Eudicots
- Clade: Asterids
- Order: Lamiales
- Family: Orobanchaceae
- Genus: Melampyrum
- Species: M. arvense

Binomial name
- Melampyrum arvense L.

= Melampyrum arvense =

Species of flowering plant

Melampyrum arvense, commonly known as field cow-wheat, is an herbaceous flowering plant of the genus Melampyrum in the family Orobanchaceae. It is striking because of the conspicuous spike of pink or purple terminal bracts which includes the flowers.

The Latin specific epithet arvense means "growing in cultivated fields".

== Description ==
The upright stems of this species, which may branch, are terminated by a spike of pink to purple bracts amongst which the tubular flowers appear. Younger, lower bracts are green however, as the pink/purple colour appears and deepens only with time. The plant grows up to 40 or 60 cm high.

The ordinary leaves are lanceolate and opposite and may have short teeth. The bracts are also lanceolate and have long teeth up to 8 mm. The flowers are two-lipped with a closed throat and are 2 – 2.5 cm long. They are pink to purple with a yellow or white patch.

== Distribution, season, ecology ==
This European plant flowers from June to September. It is favoured by a dry habitat and chalky soil.

It is distributed throughout Western Europe except in central & southern Spain, southern Italy, Ireland, Iceland, Norway, central and northern Sweden, and northern Finland. Also its range extends east to the Ural Mountains and it is found in Turkey. In Great Britain it only occurs in a few locations in south-east England. It is becoming rarer, at least in Britain, France, Belgium, Germany, the Netherlands and Finland; this may be due to a reduced area of arable land and changes in farming practices, such as seed-cleaning and intensification.

This species is hemiparasitic, commonly on the roots of grasses but also on those of other plants. It cannot flourish without a host from which to take nutrients. In an experiment where the growth of M. arvense was compared on rye grass, alfalfa and flax, it was found to grow much the best on the leguminous plant, alfalfa.

The flowers are pollinated by bumblebees. The seeds may be dispersed by ants which are attracted by a small oil body (elaiosome) attached to each seed and which carry them to their nests for food. Like some other species of Melampyrum, on their undersides the bracts have minute nectar-producing glands which attract ants, bumblebees and other insects. These glands are violet in the case of M. arvense, are visible under a hand lens, and take the form of minute scales (about 0.45mm in diameter) which secrete a sugary solution.

== Human impact ==
Field cow-wheat is an annual weed of arable fields as well as a component of some natural grassy meadow ecosystems. The seeds are poisonous because they hold aucubin. The plant is being targeted by some groups for conservation projects and policy. As with Yellow Rattle (Rhinanthus species), it is sometimes considered to be a valuable part of restoration projects by reducing the vigor, and cover, of grasses and legumes. This enables more forbs (wildflowers) to colonize the land, increasing diversity as well as the land's nectar and pollen production. It is also considered to have aesthetic value.
