= Arvense =

Arvense (the neuter form of arvensis), a Latin adjective meaning in the fields, is the specific epithet of the following:

- Anemopaegma arvense, a medicinal plant native to Cerrado vegetation in Brazil
- Arvense (section), a section within the mushroom genus Agaricus
- Cerastium arvense, the field chickweed, a flowering plant species
- Cirsium arvense, a plant species native throughout Europe and northern Asia and widely introduced elsewhere
- Equisetum arvense, a herbaceous perennial plant, native throughout the arctic and temperate regions of the northern hemisphere
- Lithospermum arvense, a flowering plant of the family Boraginaceae
- Melampyrum arvense, an herbaceous flowering plant of the genus Melampyrum in the family Orobanchaceae
- Thlaspi arvense, the field penny-cress, a foetid Eurasian plant species naturalized throughout North America
- Trifolium arvense, the haresfoot clover, a clover species

== See also ==
- Arvensis, a Latin word with the same meaning
