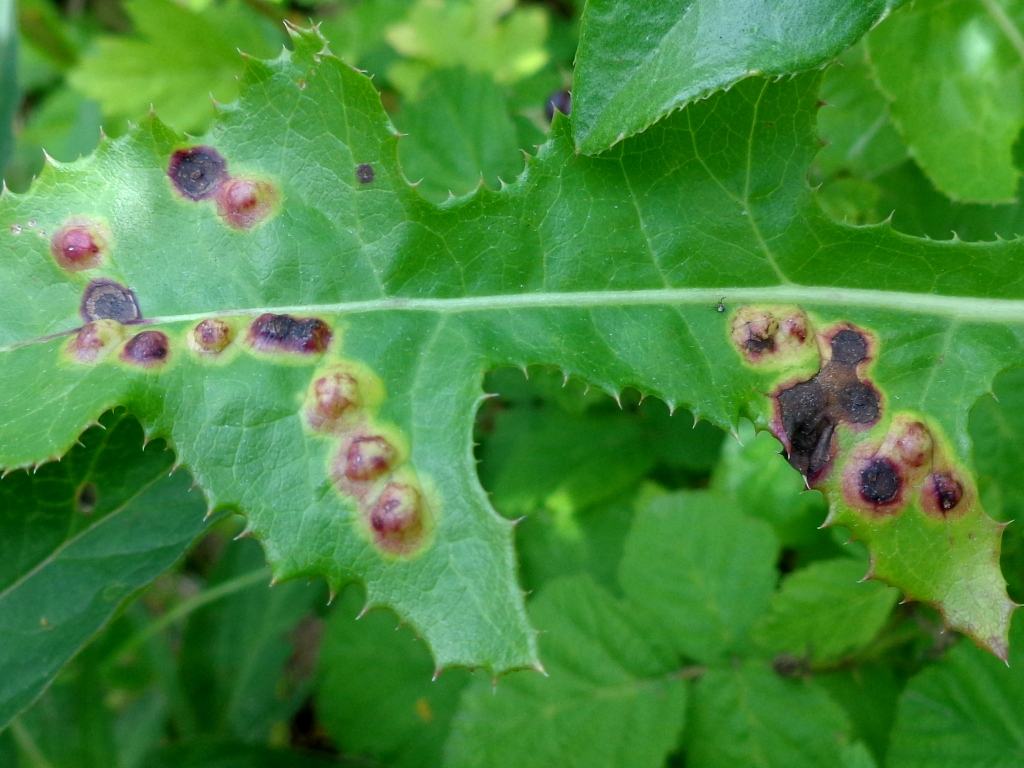
- Cystiphora sonchi on Sonchus arvensis. Found in Bērzi village near Bauska city, Latvia

Scientific classification
- Kingdom: Animalia
- Phylum: Arthropoda
- Class: Insecta
- Order: Diptera
- Family: Cecidomyiidae
- Genus: Cystiphora
- Species: C. sonchi

Binomial name
- Cystiphora sonchi (Bremi, 1847)

Synonyms
- Cecidomyia sonchi Bremi, 1847

= Cystiphora sonchi =

Species of fly

Cystiphora sonchi is a species of gall midge in the family Cecidomyiidae. It is native to Eurasia, but has been introduced to North America as a biocontrol of sow thistles. The larvae cause small, circular galls on the leaves of the host plants. Several species of parasitic wasps use the larvae as hosts.

This species was first described as Cecidomyia sonchi by Swiss entomologist Johann Jacob Bremi-Wolf in 1847.
