= Nikolai Kuznetsov (botanist) =

Estonian botanist

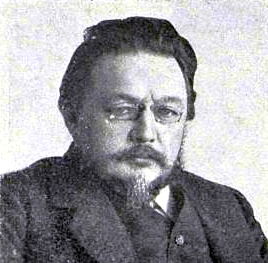
Nikolai I. Kuznetsov

Nikolai Ivanovich Kuznetsov (Николай Иванович Кузнецов; 1864-1932) was a Russian botanist. He was born and died in Saint Petersburg (Leningrad). He was a graduate of and a professor at Saint Petersburg State University.

Kuznetsov spent 30 years of his career exploring the flora of the Caucasus. He was considered, along with Alexander Fomin and Nikolai Busch, a leading authority on the subject since the late 1880s, when all three conducted expeditions in the Caucasus under the auspices of the Russian Geographical Society. He penned a lot of articles for the Brockhaus and Efron Encyclopedic Dictionary.

Between 1895 and 1911, Kuznetsov was based in Tartu (then called Yuriev), first as director of the local botanical garden, then (from 1901) as a professor at the Imperial University of Dorpat. He was the president of Estonian Naturalists' Society in 1905–1911. Flora caucasica critica, his magnum opus, was published during this period. He was elected a corresponding member of the Saint Petersburg Academy of Sciences in 1904.

Between 1915 and 1918, Kuznetsov was based in Crimea, working as director of the Nikitsky Botanical Garden and teaching at the Tauride University.

Kuznetsov has described over 30 plant taxa, including:

- Cynanchum albowianum Kusn., Fl. Caucas. Crit. iv. I. 445 (1905)
- Cynanchum boissieri Kusn., Fl. Caucas. Crit. iv. I. 455 (1905)
- Cynanchum funebre Kusn., Fl. Caucas. Crit. iv. I. 461 (1905)
