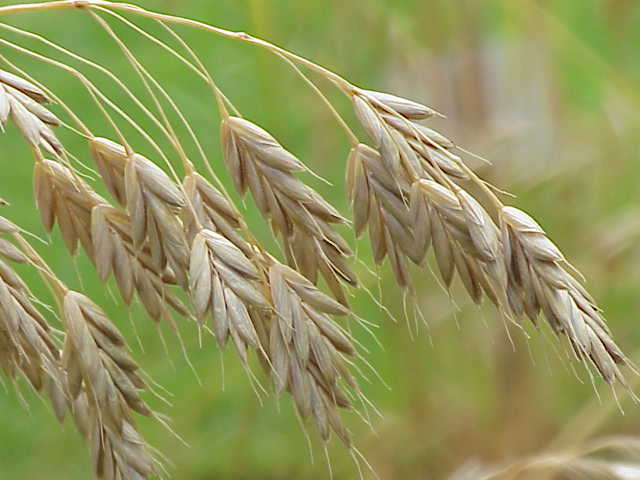

Scientific classification
- Kingdom: Plantae
- Clade: Tracheophytes
- Clade: Angiosperms
- Clade: Monocots
- Clade: Commelinids
- Order: Poales
- Family: Poaceae
- Subfamily: Pooideae
- Genus: Bromus
- Species: B. secalinus

Binomial name
- Bromus secalinus L.

= Bromus secalinus =

Species of grass

Bromus secalinus is a species of bromegrass known as rye brome. The specific epithet secalinus is Latin, meaning "rye-like". The fruits are hard, rounded glumes that appear superficially similar to the rye grain, which gives the brome its common and scientific name. The grass has a diploid number of 28.

The grass is native to Eurasia but is well known in many other parts of the world where it has been introduced. It is a noxious weed throughout much of North America.

== Description ==
Bromus secalinus is an annual grass that grows 0.1–1.3 m (4 in – 4 ft 3 in) high. The upper sheaths are smooth and strongly nerved, and the lower sheaths are glabrous or slightly pubescent. The leaf blades are 15–30 cm (6–12 in) long and 2–4 mm (0.1–0.2 in) wide, and are covered with short hairs. The panicles are 3–20 cm (1–8 in) long and 2.5–12 cm (1–5 in) wide with spreading or ascending branches. The spreading inflorescence nods when it becomes heavy with grain though prior to maturity the panicle is erect. The spikelets are on elongated pedicels, with each spikelet bearing five to fifteen flowers. The spikelets are glabrous or scabrous and become lax when mature. The ovoid spikelets measure 10–20 mm (0.4–0.8 in) long. The rachilla is obvious in youth and becomes obscured by the expanding florets with age. The lower glumes are three to five-veined and 4–6 mm (0.2–0.2 in) long, and the upper glumes are seven-veined and 6–7 mm (0.2–0.3 in) long. The lemmas become spreading when mature and are strongly inrolled. The lemmas have seven inconspicuous nerves and are 5–8 mm (0.2–0.3 in) long and 1.7–2.5 mm (0.1–0.1 in) wide. The awns are straight or curved and are 1–6 mm (0.0–0.2 in) long. The palea is as long or longer than the lemma and its tip slightly projects at maturity. The anthers are 1.5–1.8 mm (0.1–0.1 in) long. The caryopses are thick and strongly inrolled when mature.

The grass flowers from June to September.

In youth the two brome grasses Bromus secalinus and Bromus arvensis are very similar, but are easily distinguishable in maturity. Bromus arvensis has fully pubescent leaves but Bromus secalinus lacks trichomes on the undersides of leaves.

== Habitat and distribution ==
Bromus secalinus occurs in fields areas, road verges, and occasionally cornfields, in lightly stony soils.

The grass is native to Europe but is widespread throughout the United States and in Quebec and British Columbia.

== Uses ==
Although not considered very palatable, the grains are edible and starchy, and are suggested to have been used as food in Europe from the late Neolithic to the Iron Age.

In Lithuania, some farmhouse brewers malted brome and used it in their farmhouse ales.
