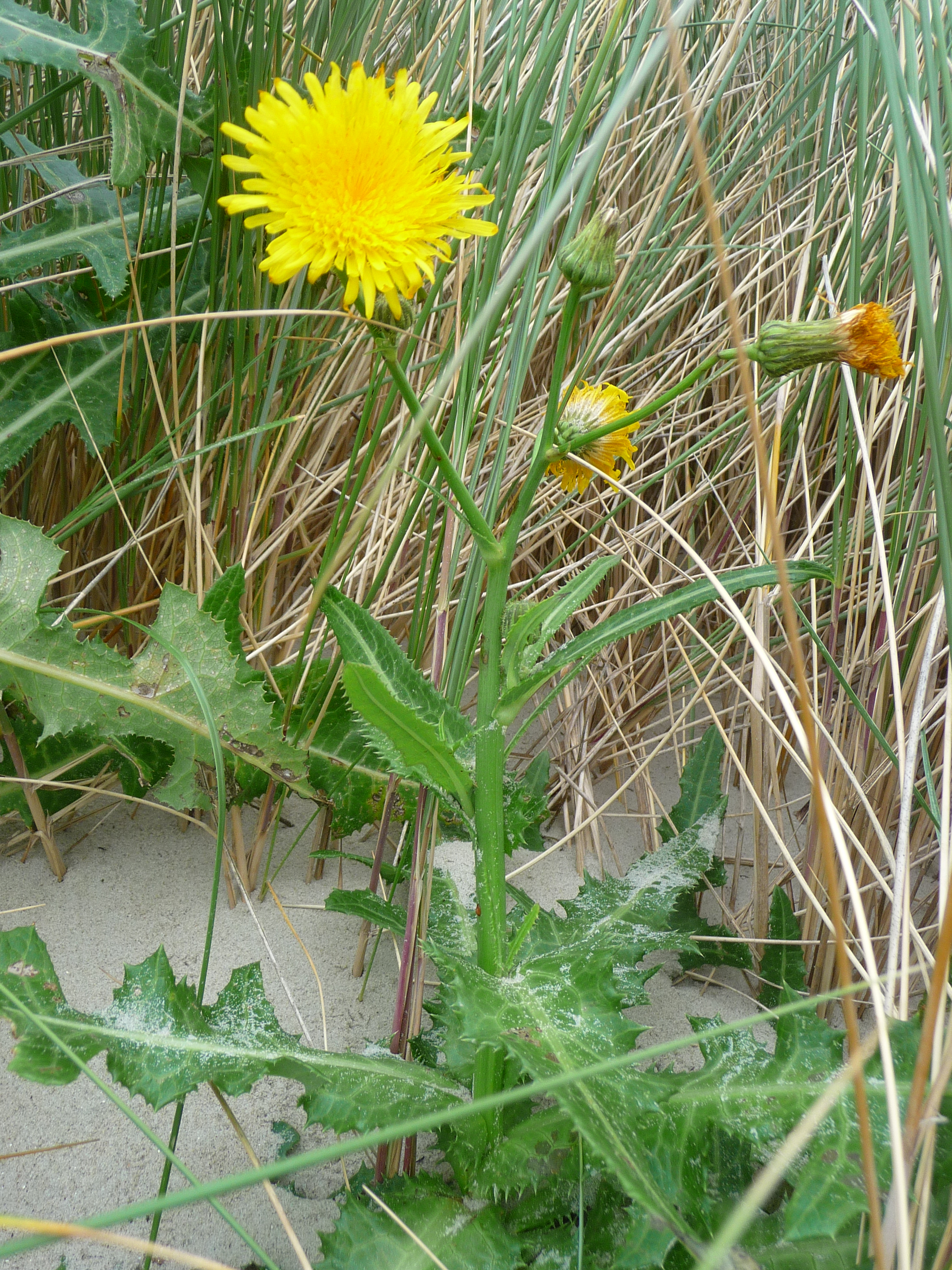

Scientific classification
- Kingdom: Plantae
- Clade: Tracheophytes
- Clade: Angiosperms
- Clade: Eudicots
- Clade: Asterids
- Order: Asterales
- Family: Asteraceae
- Genus: Sonchus
- Species: S. arvensis

Binomial name
- Sonchus arvensis L. 1753

Synonyms
- Synonymy: Hieracium arvense (L.) Scop.; Sonchoseris arvensis Fourr.; Sonchoseris decora Fourr.; Sonchus exaltatus Wallr.; Sonchus glandulosus Schur; Sonchus hantoniensis Sweet; Sonchus hispidus Gilib.; Sonchus laevissimus Schur; Sonchus nitidus Vill.; Sonchus pratensis Schur; Sonchus repens Bubani; Sonchus vulgaris Rouy; Sonchus humilis N.I.Orlova; Sonchus ketzkhovelii Schchian; Sonchus uliginosus M.Bieb.

= Sonchus arvensis =

Species of flowering plant in the daisy family

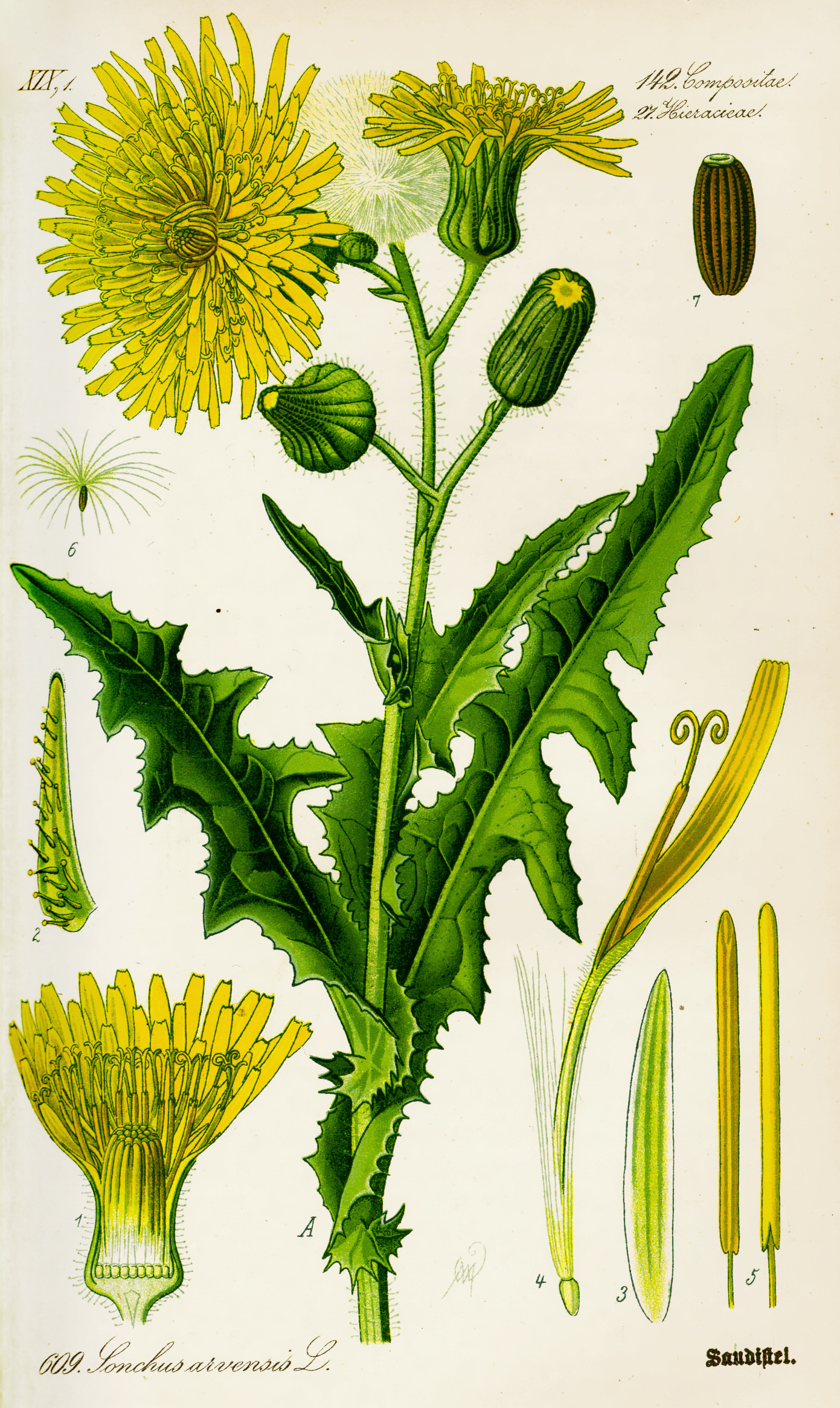
Illustration

Sonchus arvensis, the field milk thistle, field sowthistle, perennial sow-thistle, corn sow thistle, dindle, gutweed, swine thistle, or tree sow thistle, is a species of flowering plant in the family Asteraceae. S. arvensis often occurs in annual crop fields and may cause substantial yield losses.

== Description ==
The plant grows up to 1.5 metres (4 ft 11 in) in height, with leaves 10–35 cm (4–13 3/4 in) long and 4–14 cm (1 1/2–5 1/2 in) wide. It produces conspicuous yellow flowerheads about 3–5 cm (1 1/4–2 in) wide, which are visited by various types of insects—especially hoverflies of the genus Eristalis.

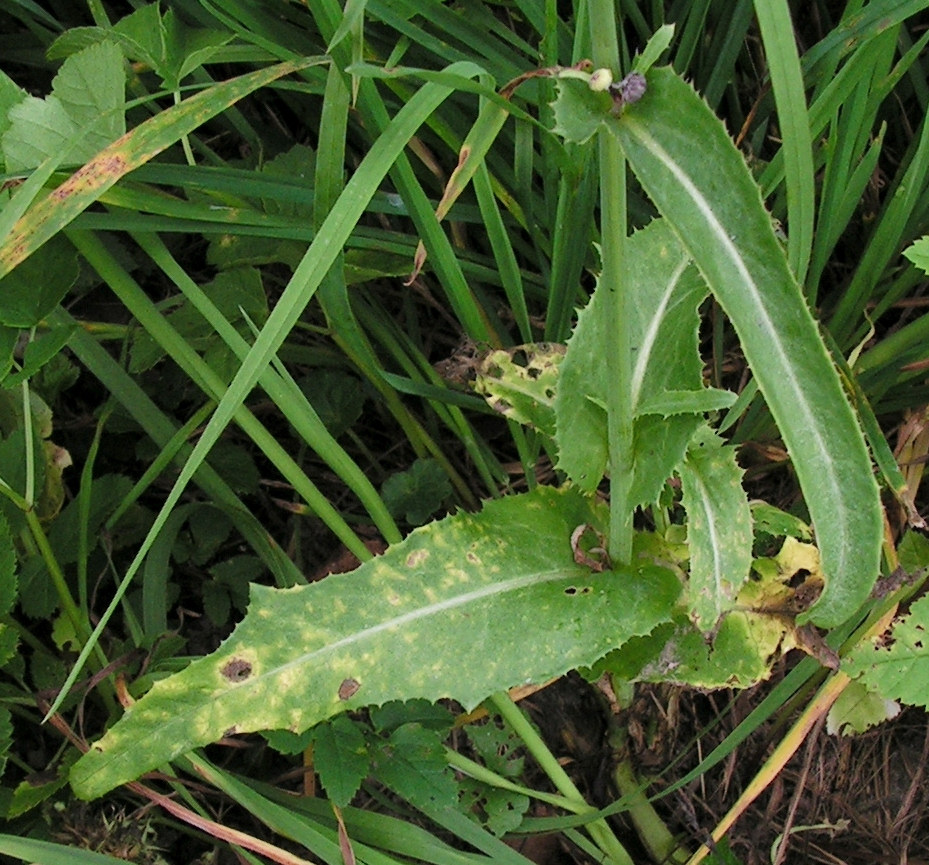
Leaves

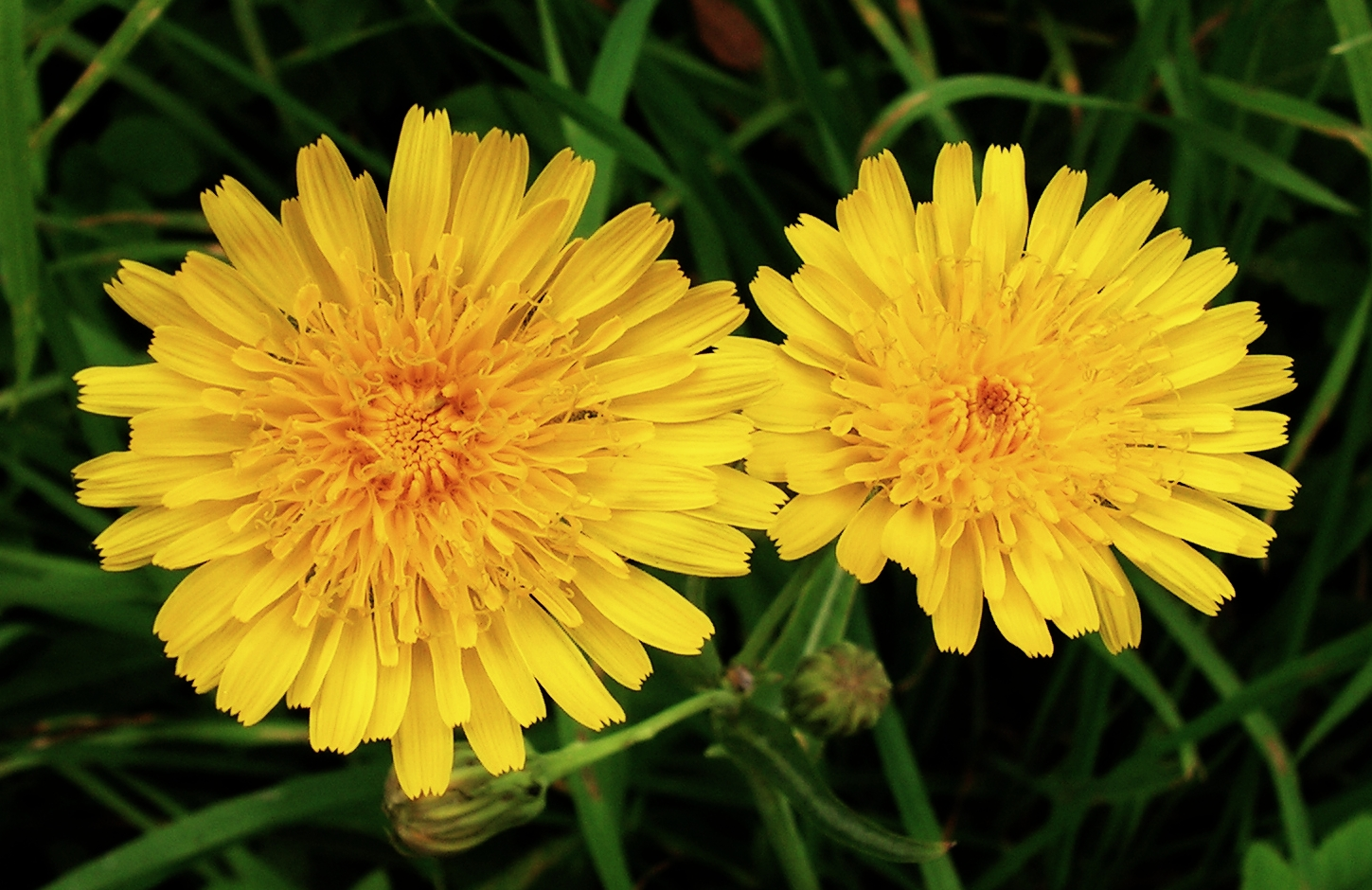
Flowerheads

Pappus

Gall caused by Cystiphora sonchi

== Distribution ==
Sonchus arvensis is native to Eurasia, where it is widespread across most of the continent. It has also become naturalized in many other regions, and is considered an invasive noxious weed in some places, such as North America (including Prince Edward Island), Russia, New Zealand, and Australia.

It grows in areas such as pastures, roadsides, bushlands and the shorelines of lakes, rivers and sea coast.

A study conducted in 2003 has shown that with future global atmospheric carbon levels, S. arvensis shows increased growth with increased atmospheric carbon which could potentially expand its range and outcompete native species.

== Uses ==
The young leaves, when less than a few inches long and not bitter in taste, can be mixed with other greens to make salad. They can also be boiled in a small quantity of water, changed once. The plant can contain toxic nitrates.
