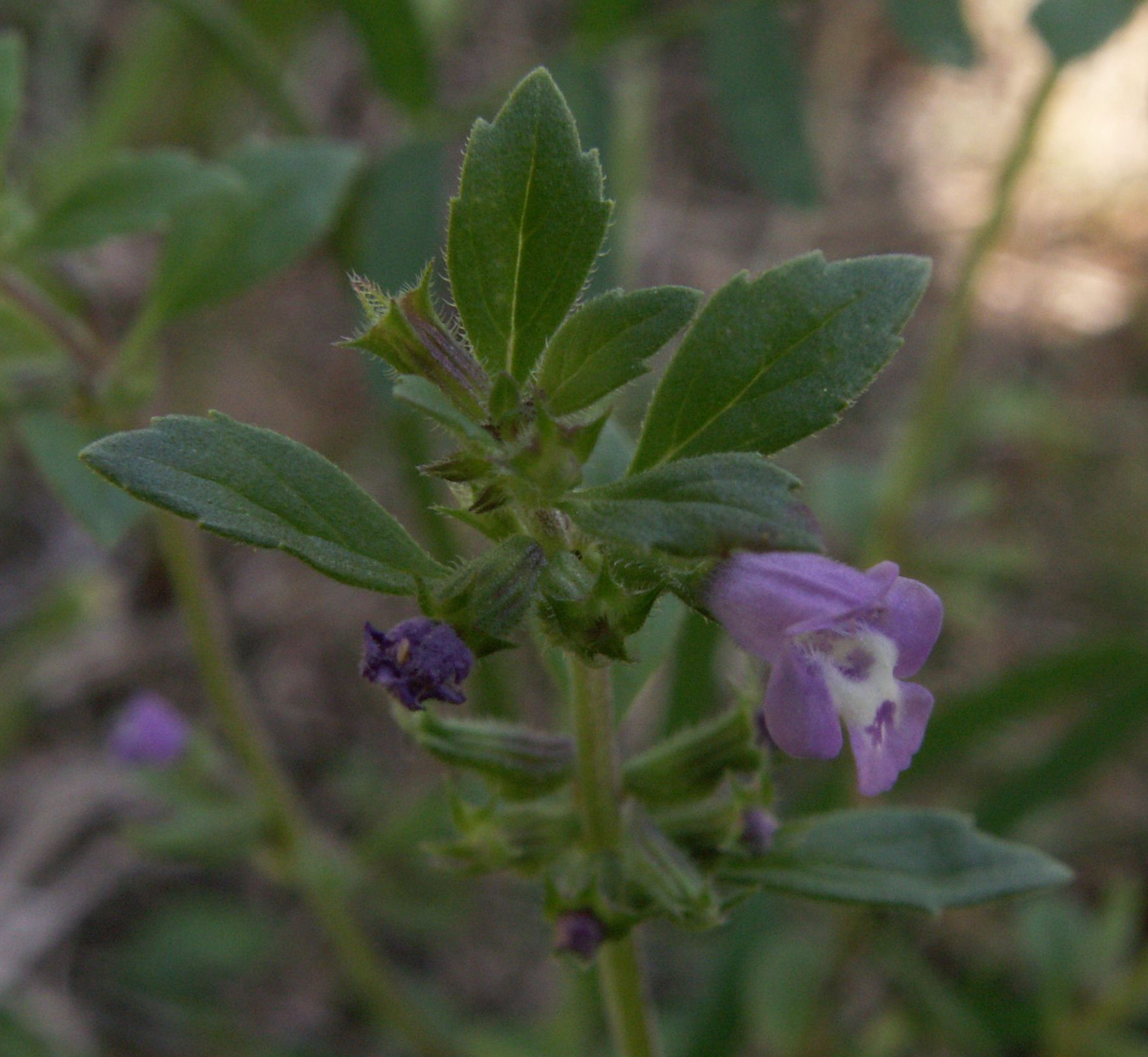

Conservation status
- Secure (NatureServe)

Scientific classification
- Kingdom: Plantae
- Clade: Tracheophytes
- Clade: Angiosperms
- Clade: Eudicots
- Clade: Asterids
- Order: Lamiales
- Family: Lamiaceae
- Genus: Clinopodium
- Species: C. acinos

Binomial name
- Clinopodium acinos (L.) Kuntze

Synonyms
- List: Acinos acinos (L.) Huth, not validly publ.; Acinos acuminatus Friv.; Acinos arvensis (Lam.) Dandy; Acinos arvensis subsp. eglandulosus (Klokov) Tzvelev; Acinos arvensis var. acuminatus (Friv.) Šilic; Acinos arvensis var. argutus (Rchb.) Šilic; Acinos arvensis var. lancifolius (Murb.) Šilic; Acinos arvensis var. perennans (Vis.) Šilic; Acinos arvensis subsp. villosus (Pers.) Soják; Acinos arvensis var. villosus (Pers.) Šilic; Acinos clinopodiifacie Gilib., opus utique oppr.; Acinos eglandulosus Klokov; Acinos infectus Klokov; Acinos schizodontus Klokov; Acinos subcrispus Klokov; Acinos thymoides Moench; Acinos thymoides var. perennans Vis.; Acinos thymoides var. villosus (Pers.) Vis.; Acinos villosus Pers.; Acinos villosus var. argutus Rchb.; Acinos vulgaris var. villosus (Pers.) Boenn.; Calamintha acinos (L.) Clairv.; Calamintha acinos var. lancifolia Murb.; Calamintha acinos var. villosa (Pers.) Gaudin; Calamintha arvensis Lam.; Calamintha heterophylla (Poir.) Heynh.; Calamintha villosa (Pers.) A.Terracc.; Clinopodium acinos subsp. villosum (Pers.) Peruzzi & F.Conti; Faucibarba acinos (L.) Dulac; Melissa acinos (L.) Benth.; Melissa arvensis (Lam.) Bubani; Satureja acinos (L.) Scheele; Satureja acinos var. canescens (Dumort.) T.Durand; Satureja acinos var. ellpitica Briq.; Satureja acinos var. lancifolia (Murb.) Briq.; Satureja villosa (Pers.) Dörfl.; Thymus acinoides Schleich. ex Rchb., nom. illeg.; Thymus acinos L.; Thymus acinos var. alpinus Mérat; Thymus acinos var. incanotomentosus Lej. & Courtois; Thymus acinos var. subglabra Lej.; Thymus acinos var. villosus (Pers.) Lej.; Thymus acinos var. vulgaris Lej. & Courtois; Thymus arvensis (Lam.) Schur; Thymus canescens Dumort.; Thymus concinnus Salisb., nom. superfl.; Thymus diffusus Bluff & Fingerh.; Thymus gibbosus Stokes; Thymus heterophyllus Poir.; Ziziphora acinos (L.) Melnikov; Ziziphora acuminata (Friv.) Melnikov; Ziziphora eglandulosa (Klokov) Melnikov; Ziziphora infecta (Klokov) Melnikov; Ziziphora schizodonta (Klokov) Melnikov; Ziziphora subcrispa (Klokov) Melnikov; Ziziphora villosa (Pers.) Melnikov

= Clinopodium acinos =

Species of flowering plant

Clinopodium acinos, many synonyms including Acinos arvensis, known commonly as basil thyme and spring savory, is a species of flowering plant in the family Lamiaceae.

It is a perennial that usually grows about 8 inches (20 cm) high and spreads 12 inches (30 cm). It prefers to grow in strong sunlight. The scent is faintly reminiscent of thyme, giving it one of its common names.

Clinopodium acinos is recorded as a food plant for the larva of the moth Coleophora tricolor.
