= Jean-Emmanuel Gilibert =

French politician, botanist, freemason & medical doctor (1741-1814)

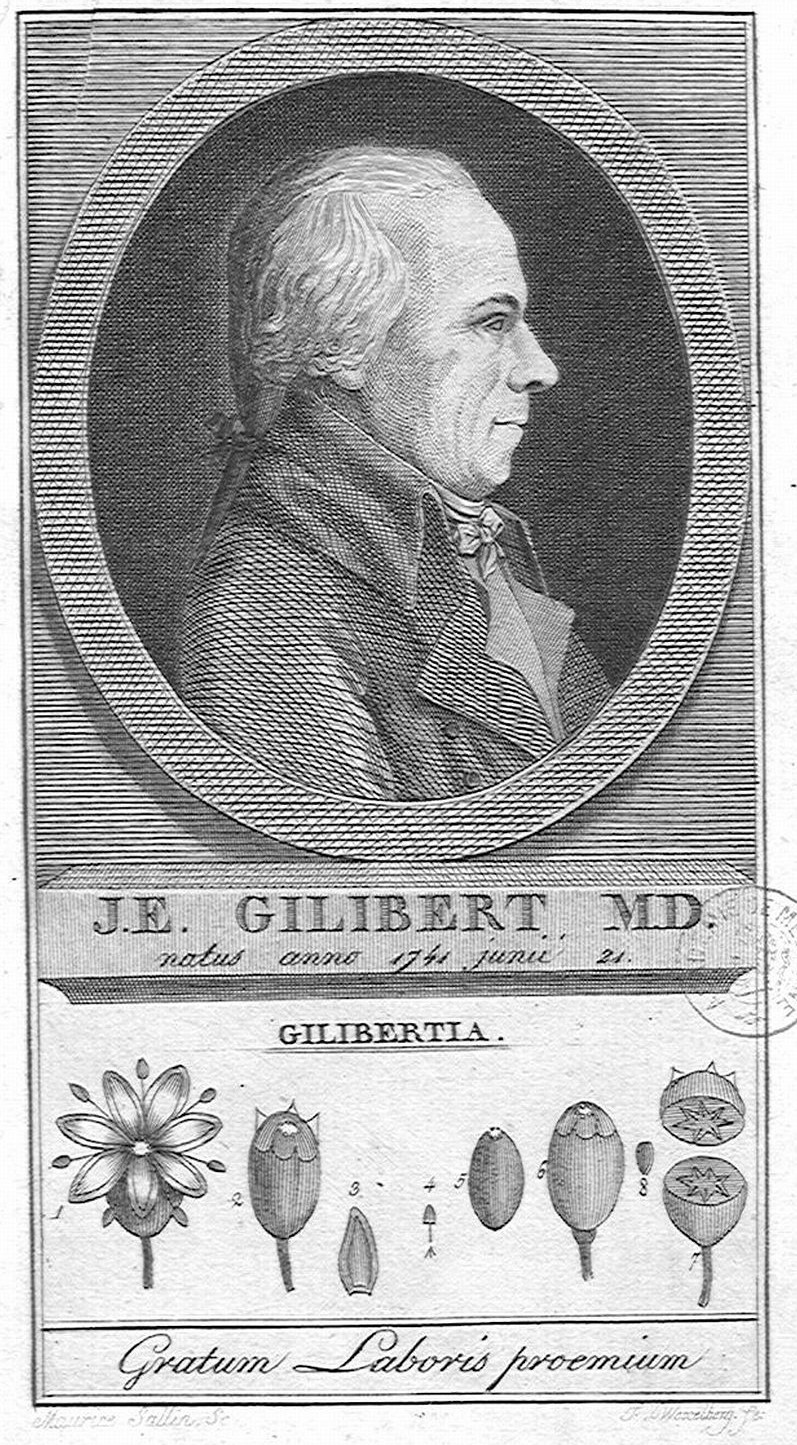

Jean-Emmanuel Gilibert (21 June 1741 in Lyon – 2 September 1814 in Lyon) was a French politician, botanist, freemason, medical doctor and member of the Academy of Sciences, Humanities and Arts of Lyon.

== Bibliography ==
The standard author abbreviation Gilib. is used to indicate this person as the author when citing a botanical name.

- Dictionnaire historique de Lyon, Éditions Stéphane Bachès, 2009. p. 562.
- Piotr Daszkiewicz (2004). « Sur les forêts de Lithuanie » (1784), Un texte oublié de Jean-Emmanuel Gilibert. Cahiers lituaniens, 5 : 21-27.
- Adrien Davy de Virville (ed.) (1955). Histoire de la botanique en France. SEDES (Paris) : 394 p.
- Jules Guiart, La vie extraordinaire d’Emmanuel Gilibert, médecin et botaniste lyonnais, dans Biologie médicale, revue des sciences biologiques considérées dans leurs rapports avec la médecine, vol.34, 42/43e années, n°10-12, octobre-novembre-décembre 1945, pp. 164–190
