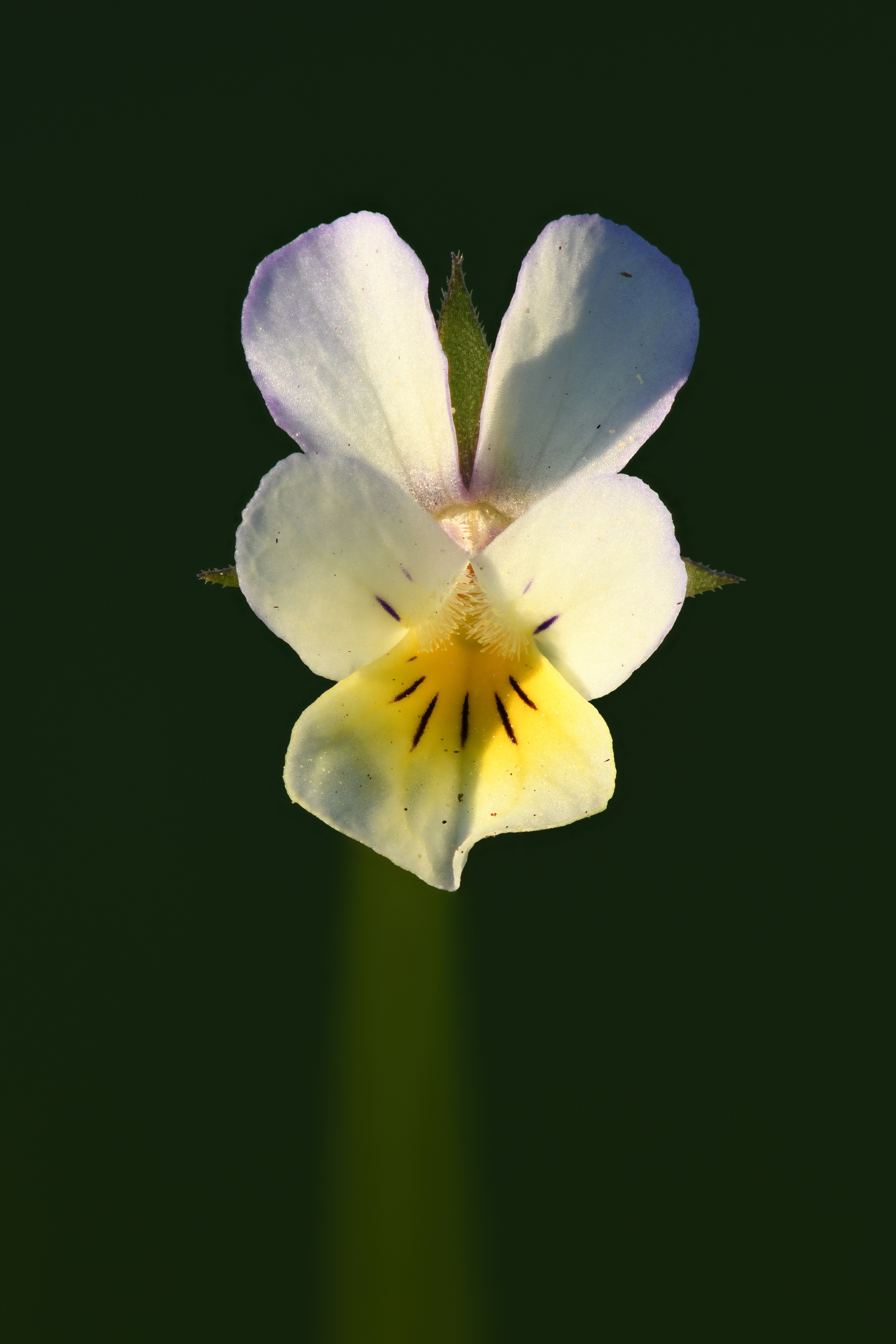

Scientific classification
- Kingdom: Plantae
- Clade: Tracheophytes
- Clade: Angiosperms
- Clade: Eudicots
- Clade: Rosids
- Order: Malpighiales
- Family: Violaceae
- Genus: Viola
- Species: V. arvensis

Binomial name
- Viola arvensis Murray

= Viola arvensis =

Field pansy

Species of flowering plant

Flower and leaves

Viola arvensis is a species of violet known by the common name field pansy. It is native to Europe, western Asia, and North Africa, and it is known on other continents as an introduced species and a weed of disturbed and cultivated areas.

Viola arvensis was shown to contain cyclotides, a class of peptides found in plants. The peptide cycloviolacin O2 in particular has shown to possess cytotoxic activity against human cancer cells and is therefore looked at as a potential drug lead.

== Description ==
It is an herbaceous annual plant with serrated leaves, and usually flowers with white all over, except the bottom petal (Although there are actually flowers with a tinge of purple at the top) and dehiscent capsules. It reproduces by seed. It grows 20 centimeters (7.9 in) tall.
