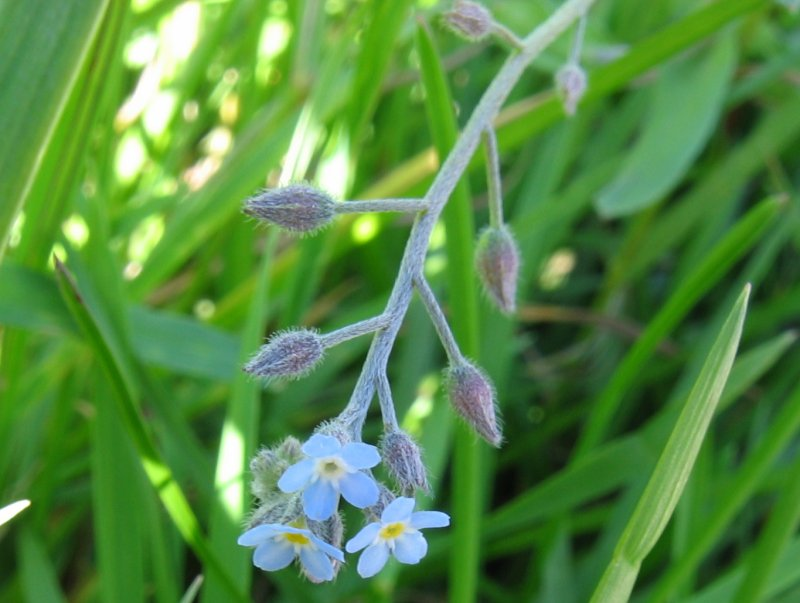

Scientific classification
- Kingdom: Plantae
- Clade: Tracheophytes
- Clade: Angiosperms
- Clade: Eudicots
- Clade: Asterids
- Order: Boraginales
- Family: Boraginaceae
- Genus: Myosotis
- Species: M. arvensis

Binomial name
- Myosotis arvensis (L.) Hill

Subspecies and varieties
- Myosotis arvensis subsp. arvensis; Myosotis arvensis var. garciasii O.Bolòs & Vigo; Myosotis arvensis subsp. umbrata (Rouy) O.Schwartz

Synonyms
- Myosotis scorpioides var. arvensis L.; Myosotis scorpioides subsp. arvensis (L.) Ehrh.

= Myosotis arvensis =

Species of flowering plant

Myosotis arvensis or field forget-me-not is a herbaceous annual to short lived perennial flowering plant in the family Boraginaceae. It is native to Europe, Turkey, the Caucasus, Siberia, the western Himalayas, and northwestern Africa. The plant is annual to perennial, erect, to 40 centimetres (16 in) and patent-hairy (hairs more-or-less at right-angles to the stem). The flowers are grey-blue, 3–5 millimetres (1/8–13/64 in) across, saucer shaped in profile, the sepal tube with hooked hairs. The mature fruits are dark brown, shiny nutlets. In the British Isles the plant is an archaeophyte, common throughout the isles on open, well-drained ground.

Two subspecies and one variety are accepted.

- Myosotis arvensis subsp. arvensis – Europe to Siberia, Turkey, the Caucasus, Western Himalayas, and northwestern Africa
- Myosotis arvensis var. garciasii O.Bolòs & Vigo – Balearic Islands
- Myosotis arvensis subsp. umbrata (Rouy) O.Schwartz – western and southern Europe from Norway to Italy, Portugal, the British Isles, and Iceland, and Romania

== Gallery ==
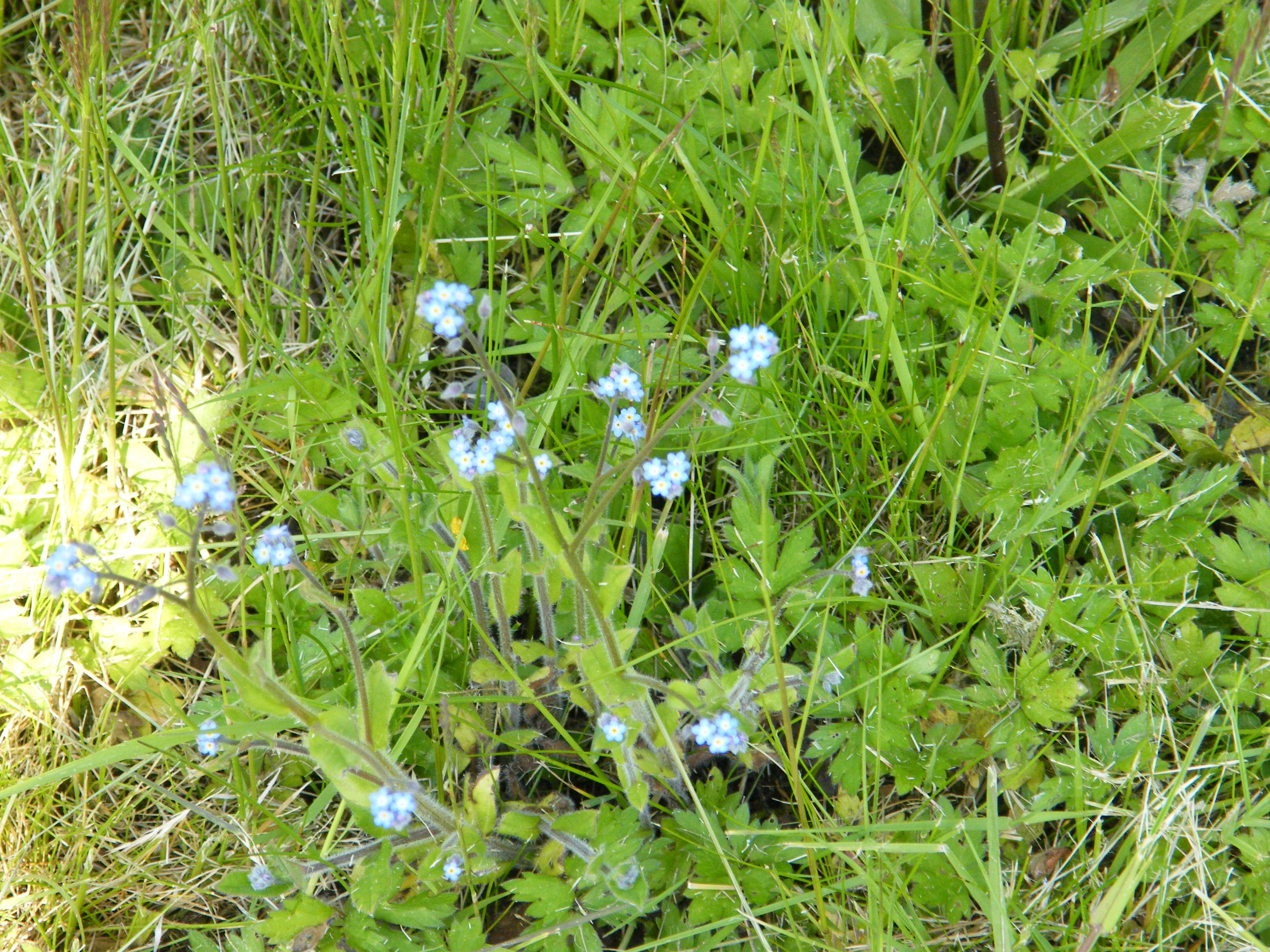
General view

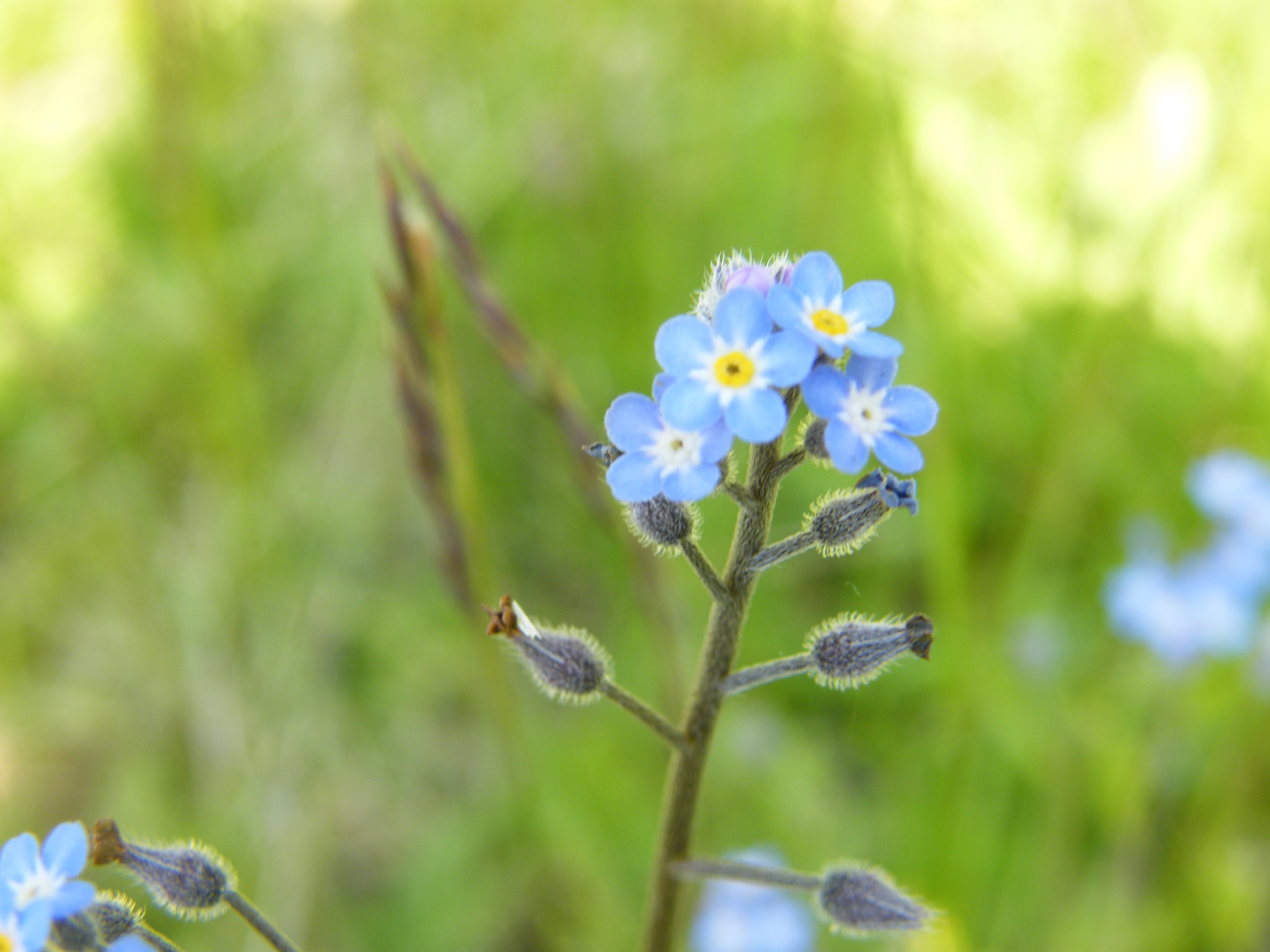
Flower head

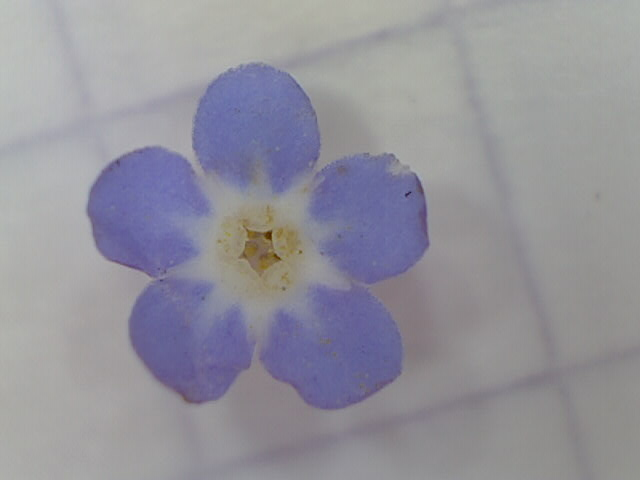
Close up of flower; the background squares are 5mm across

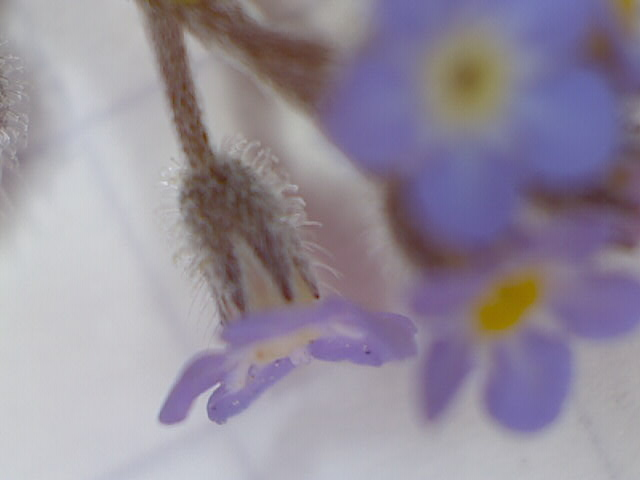
Close up showing sepal tube; the background squares are 5 millimetres (13/64 in) across

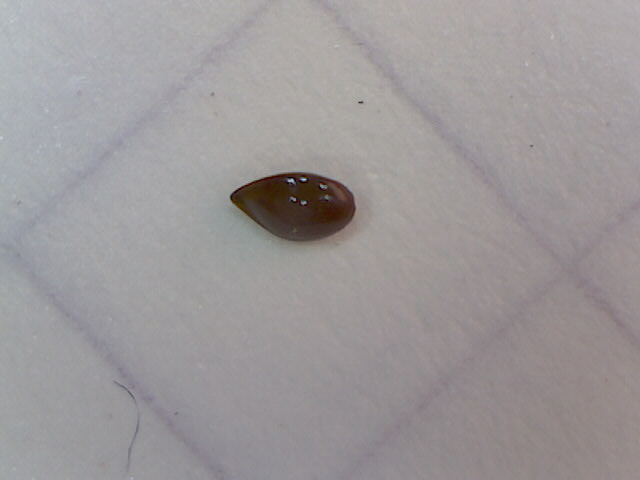
Mature fruit - side 1; the background squares are 5 millimetres (13/64 in) across

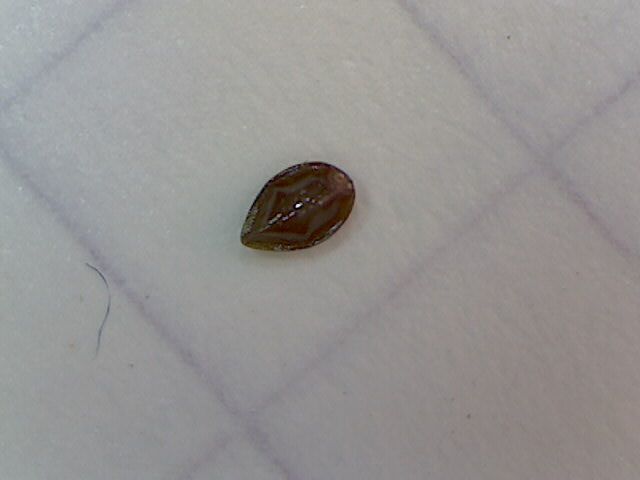
Mature fruit - side 2; the background squares are 5 millimetres (13/64 in) across

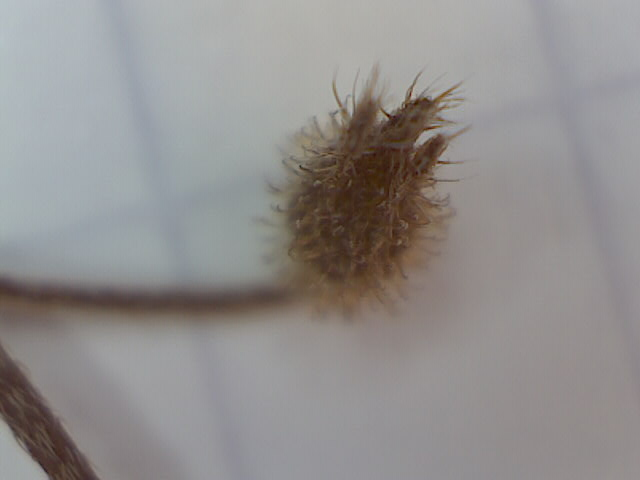
Mature calyx showing fruit is hidden inside; the background squares are 5 millimetres (13/64 in) across

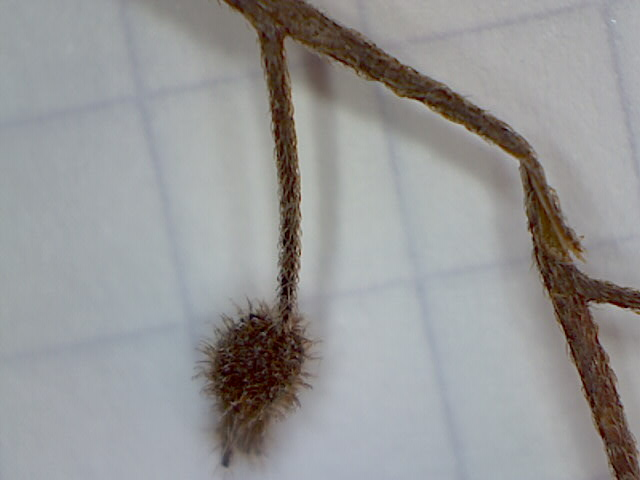
Mature calyx showing calyx stalk longer than sepal tube; the background squares are 5 millimetres (13/64 in) across

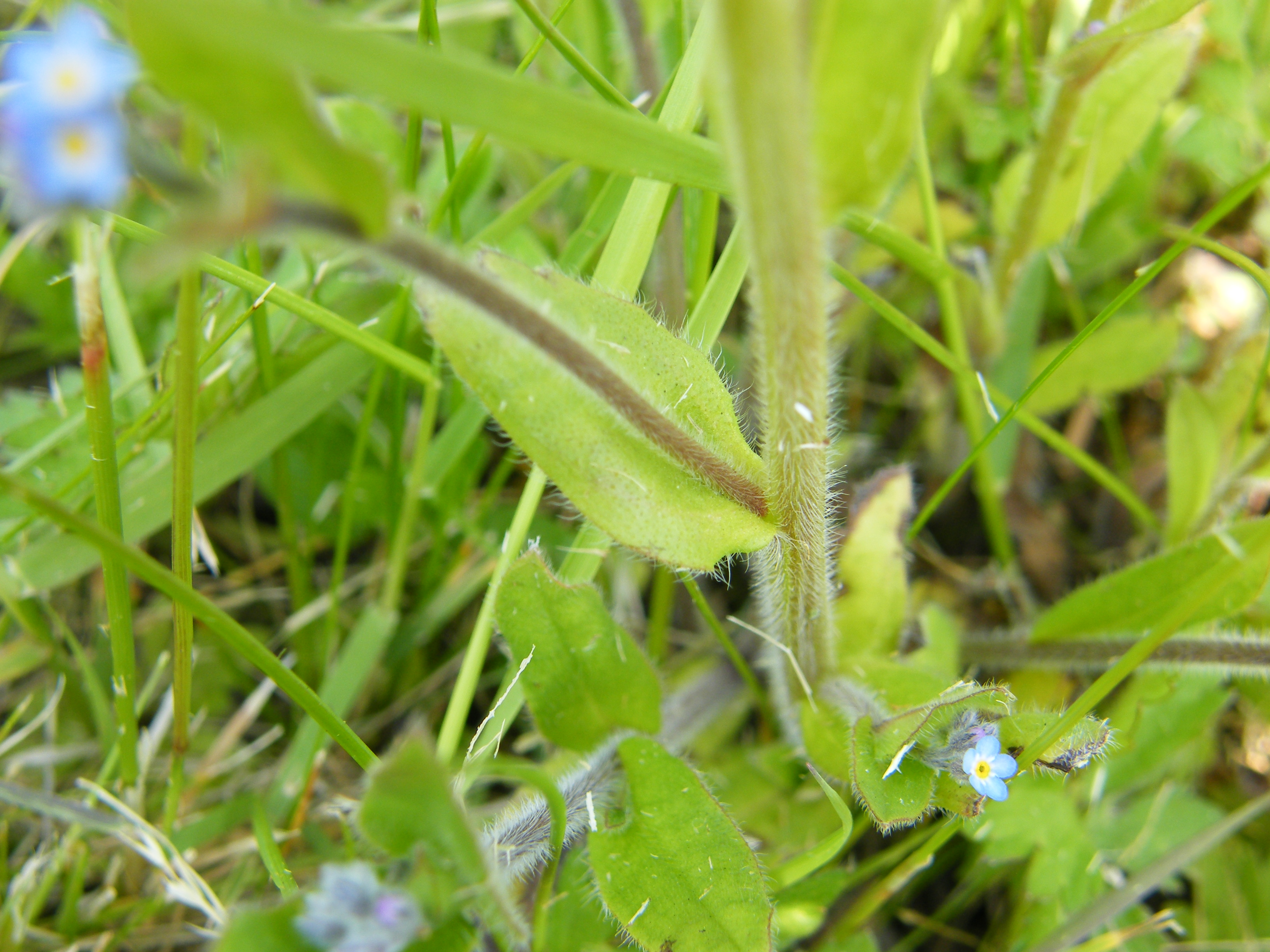
Close up showing non-basal leaf
