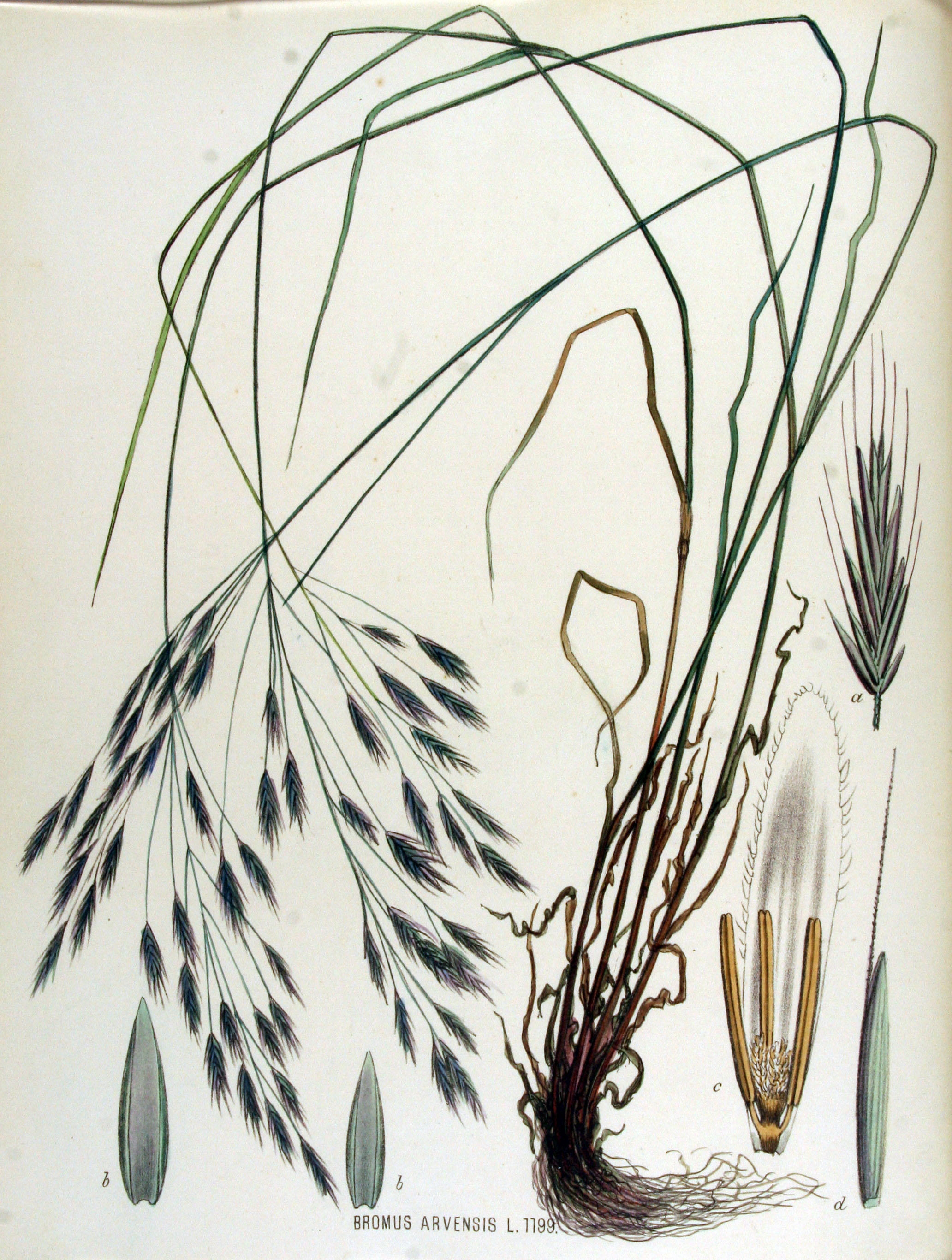

Scientific classification
- Kingdom: Plantae
- Clade: Tracheophytes
- Clade: Angiosperms
- Clade: Monocots
- Clade: Commelinids
- Order: Poales
- Family: Poaceae
- Subfamily: Pooideae
- Genus: Bromus
- Species: B. arvensis

Binomial name
- Bromus arvensis L.

= Bromus arvensis =

Species of grass

Bromus arvensis, the field brome, is a brome grass native to Europe and Asia. The specific epithet arvensis is Latin, meaning "of cultivated land".

== Description ==
Bromus arvensis is an annual or biennial grass with erect culms growing 0.3–0.9 m (1 ft 0 in – 2 ft 11 in) tall. The grass has an extensive fibrous root system. The leaf sheaths are softly pubescent and leaf blades are pubescent on both faces. The leaf blades are 10–20 cm (3.9–7.9 in) long and 2–6 mm (0.079–0.236 in) wide. The obtuse ligules are 1–1.5 mm (0.039–0.059 in) long. The large, open panicles are 10–30 m (33–98 ft) long and 4–20 cm (1.6–7.9 in) wide, with ascending branches that droop at their ends. The straight or slightly curved branches are typically longer than the spikelets. The lanceolate spikelets are 1.5–3 cm (0.59–1.18 in) long and become purplish at maturity. The spikelets have long pedicels and are five to twelve flowered. The bases of florets can be concealed or obvious at maturity. The glumes are glabrous. The lower glumes are three-veined and 4–6 mm (0.16–0.24 in) long, and the upper glumes are five-veined and 5–8 mm (0.20–0.31 in) long. The obtuse and glabrous or slightly scabrous lemmas are 7–8 mm (0.28–0.31 in) long and 1.1–1.5 mm (0.043–0.059 in) wide, and have seven faint nerves. The margins are translucent and end in lengthy and acute teeth. The awns are straight and 7–10 mm (0.28–0.39 in) long. The anthers are approximately 4 mm (0.16 in) long. The caryopses are shorter than the paleas and can be either weakly or strongly rolled inwards.

The grass flowers in June and July.

== Habitat and distribution ==
Bromus arvensis grows along roadsides, in disturbed areas, and in fields. It is native to southern and central Europe, but is now naturalized as a weed throughout temperate regions including North America and Asia. The grass is a soil improver and is useful for erosion control.
