= Primskovo =

- Location in Slovenia
- Coordinates: 45°58′18.48″N 14°54′37.58″E
- Country: Slovenia
- Traditional region: Lower Carniola
- Statistical region: Central Slovenia
- Municipality: Šmartno pri Litiji

Area
  - Total: 2.14 km^{2} (0.83 sq mi)
- Elevation: 321.2 m (1,054 ft)

Population (2002)
  - Total: 27

Primskovo (pronounced [ˈpɾiːmskɔʋɔ]; German: Primskau) is a dispersed settlement in the Municipality of Šmartno pri Litiji in central Slovenia. The area is part of the historical region of Lower Carniola. The municipality is now included in the Central Slovenia Statistical Region.

Primskovo is also the name of the local parish church and the collective name for the area covering a number of settlements in the surrounding area, including Dolnji Vrh, Gornji Vrh, Gradišče, Ježce, Kamni Vrh pri Primskovem, Mihelca, Mišji Dol, Poljane pri Primskovem, Sevno, Stara Gora, and Zagrič.
