= Trebanjski Vrh =

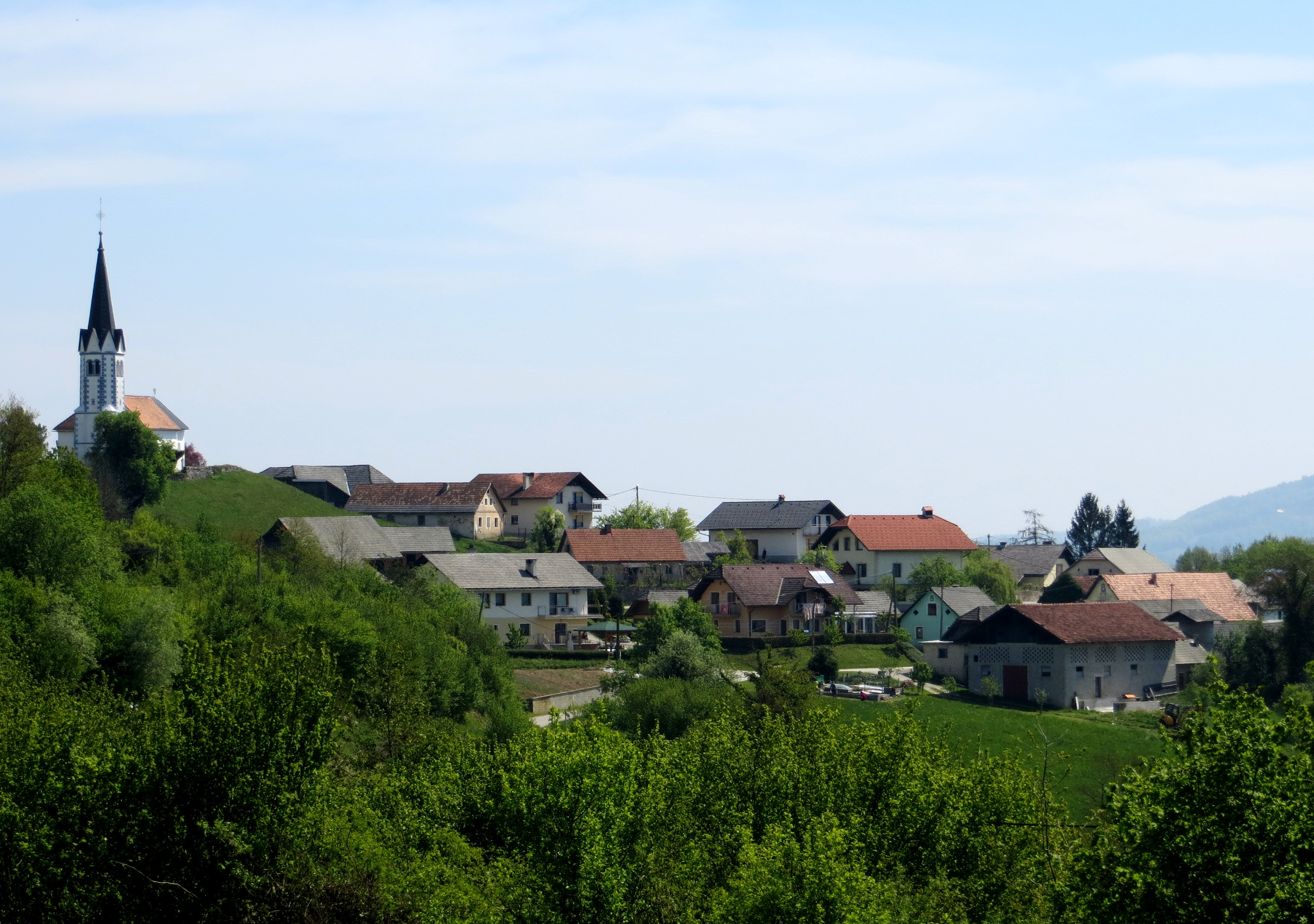

- Location in Slovenia
- Coordinates: 45°57′3.12″N 14°59′0.07″E
- Country: Slovenia
- Traditional region: Lower Carniola
- Statistical region: Southeast Slovenia
- Municipality: Trebnje

Area
  - Total: 1.57 km^{2} (0.61 sq mi)
- Elevation: 388.3 m (1,274 ft)

Population (2002)
  - Total: 43

Trebanjski Vrh (pronounced [tɾɛˈbaːnski ˈʋəɾx]) is a settlement in the Municipality of Trebnje in eastern Slovenia. The area is part of the historical region of Lower Carniola. The municipality is now included in the Southeast Slovenia Statistical Region.

== Mass grave ==
Trebanjski Vrh is the site of a mass grave from the period immediately after the Second World War. The Roje Cave 1 Mass Grave (Slovene: Grobišče Rojska jama 1) is located along the road between Roje pri Čatežu and Čatež. It is a 10-meter (33 ft) deep shaft containing the remains of about 10 Slovenes from the vicinity of Roje pri Čatežu. The Yugoslav secret police (OZNA) arrested them in the first few months after the war and murdered them in the cave.

== Church ==
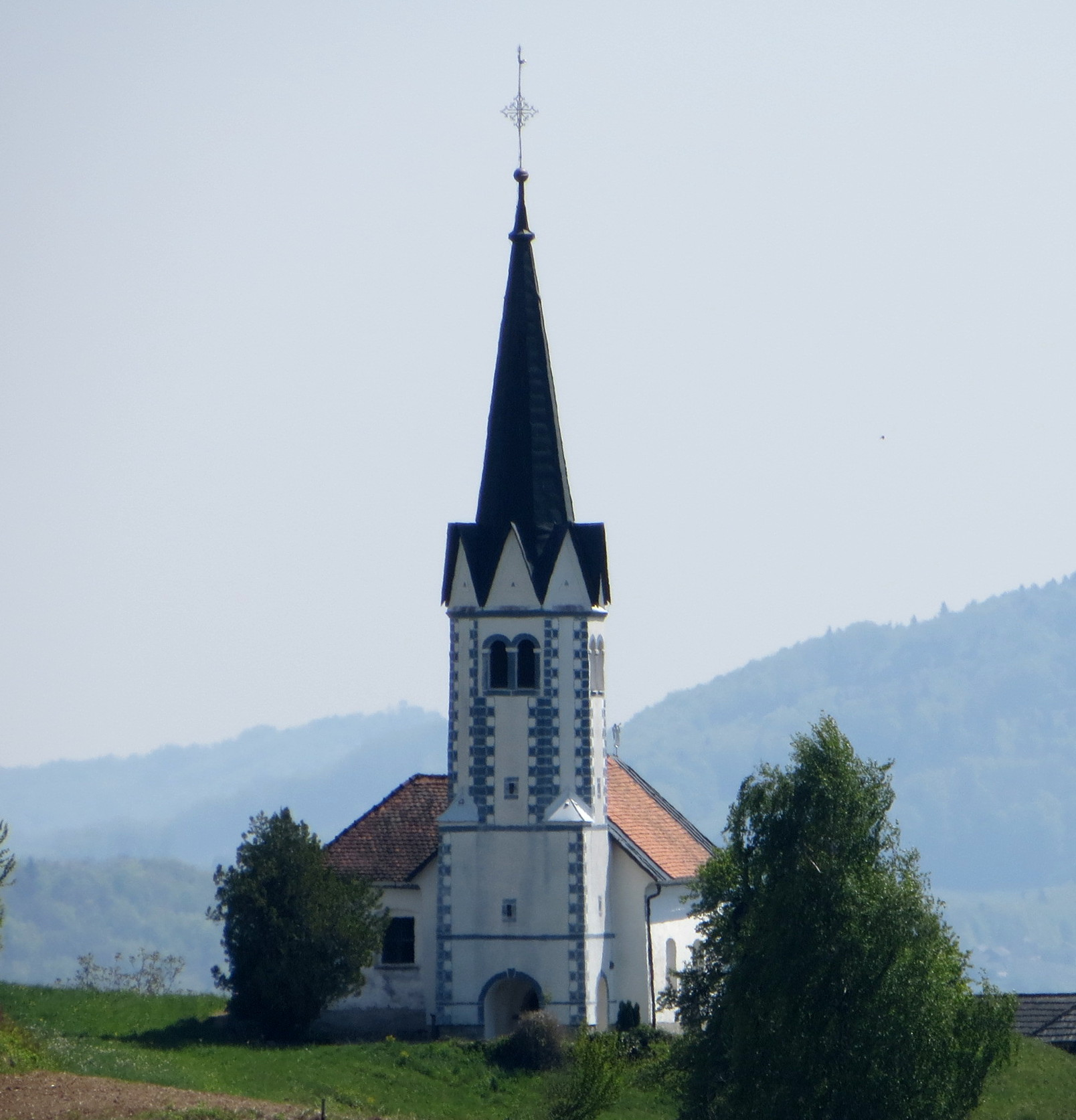
Saint Bartholomew's Church

The local church is dedicated to Saint Bartholomew (Slovene: sveti Jernej) and belongs to the Parish of Čatež-Zaplaz. It is a Gothic building, with 17th- and 18th-century additions.
