= 2016 Alpine Skiing World Cup – Women's combined =

Alpine ski discipline year standings

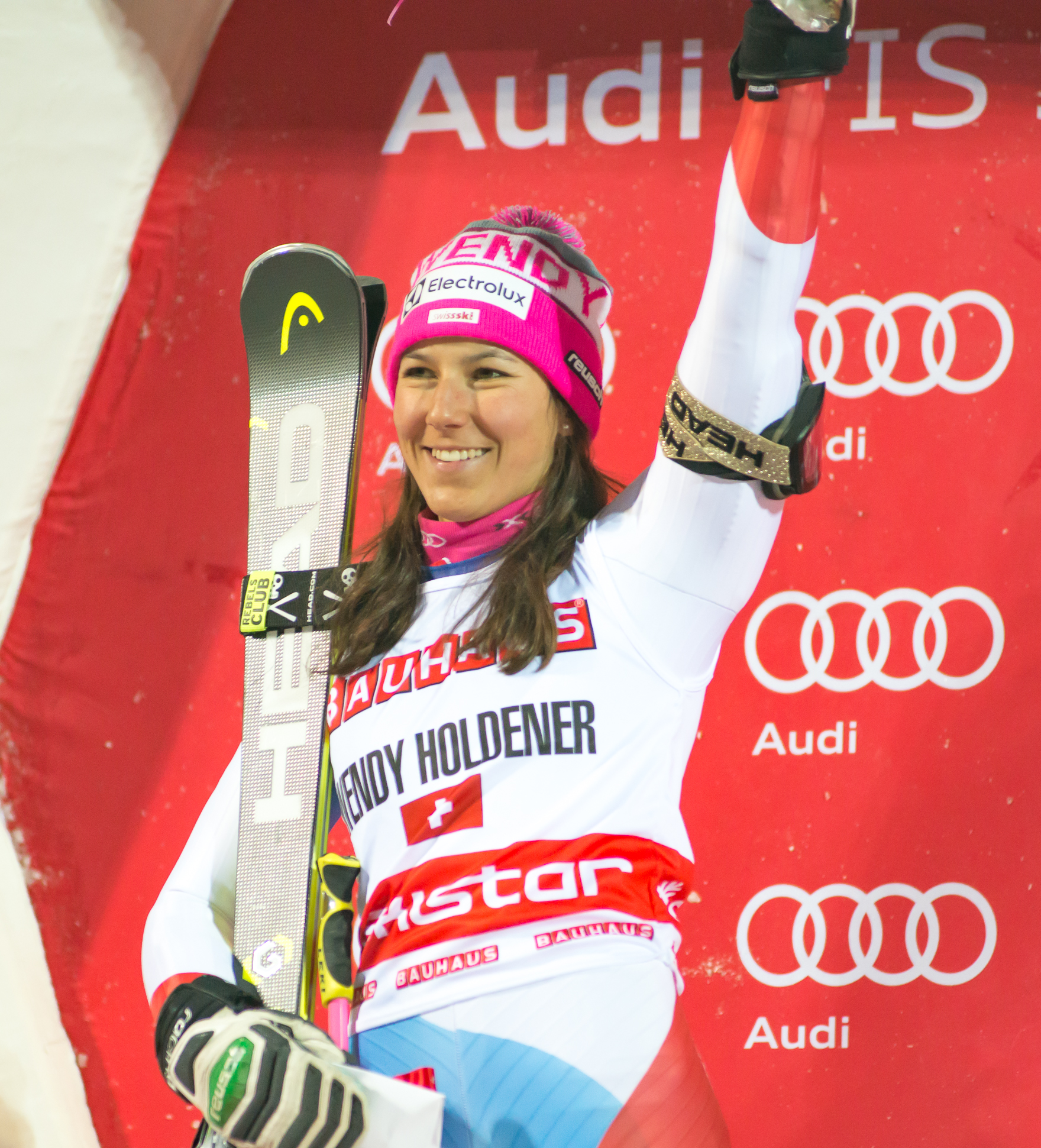
2016 Women's combined World Cup: Wendy Holdener of Switzerland, season champion; 2016 Women's World Cup; Overall • downhill • super-G; giant slalom • slalom • combined
Previous: 2015	Next: 2017

The Women's Combined competition in the 2016 FIS Alpine Skiing World Cup involved three events, first a super-combined (downhill and one run of slalom), and then two Alpine combined (a Super-G and one run of slalom). At that time, FIS rules stipulated that a minimum of three races in a discipline were necessary to award a crystal globe to the discipline champion. This was a change from previous seasons, where fewer than three races resulted in no crystal globe being awarded for the discipline.

2016 overall champion Lara Gut-Behrami of Switzerland won the super-combined but then lost the season combined championship (and the crystal globe) to her Swiss teammate Wendy Holdener, who placed first and second in the two Alpine combineds. However, Gut's third-place finish in the last race of the season, which was run in reverse order (slalom first, then Super-G), was sufficient for her to clinch the overall title for the season.

At this time, combined races were not included in the season finals, which were held in 2016 in St. Moritz, Switzerland.

== Standings ==
#	Skier	18 Dec 2015; Val d'Isère (France)	28 Feb 2016; Soldeu (Andorra)	13 Mar 2016; Lenzerheide (Switzerland)	Tot.
	(Switzerland) Wendy Holdener	18	80	100	198
2	(Switzerland) Lara Gut	100	DNF2	60	160
3	(Austria) Michaela Kirchgasser	60	13	80	153
4	(Canada) Marie-Michèle Gagnon	DNS	100	45	145
5	(France) Anne-Sophie Barthet	DNS	60	40	100
	(United States) Lindsey Vonn	80	20	DNS	100
7	(Italy) Johanna Schnarf	32	26	32	90
8	(Switzerland) Denise Feierabend	DNF2	22	50	72
9	(Norway) Ragnhild Mowinckel	40	7	22	69
10	(Italy) Francesca Marsaglia	36	DNF2	29	65
11	(France) Tessa Worley	20	18	24	62
12	(Switzerland) Rahel Kopp	DNS	45	16	61
13	(France) Margot Bailet	45	DNF2	13	58
14	(Slovenia) Maruša Ferk	50	4	DNF2	54
15	(Slovenia) Vanja Brodnik	26	12	15	53
16	(United States) Laurenne Ross	16	DNF2	36	52
17	(Italy) Federica Brignone	DNS	50	DNF2	50
18	(France) Romane Miradoli	7	40	DNF2	47
19	(Austria) Ricarda Haaser	DNS	18	26	44
	(Sweden) Kajsa Kling	15	11	18	44
21	(Switzerland) Michelle Gisin	22	DNS	20	42
22	(Austria) Stephanie Brunner	DNS	36	DNS	36
23	(Austria) Mirjam Puchner	12	9	11	32
	(Italy) Elena Curtoni	32	DNF2	DNS	32
	(United States) Mikaela Shiffrin	DNS	32	DNS	32
	References				

- Winner
- 2nd place
- 3rd place
- DNF1 = Did not finish run 1
- DNF2 = Did not finish run 2
- DNS = Did not start
- DSQ1 = Disqualified run 1
- DSQ2 = Disqualified run 2
- Updated at 21 March 2016, after all events.

== See also ==
- 2016 Alpine Skiing World Cup – Women's summary rankings
- 2016 Alpine Skiing World Cup – Women's overall
- 2016 Alpine Skiing World Cup – Women's downhill
- 2016 Alpine Skiing World Cup – Women's super-G
- 2016 Alpine Skiing World Cup – Women's giant slalom
- 2016 Alpine Skiing World Cup – Women's slalom
