= Mišji Dol =

- Location in Slovenia
- Coordinates: 45°59′12.87″N 14°53′58.92″E
- Country: Slovenia
- Traditional region: Lower Carniola
- Statistical region: Central Slovenia
- Municipality: Šmartno pri Litiji

Area
  - Total: 0.48 km^{2} (0.19 sq mi)
- Elevation: 351.1 m (1,152 ft)

Population (2002)
  - Total: 25

Mišji Dol (pronounced [ˈmiːʃji ˈdoːu̯]; German: Mausthal) is a small settlement in the Municipality of Šmartno pri Litiji in central Slovenia. It lies in the Primskovo area in the historical region of Lower Carniola. The municipality is now included in the Central Slovenia Statistical Region.

== Name ==
The settlement was first attested in German in 1341 as Mausental (literally, 'mouse valley'), semantically corresponding to the Slovene name. It is probably derived from a personal name, derived in turn from the common noun miš 'mouse' (cf. the modern Slovene surname Miš, literally 'mouse'), likely referring to an early inhabitant of the place (but cf. Jurklošter (formerly Mišji Dol) in the Municipality of Laško, literally 'monk valley'; mišji < meniški 'monk').

== Church ==
The local church is dedicated to Saint Lucy and belongs to the Parish of Primskovo na Dolenjskem. It dates to the 17th century.
