= Čateška Gora =

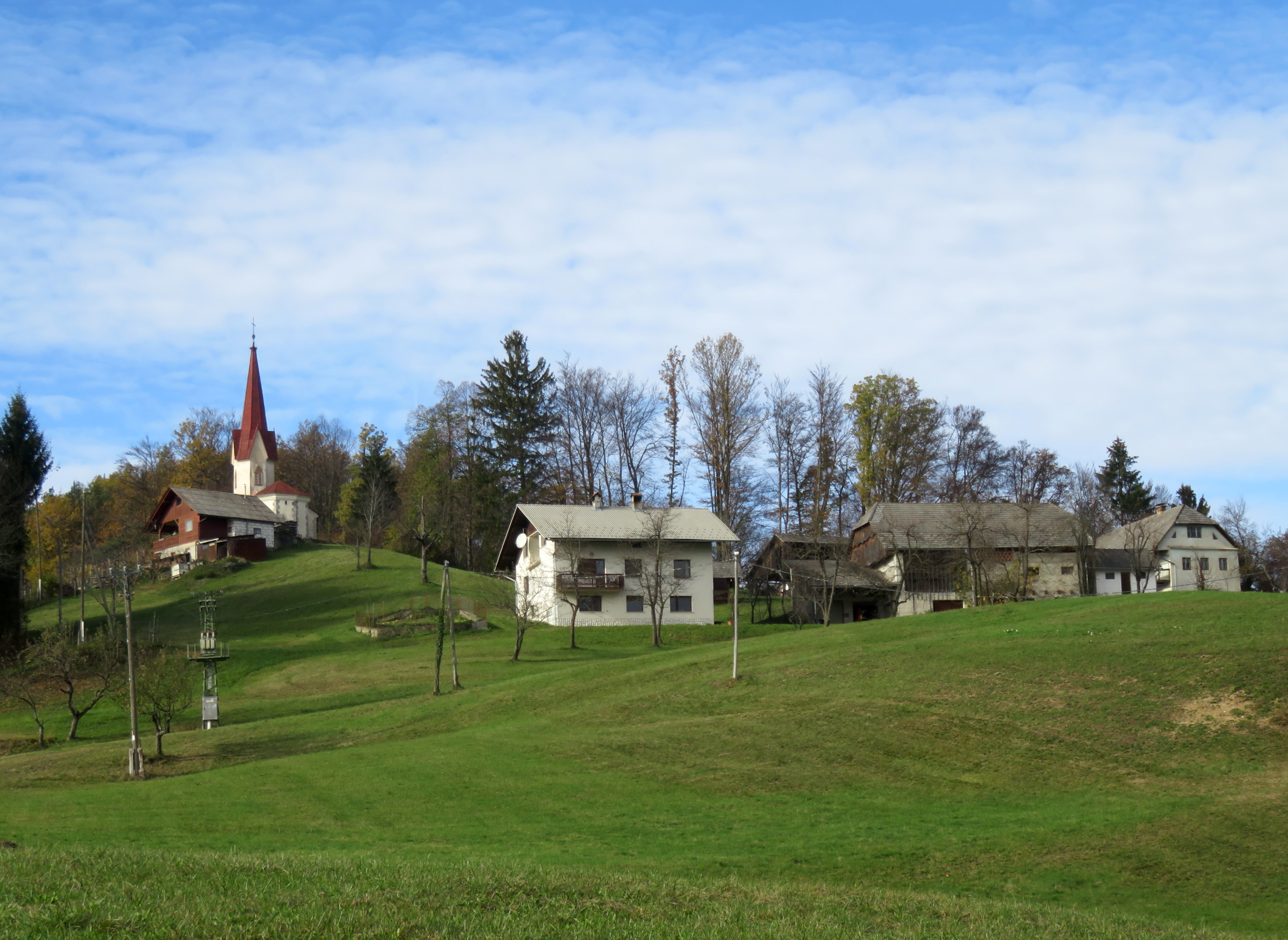

- Location in Slovenia
- Coordinates: 45°58′48.06″N 14°57′58.71″E
- Country: Slovenia
- Traditional region: Lower Carniola
- Statistical region: Central Sava
- Municipality: Litija

Area
  - Total: 1.39 km^{2} (0.54 sq mi)
- Elevation: 460.9 m (1,512 ft)

Population (2002)
  - Total: 22
- Postal code: 1274

Čateška Gora (pronounced [ˈtʃaːtɛʃka ˈɡɔːɾa]; in older sources also Čatežka Gora, German: Tschateschberg) is a settlement in the Municipality of Litija in central Slovenia. The area is part of the traditional region of Lower Carniola. It is now included with the rest of the municipality in the Central Sava Statistical Region; until January 2014 the municipality was part of the Central Slovenia Statistical Region.

The local church is dedicated to Saint Ulrich (Slovene: sveti Urh) and belongs to the Parish of Čatež–Zaplaz. It is a 16th-century building that was extended in the 18th century, when the new nave was built.
