= Kamni Vrh pri Primskovem =

- Location in Slovenia
- Coordinates: 45°58′56.45″N 14°56′28.57″E
- Country: Slovenia
- Traditional region: Lower Carniola
- Statistical region: Central Slovenia
- Municipality: Šmartno pri Litiji

Area
  - Total: 0.21 km^{2} (0.081 sq mi)
- Elevation: 495.4 m (1,625 ft)

Population (2002)
  - Total: 6

Kamni Vrh pri Primskovem (pronounced [ˈkaːmni ˈʋəɾx pɾi ˈpɾiːmskɔʋɛm]) is a small settlement in the hills southeast of Šmartno pri Litiji in central Slovenia. The surrounding area, known as Primskovo, is part of the historical region of Lower Carniola. The Municipality of Šmartno pri Litiji is now included in the Central Slovenia Statistical Region.
