= Sevno, Šmartno pri Litiji =

Sevno
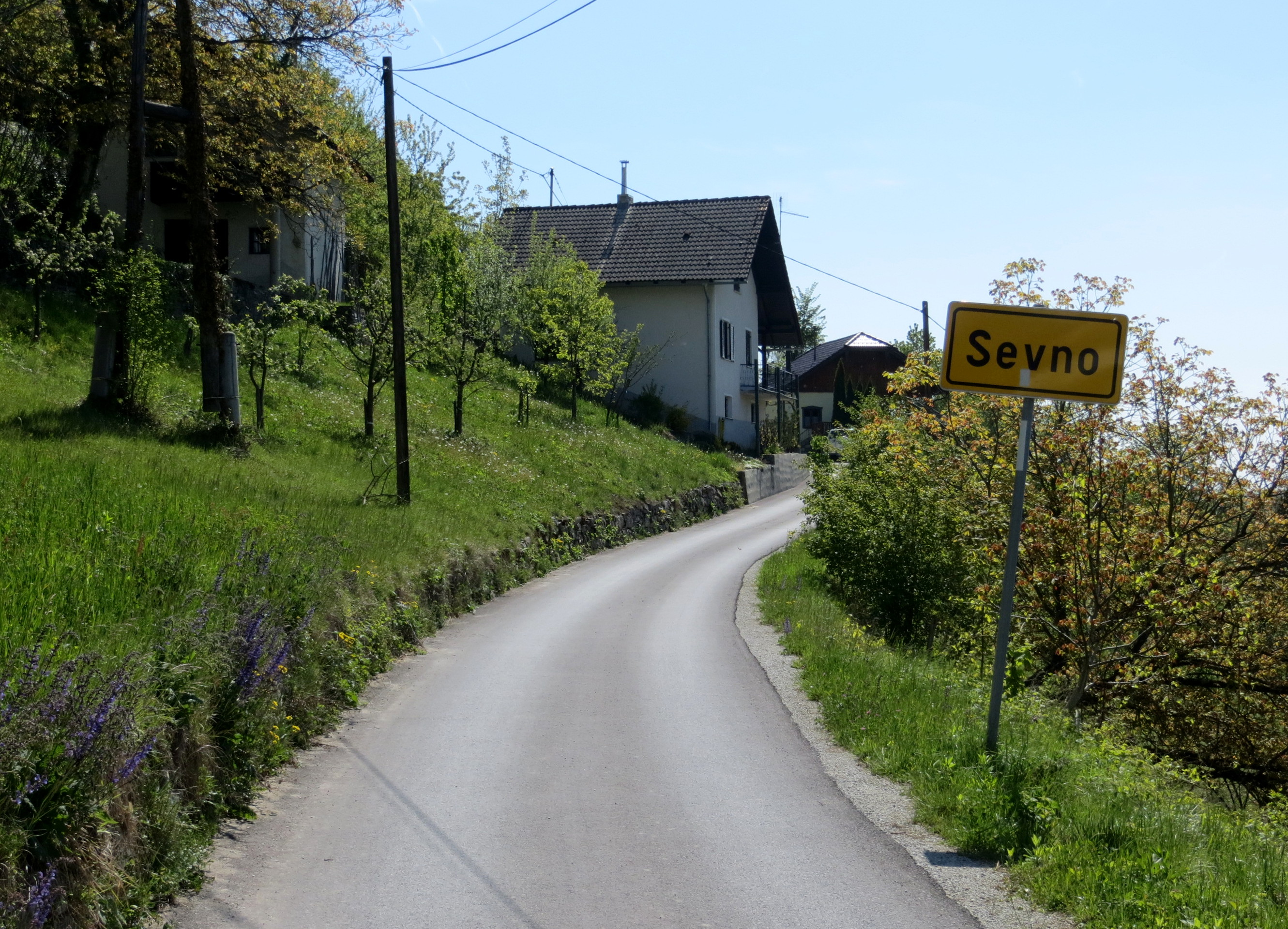

- Location in Slovenia
- Coordinates: 45°58′47.99″N 14°55′23.99″E
- Country: Slovenia
- Traditional region: Lower Carniola
- Statistical region: Central Slovenia
- Municipality: Šmartno pri Litiji

Area
  - Total: 1.11 km^{2} (0.43 sq mi)
- Elevation: 497.1 m (1,631 ft)

Population (2002)
  - Total: 47

Sevno (pronounced [ˈseːu̯nɔ]) is a small dispersed settlement in the Primskovo area near Šmartno pri Litiji in central Slovenia. The area is part of the historical region of Lower Carniola. The Municipality of Šmartno pri Litiji is included in the Central Slovenia Statistical Region.
