= Roje pri Čatežu =

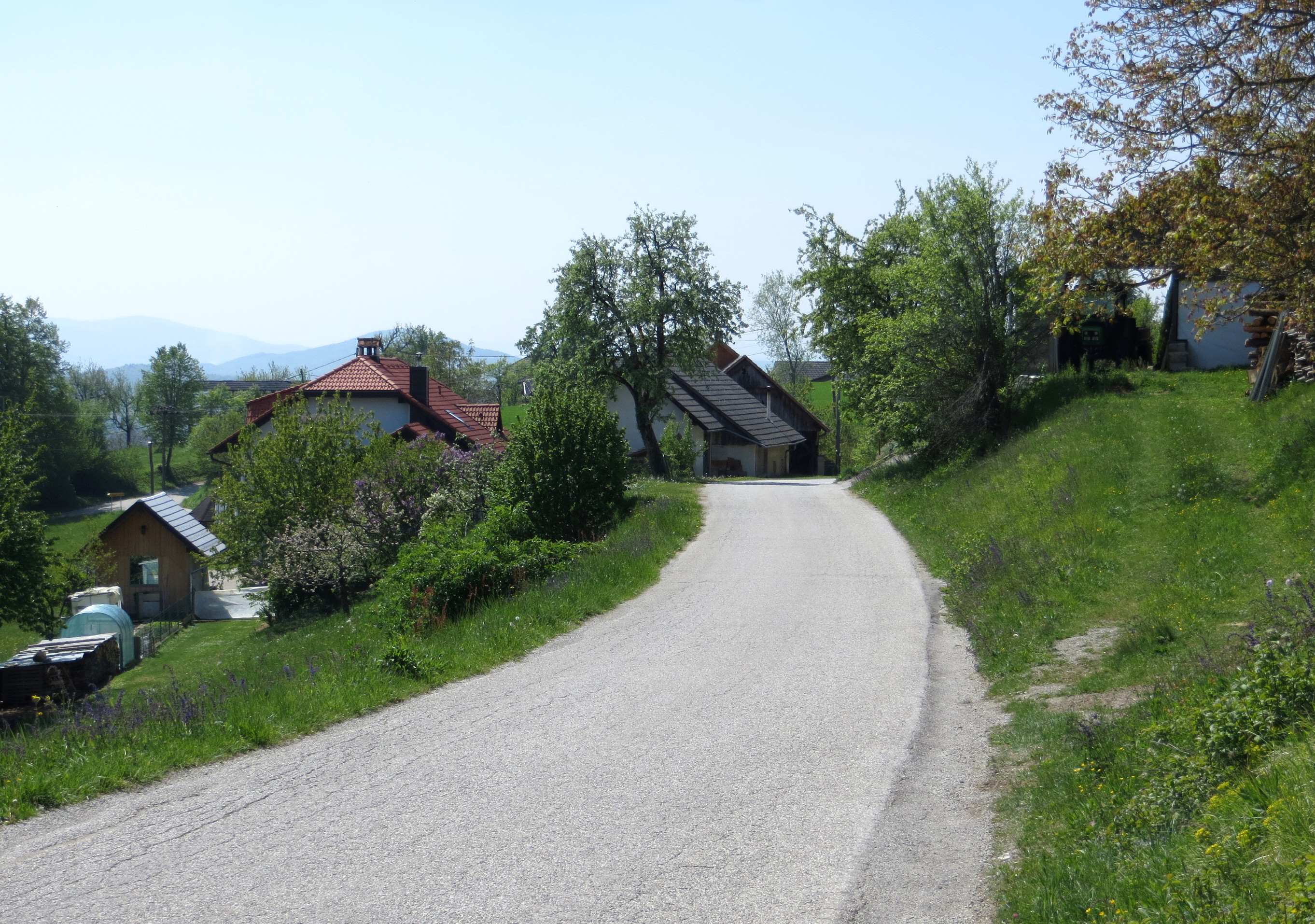

- Location in Slovenia
- Coordinates: 45°57′3.12″N 14°58′28.49″E
- Country: Slovenia
- Traditional region: Lower Carniola
- Statistical region: Southeast Slovenia
- Municipality: Trebnje

Area
  - Total: 0.8 km^{2} (0.31 sq mi)
- Elevation: 401.3 m (1,317 ft)

Population (2002)
  - Total: 52

Roje pri Čatežu (pronounced [ˈɾoːjɛ pɾi ˈtʃaːtɛʒu]) is a small settlement south of Čatež in the Municipality of Trebnje in Slovenia. The area is part of the traditional region of Lower Carniola and is now included in the Southeast Slovenia Statistical Region.

== Name ==
The name of the settlement was changed from Roje to Roje pri Čatežu in 1953.
