= Poljane pri Primskovem =

Poljane pri Primskovem Poljane pri Velikem Gabru (until 1955)
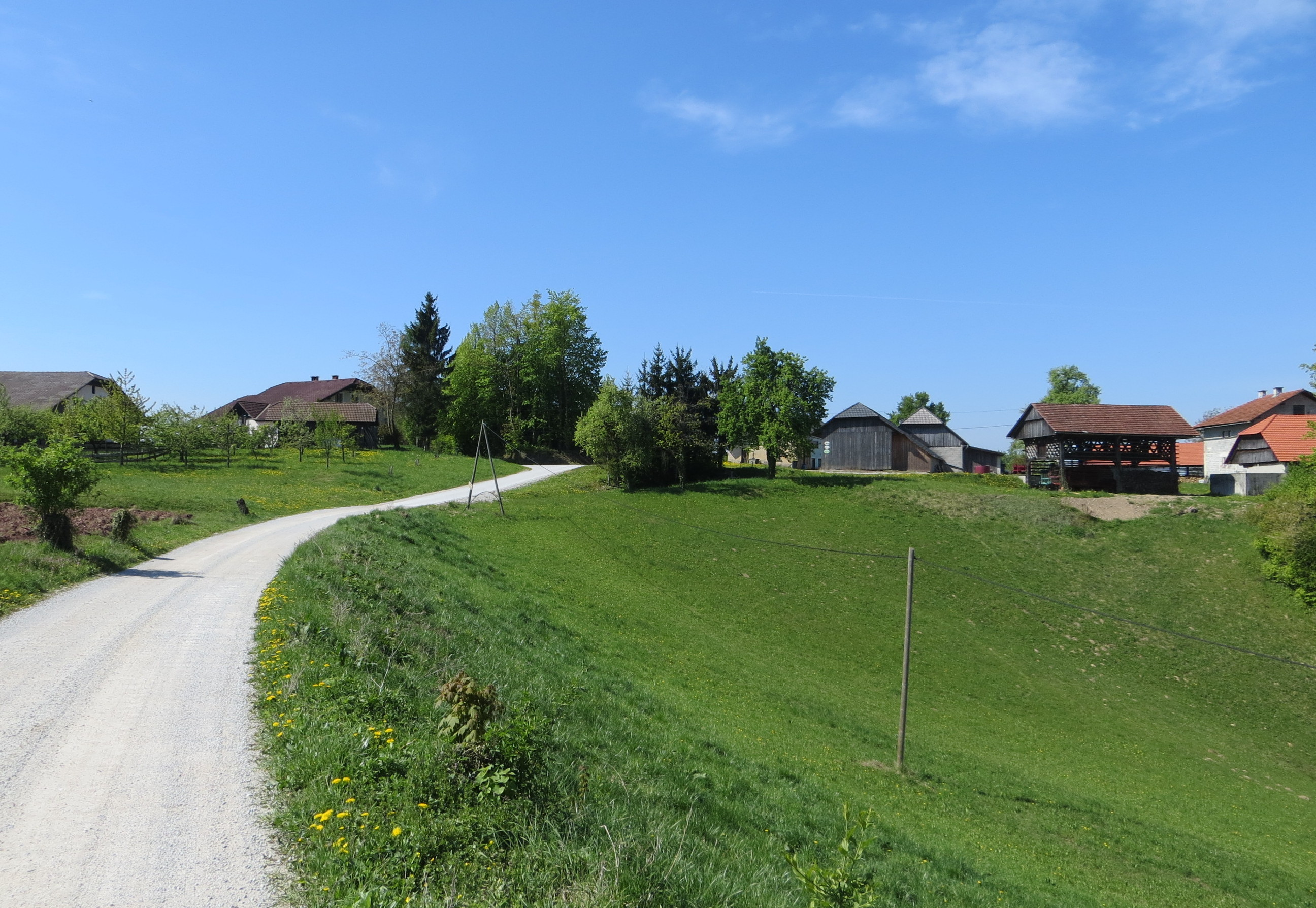

- Location in Slovenia
- Coordinates: 45°59′30.09″N 14°55′11.39″E
- Country: Slovenia
- Traditional region: Lower Carniola
- Statistical region: Central Slovenia
- Municipality: Šmartno pri Litiji

Area
  - Total: 1.75 km^{2} (0.68 sq mi)
- Elevation: 563.5 m (1,849 ft)

Population (2002)
  - Total: 24

Poljane pri Primskovem (pronounced [pɔˈljaːnɛ pɾi ˈpɾiːmskɔʋɛm]; German: Polane) is a small dispersed settlement in the Primskovo area in central Slovenia. It belongs to the Municipality of Šmartno pri Litiji. The area is part of the historical region of Lower Carniola. The municipality is now included in the Central Slovenia Statistical Region.

== Name ==
The name of the settlement was changed from Poljane pri Velikem Gabru to Poljane pri Primskovem in 1955. In the past the German name was Polane.
