= Mihelca =

- Location in Slovenia
- Coordinates: 45°58′52.12″N 14°53′45.49″E
- Country: Slovenia
- Traditional region: Lower Carniola
- Statistical region: Central Slovenia
- Municipality: Šmartno pri Litiji

Area
  - Total: 0.4 km^{2} (0.15 sq mi)
- Elevation: 439.3 m (1,441 ft)

Population (2002)
  - Total: 20

Mihelca (pronounced [miˈxeːu̯tsa]) is a small settlement in the Primskovo area of the Municipality of Šmartno pri Litiji in central Slovenia. The area is part of the historical region of Lower Carniola and is now included in the Central Slovenia Statistical Region.

A small chapel-shrine on Fat Hill (Slovene: Debeli hrib) in the settlement is dedicated to the Virgin Mary and dates to the late 18th century.
