= Ježce =

- Location in Slovenia
- Coordinates: 45°59′51.05″N 14°53′16.56″E
- Country: Slovenia
- Traditional region: Lower Carniola
- Statistical region: Central Slovenia
- Municipality: Šmartno pri Litiji

Area
  - Total: 1.57 km^{2} (0.61 sq mi)
- Elevation: 350.3 m (1,149 ft)

Population (2002)
  - Total: 28

Ježce (pronounced [ˈjeːʃtsɛ]) is a small settlement in the Primskovo area of the Municipality of Šmartno pri Litiji in central Slovenia. The area is part of the historical region of Lower Carniola. The municipality is now included in the Central Slovenia Statistical Region.

== Industry ==
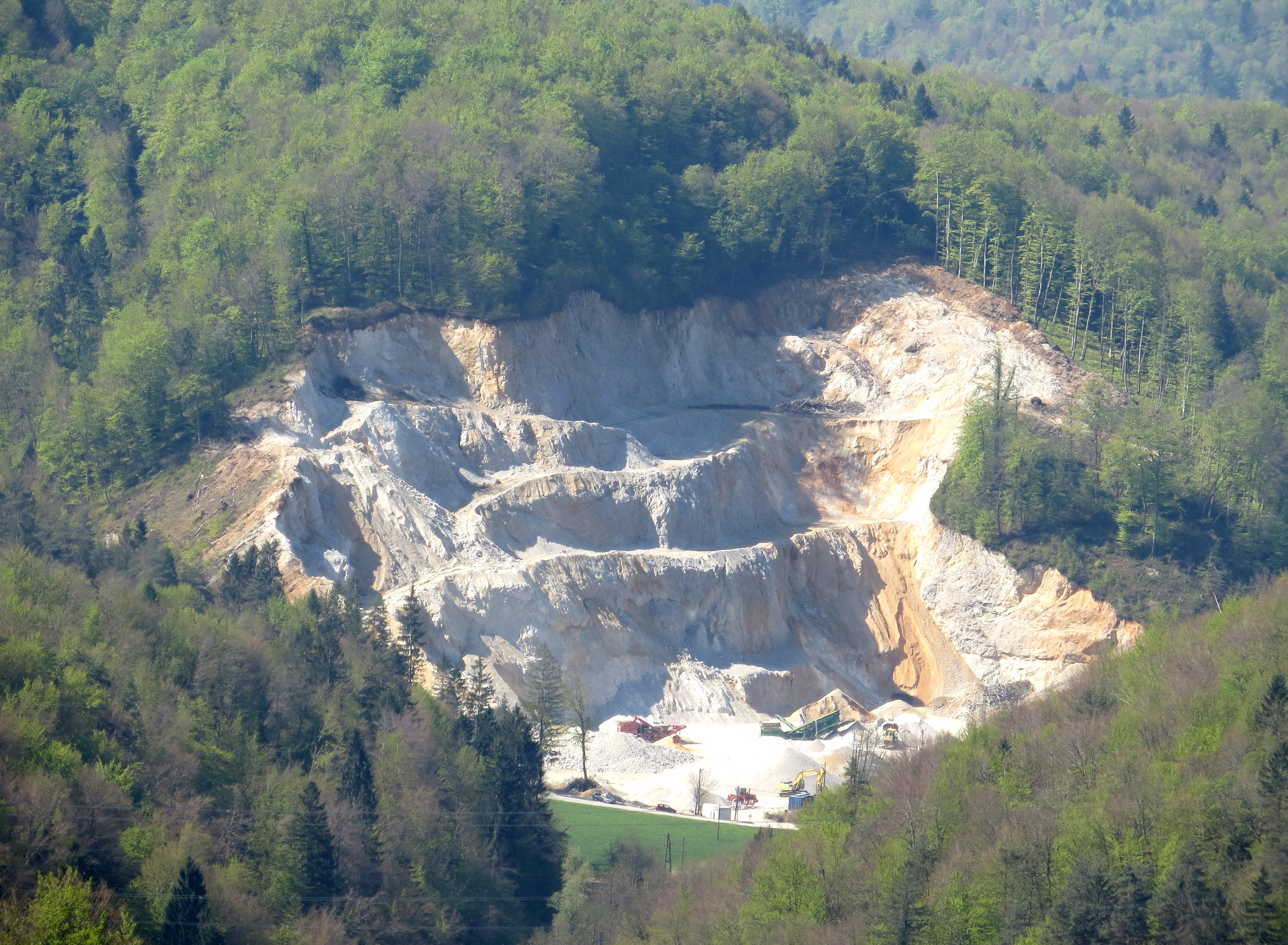
Quarry in Ježce

Ježce is known for its gravel pits. There are three large quarries in Ježce: two north of the village center, and a smaller one to the south.
