= Dolnji Vrh =

- Location in Slovenia
- Coordinates: 45°58′14.31″N 14°55′36.12″E
- Country: Slovenia
- Traditional region: Lower Carniola
- Statistical region: Central Slovenia
- Municipality: Šmartno pri Litiji

Area
  - Total: 1.2 km^{2} (0.46 sq mi)
- Elevation: 470.9 m (1,545 ft)

Population (2002)
  - Total: 26

Dolnji Vrh (pronounced [ˈdoːlnji ˈʋəɾx]; in older sources also Dolenji Vrh, German: Unterwerch) is a small settlement in the Municipality of Šmartno pri Litiji in central Slovenia. The area is part of the historical region of Lower Carniola. The municipality is now included in the Central Slovenia Statistical Region.

The local church is dedicated to John the Baptist and belongs to the Parish of Primskovo. It dates to the 16th century.
