= Razbore, Trebnje =

Razbore
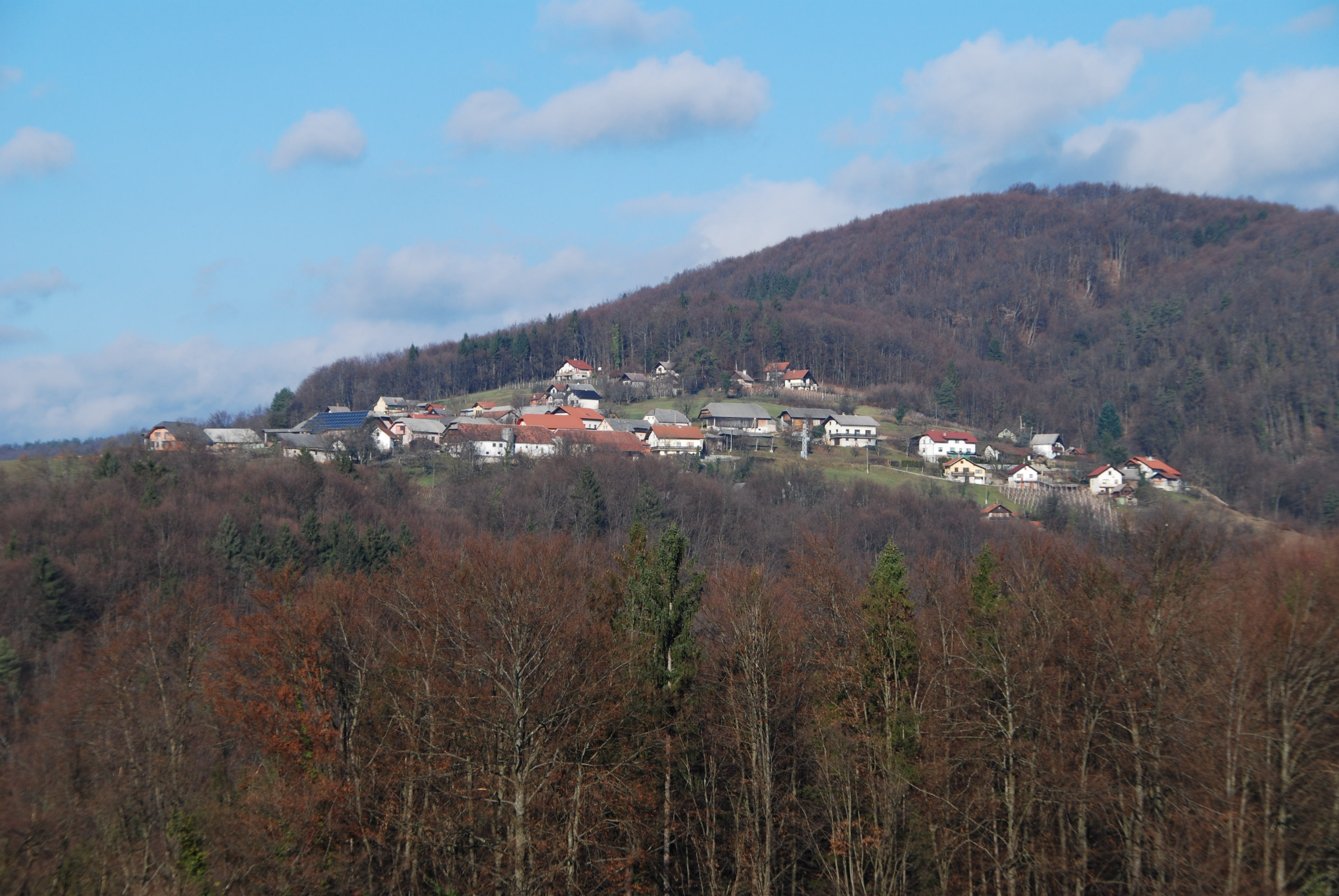

- Location in Slovenia
- Coordinates: 45°58′0.43″N 14°57′2.07″E
- Country: Slovenia
- Traditional region: Lower Carniola
- Statistical region: Southeast Slovenia
- Municipality: Trebnje

Area
  - Total: 2.67 km^{2} (1.03 sq mi)
- Elevation: 463.4 m (1,520 ft)

Population (2013)
  - Total: 44

Razbore (pronounced [ɾaˈzboːɾɛ]) is a settlement just west of Čatež in the Municipality of Trebnje in eastern Slovenia. The area is part of the traditional region of Lower Carniola. The municipality is now included in the Southeast Slovenia Statistical Region.

== Name ==
Razbore was attested in written sources in 1250 as Raswor and Rasswor (and as Rasebor in 1302). The original form of the name was *Razori, a plural form of the common noun razor 'dead furrow'. The name probably does not refer to agricultural activity, but is instead metaphorical, referring to split or fissured terrain. In the local dialect, the name underwent diphthongization followed by the phonological development v > b (known as betacizem in Slovene), and the masculine plural accusative (in -e) was then reanalyzed as a feminine plural nominative: thus *Razóri > Razu̯óri > *Razbóri > Razbóre. In 2013, the official name of the settlement was changed from Razbore – del (literally, 'part of Razbore') to Razbore. The change took place when a former part of Razbore known as Razbore – katastrska občina Poljane – del (literally, 'part of Razbore in the cadastral community of Poljane') was annexed by Gornji Vrh in the neighboring Municipality of Šmartno pri Litiji.

== Chapel-shrine ==
A small roadside chapel-shrine at the crossroads in the centre of the village was built in 1907.
