= Vanja Brodnik =

Slovenian alpine skier (born 1989)

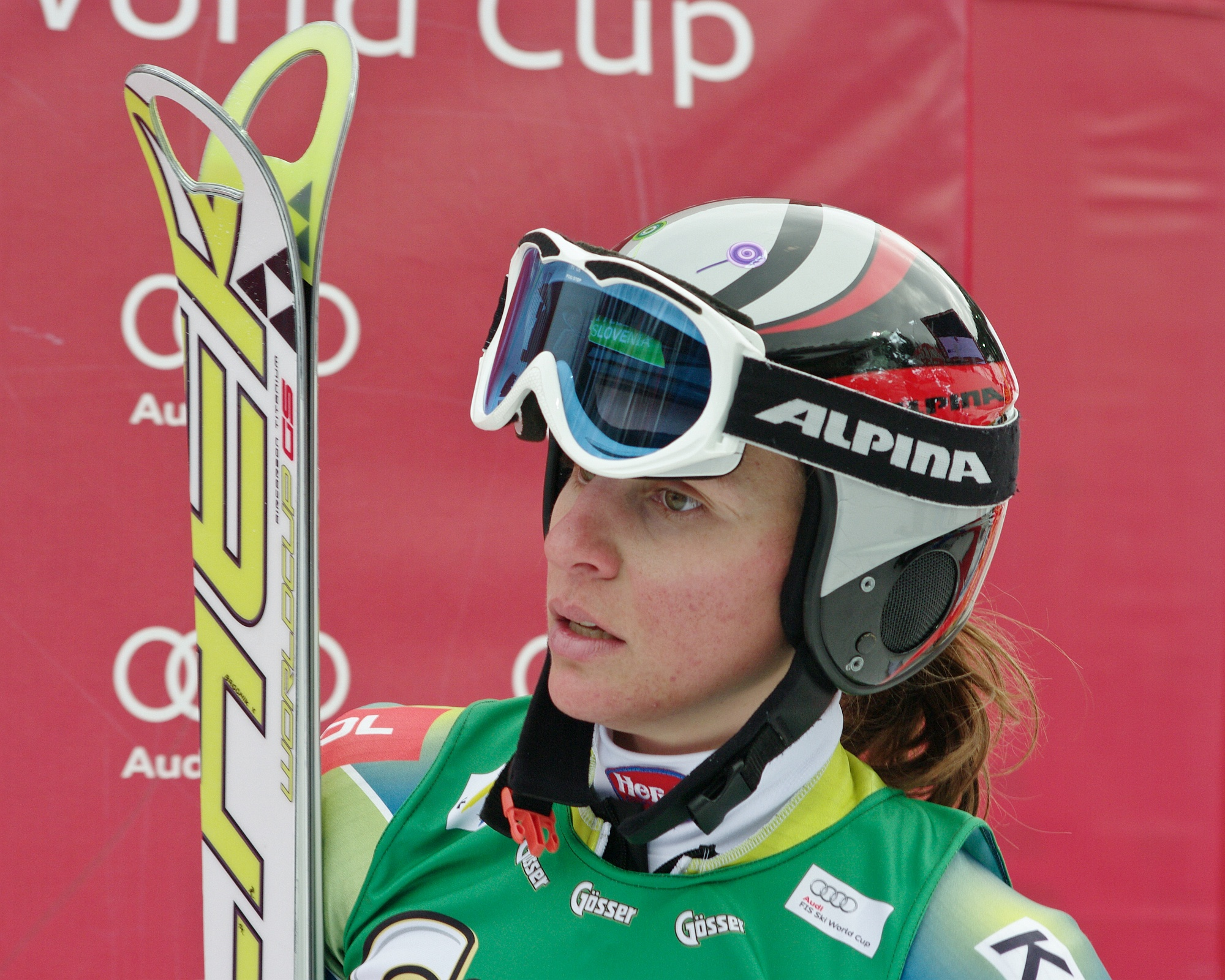
- Brodnik in 2010

Personal information
- Born: 13 March 1989 (age 37) Trebnje, SR Slovenia, Yugoslavia

Skiing career
- Sport: Alpine skiing

Vanja Brodnik (born March 13, 1989) is a Slovenian alpine ski racer from Trebanjski.

She competed at the 2015 World Championships in Beaver Creek, USA, in the Super-G.
