= Jurklošter =

Jurklošter Mišji Dol (until 1972)
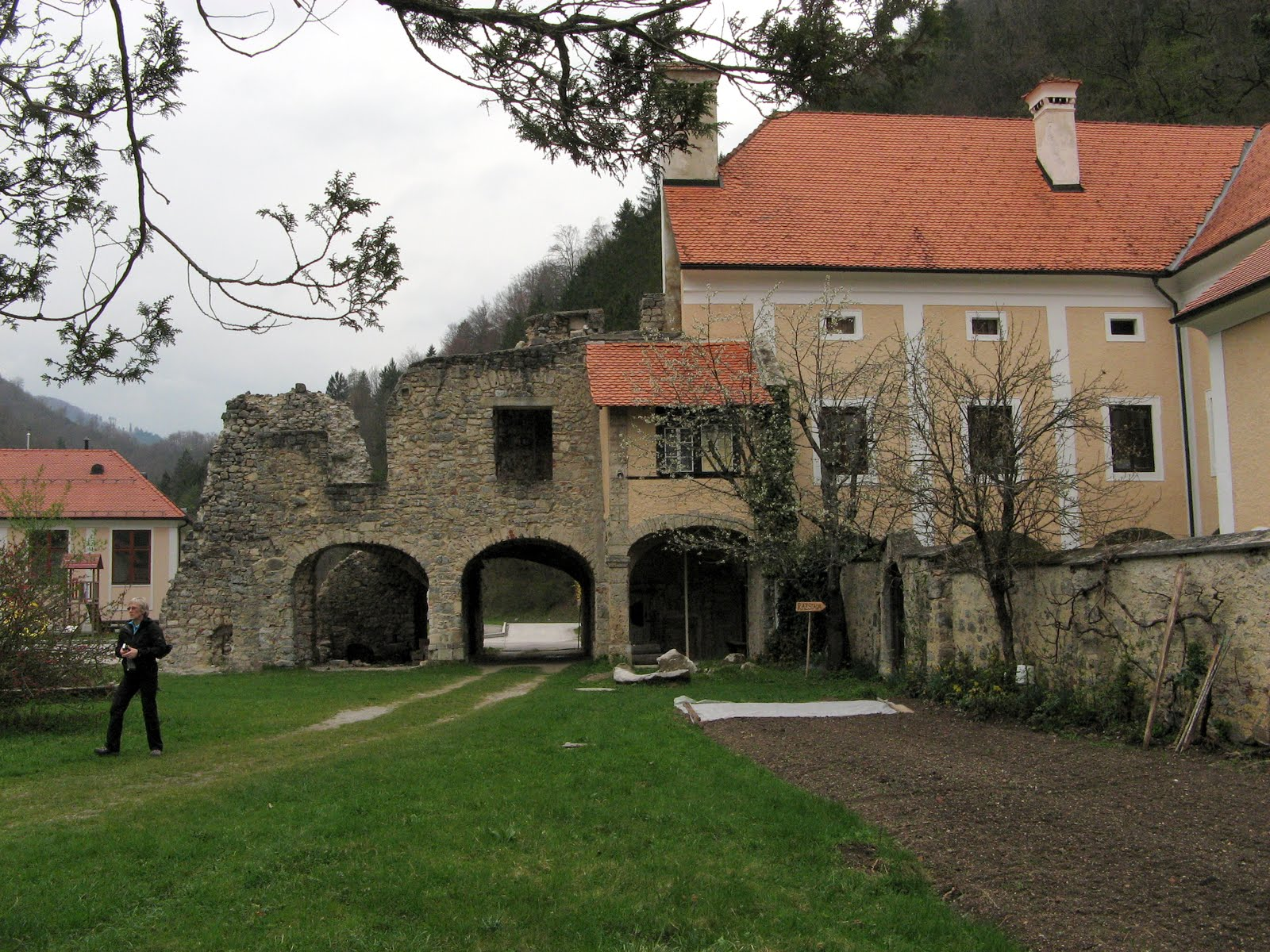

- Location in Slovenia
- Coordinates: 46°6′29.83″N 15°19′59.16″E
- Country: Slovenia
- Traditional region: Styria
- Statistical region: Savinja
- Municipality: Laško

Area
  - Total: 3.78 km^{2} (1.46 sq mi)
- Elevation: 574.5 m (1,885 ft)

Population (2002)
  - Total: 71
- Postal code: 3273

Jurklošter (pronounced [ˈjuːɾklɔʃtəɾ], in older sources Mišidol, German: Mischidol or Gairach) is a settlement in the Municipality of Laško in eastern Slovenia. The area is part of the traditional region of Styria. It is now included with the rest of the municipality in the Savinja Statistical Region.

== Name ==
The settlement was first attested around 1145 as Geyrowe (later forms: de Giurio, Gyriov, Geyrach), all referring to the Slovenian prefix Jur- '(Saint) George'. The suffix -klošter means 'monastery' and the name Jurklošter therefore refers to a religious edifice dedicated to Saint George. The pre-1972 name of the settlement, Mišji Dol, also refers to a monastery because it literally means 'monks' valley' (mišji < meniški 'monk') (but cf. Mišji Dol in the Municipality of Šmartno pri Litiji, literally 'mouse valley').

The name of the settlement was changed from Mišji Dol to Jurklošter in 1972.

== Cultural heritage ==
=== Charterhouse ===
It was the site of a large charterhouse (Carthusian monastery), of which the parish church, a later mansion, and a defence tower remain. The monastery was founded in the 12th century. The church is dedicated to Saint Maurice and belongs to the Roman Catholic Diocese of Celje.
