= Gornji Vrh =

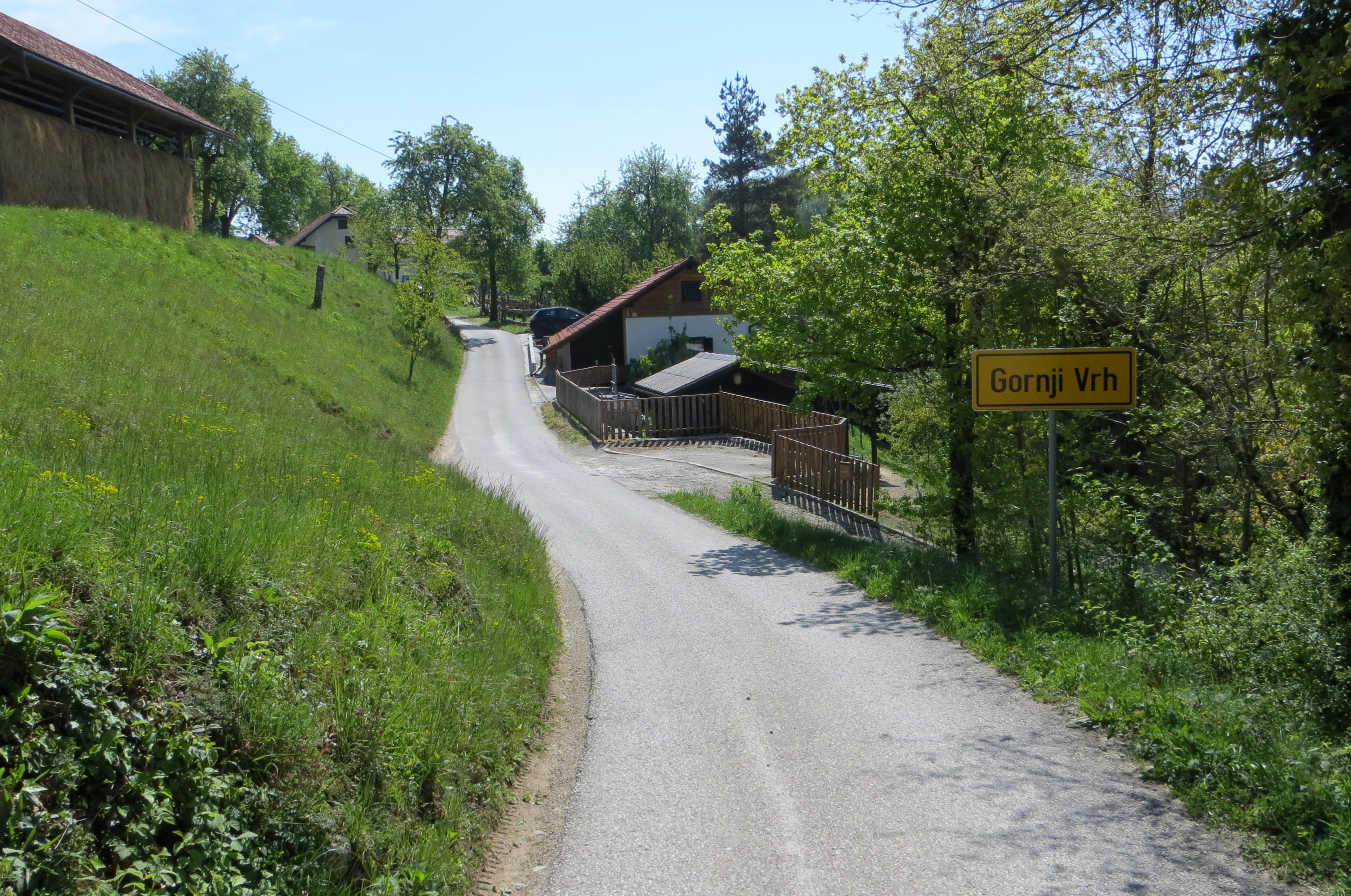

- Location in Slovenia
- Coordinates: 45°58′32.78″N 14°55′48.64″E
- Country: Slovenia
- Traditional region: Lower Carniola
- Statistical region: Central Slovenia
- Municipality: Šmartno pri Litiji

Area
  - Total: 0.54 km^{2} (0.21 sq mi)
- Elevation: 503.1 m (1,651 ft)

Population (2002)
  - Total: 8

Gornji Vrh (pronounced [ˈɡoːɾnji ˈʋəɾx]; in older sources also Gorenji Vrh, German: Oberwerch) is a small dispersed settlement in the Municipality of Šmartno pri Litiji in central Slovenia. The area is part of the historical region of Lower Carniola and is now included in the Central Slovenia Statistical Region.

== History ==
In 2013, the settlement of Razbore – katastrska občina Poljane – del (literally, 'part of Razbore in the cadastral community of Poljane') was annexed by Gornji Vrh. The territory had formerly been part of the neighboring settlement of Razbore in the neighboring Municipality of Trebnje.
