= Gradišče, Šmartno pri Litiji =

Gradišče
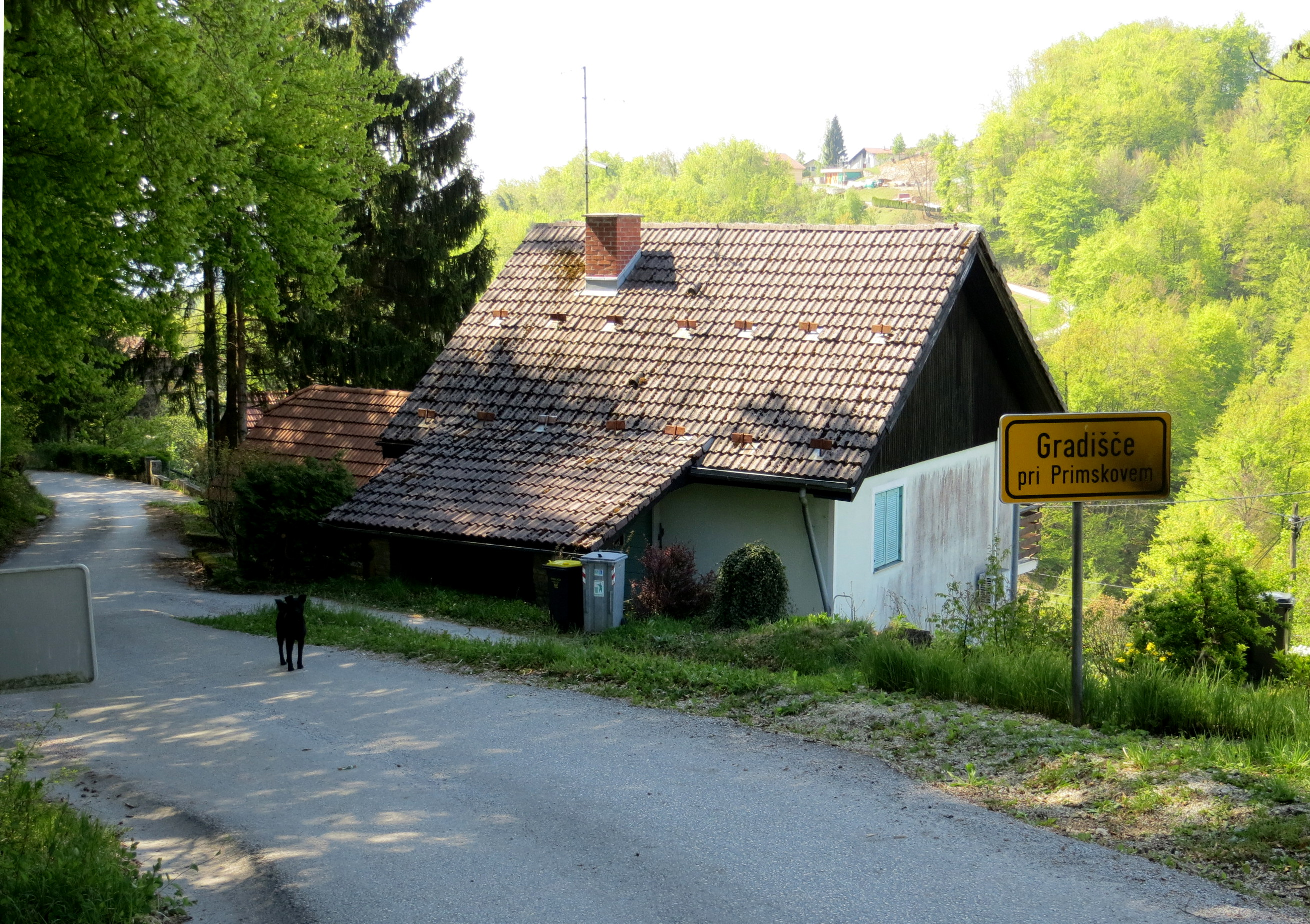

- Location in Slovenia
- Coordinates: 45°48′50.56″N 14°54′49.14″E
- Country: Slovenia
- Traditional region: Lower Carniola
- Statistical region: Central Slovenia
- Municipality: Šmartno pri Litiji

Area
  - Total: 1.51 km^{2} (0.58 sq mi)
- Elevation: 485 m (1,591 ft)

Population (2002)
  - Total: 75

Gradišče (pronounced [ɡɾaˈdiːʃtʃɛ]; German: Gradische), officially Gradišče - K. o. Grad. in Polj. (Gradišče in the Cadastral Districts of Gradišče and Poljane), is a small settlement in the Municipality of Šmartno pri Litiji in central Slovenia. The area is part of the historical region of Lower Carniola. The municipality is now included in the Central Slovenia Statistical Region. It includes the hamlets of Kremenjek and Primskova Gora (German: Primskauberg).

== Church ==
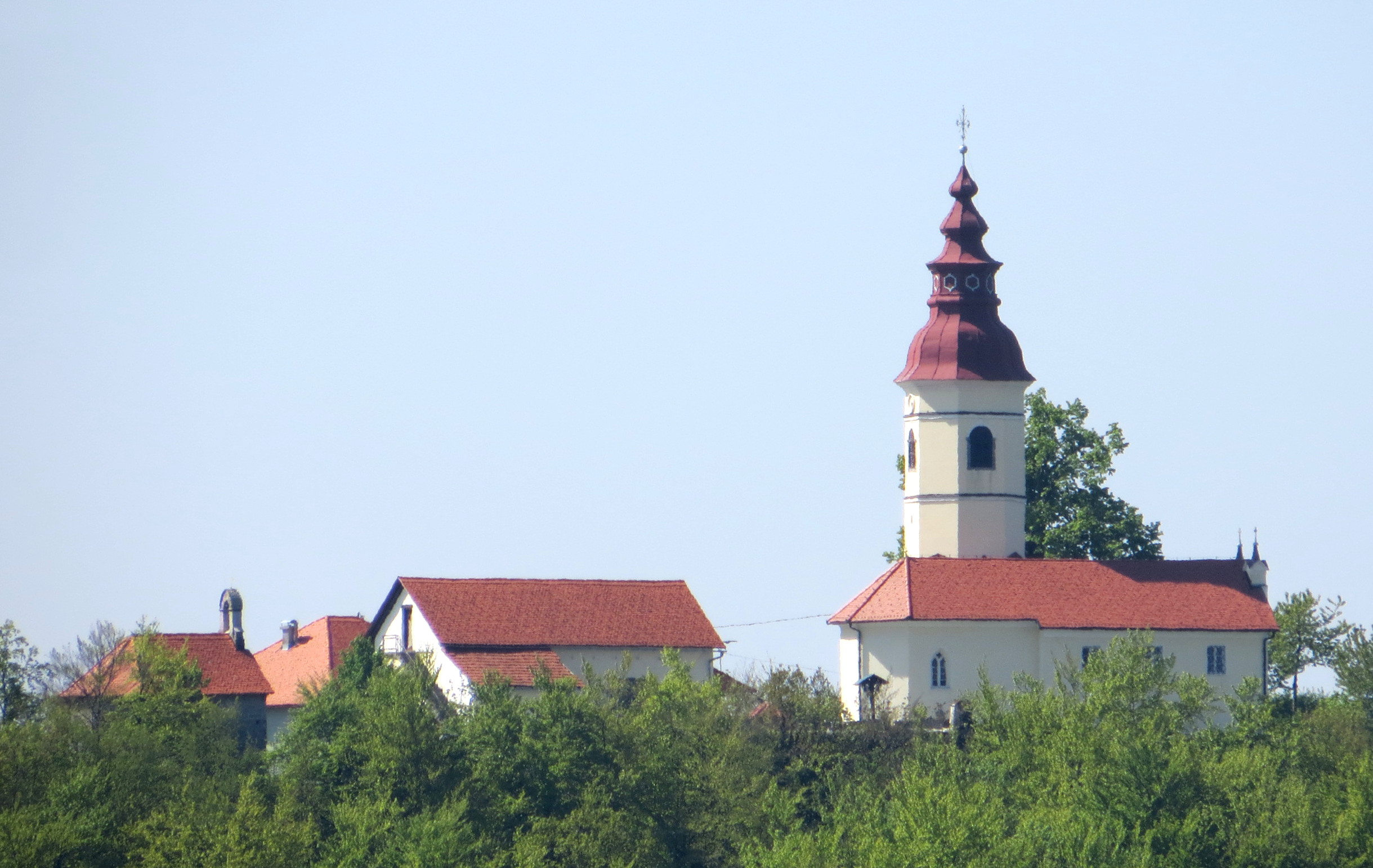
Nativity of Mary Church

The local church is known as the Primskovo parish church; it is built on top of a hill west of the settlement, is dedicated to the Nativity of Mary, and belongs to the Roman Catholic Archdiocese of Ljubljana. It dates to the 16th century.
