= Čatež, Trebnje =

Čatež
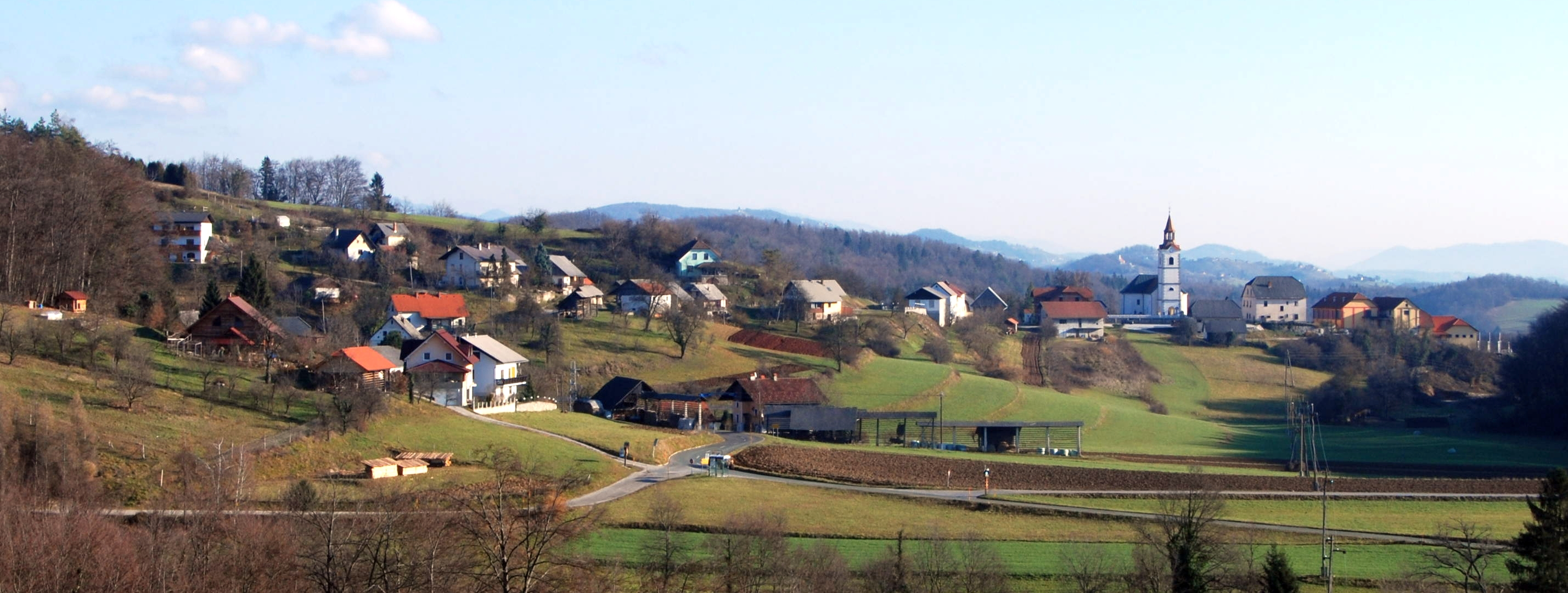
- View of Čatež from Razbore

- Location in Slovenia
- Coordinates: 45°58′12.1″N 14°57′38.29″E
- Country: Slovenia
- Traditional region: Lower Carniola
- Statistical region: Southeast Slovenia
- Municipality: Trebnje

Area
  - Total: 1.24 km^{2} (0.48 sq mi)
- Elevation: 453.9 m (1,489 ft)

Population (2002)
  - Total: 106

Čatež (pronounced [ˈtʃaːtɛʃ]; German: Tschatesch) is a settlement in the Municipality of Trebnje in eastern Slovenia. The area is part of the historical region of Lower Carniola. The municipality is now included in the Southeast Slovenia Statistical Region.

== Name ==
Čatež was attested in written sources circa 1400 as Schryetes (and as Tschretes in 1444). Medieval attestations indicate that the name was originally *Črětež, derived from the archaic common noun *čretež 'clearing, cleared land', referring to the local geography. A less likely theory is that it is derived from the noun čret or čreta 'swamp' because the area is not swampy. Rejected etymologies include derivation from čata 'ambush' because of evidence from the medieval attestations (with čr-) and the limitation of this lexeme to eastern Slovenia, and derivation from the fairy-tale name Čatež for both phonological and typological reasons. In the past the German name was Tschatesch.

== Churches ==
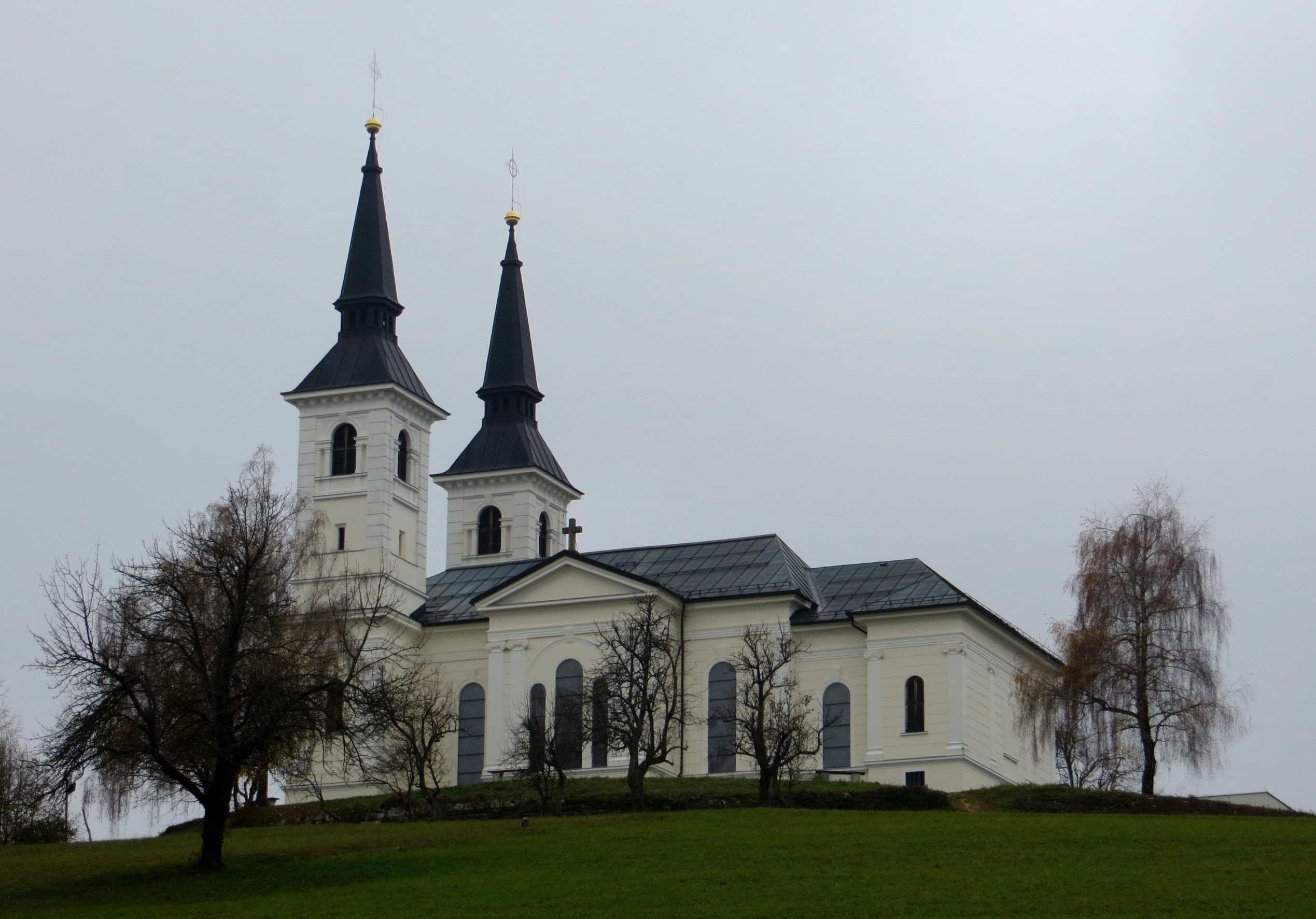
Assumption Church

The local parish church is dedicated to Saint Michael and belongs to the Roman Catholic Diocese of Novo Mesto. It was first mentioned in written documents dating to 1526 and was expanded in the 19th century. The place is also known for its pilgrimage church dedicated to the Assumption of Mary, built in the hamlet of Zaplaz on a hill north of the settlement. It is a Neo-Renaissance building with two spires, built between 1906 and 1926 on the site of an earlier church from 1848.
