= Fu Niu Lele =

Official mascot of the 2008 Summer Paralympics in Beijing

Mascot of the 2008 Summer Paralympics (Beijing)
- Creator: Wu Guanying (吴冠英)

Fu Niu Lele
- Traditional Chinese: 福牛樂樂
- Simplified Chinese: 福牛乐乐
- Literal meaning: lucky cattle happy-happy
Transcriptions
Standard Mandarin
- Hanyu Pinyin: Fú niú lè lè
- IPA: [fǔ njǒʊ lɤ̂.lɤ̂]

Fu Niu Lele (Chinese: 福牛乐乐; lit. 'lucky happy ox'), was the mascot of the 2008 Summer Paralympics in Beijing.

The mascot, designed by Wu Guanying (吴冠英), professor at the Academy of Arts and Design at Tsinghua University, was unveiled on September 6, 2006 at the foot of the Great Wall of China's Badaling.

Fu Niu Lele is a multicolored cow who represents a harmonious co-existence between mankind and nature, he represents athletes with a disability striving to make progress, and he represents the Beijing Paralympics Games' concept of "Transcendence, Equality and Integration."

== History ==
There were originally 87 mascot designs suggestions. These were discussed by a jury on December 30, 2005, and shortlisted to three designs: a Chinese river dolphin (baiji), and two figures from traditional Chinese mythology, the Monkey King and Ne Zha. A revising group, led by Wu Guanying, looked over the three designs, and found that the dolphin and Monkey King designs could cause problems with intellectual property rights, while the Ne Zha was not suitable.

They considered looking for an alternative design, and Wu came up with the idea of a cartoon cow. Wu said "I grew up in the countryside and was once a cow herder, so I know that the cow is one of the animals closest to human beings. Cows are well-known for their friendliness and their affinity to the humans who care for them."

The colours of Fu Niu Lele come from traditional Chinese New Year drawings and toys.

== See also ==
- The Fuwa, mascots of the 2008 Summer Olympics in Beijing
- Sumi and Mukmuk, mascots of the 2010 Winter Paralympics in Vancouver
- Tom, mascot of the 2016 Summer Paralympics in Rio de Janeiro
- Someity, mascot of the 2020 Summer Paralympics in Tokyo
- Shuey Rhon Rhon, mascot of the 2022 Winter Paralympics in Beijing

Preceded by Aster	Paralympic mascot Fu Niu Lele; Beijing 2008	Succeeded by Sumi and Mukmuk
