= List of Paralympic mascots =

Each Paralympic Games have a mascot, often an animal native to the area or occasionally human figures representing the cultural heritage. Nowadays, most of the merchandise aimed at young people focuses on the mascots, rather than the Paralympic flag or organization logos.

Noggi and Joggi, the mascots of the 1980 Summer Paralympics are possibly the first Paralympic mascots. However, since the 1988 Summer Paralympics, all of the Paralympic mascots have been associated with their Olympic counterparts.

== List of mascots ==
Games	City	Name	Type	Designer	Significance	Image	Refs.
1980 Summer Paralympics	(Netherlands) Arnhem	Noggi and Joggi	Red squirrels	Necky Oprinsen	Possibly the first Paralympic mascots when those Games were still called the World Disabled Games.		
1984 Summer Paralympics	(United States) Long Island; (United Kingdom) Stoke Mandeville	Dan D. Lion	Lion	Maryanne McGrath Higgins	The name was chosen following a vote by students at a school for students with severe physical impairments.		
1988 Summer Paralympics	(South Korea) Seoul	Gomdoori	Asian black bears	Lee Yun Soo	The Gomdoori (Korean for "teddy bears") were the Paralympic mascots for Seoul 1988. The bears are tied together to symbolize cooperation. Gomdoori originally used as the mascot of the 1986 Asian Games.		
1992 Winter Paralympics	(France) Albertville	Alpy	The peak of Grande Motte	Vincent Thiebaut	Represented the summit of the Grande Motte mountain in Tignes. Colors were white, green and blue, to represent nature and the lake.		
1992 Summer Paralympics	(Spain) Barcelona	Petra	Armless girl	Javier Mariscal	Depicted as an honest, diplomatic, energetic, impatient and brave girl. As the first Paralympic mascot with disability, the design was based as friend of Mariscal, the Chilean-German artist Lorenza Böttner, like her, she has no arms, which symbolizes that she does not possess any weapons, and represents peace and harmony.		
1994 Winter Paralympics	(Norway) Lillehammer	Sondre	Troll	Tor Lindrupsen and Janne Solem	The name was chosen in a competition and derives from the great skiing pioneer Sondre Nordheim.		
1996 Summer Paralympics	(United States) Atlanta	Blaze	Phoenix	Trevor Irvin	The phoenix is the symbol of the city of Atlanta.		
1998 Winter Paralympics	(Japan) Nagano	Parabbit	Rabbit	Sadahiko Kojima	A competition was held among students to find a name for the 1998 Winter Paralympic mascot, and the designation "Parabbit" was chosen from among 3,408 different entries.		
2000 Summer Paralympics	(Australia) Sydney	Lizzie	Frilled lizard	Matthew Hattan and Jozef Szekeres	Her frill was shaped like the combined map of Australia and Tasmania		
2002 Winter Paralympics	(United States) Salt Lake City	Otto	Sea otter	Steve Small, Landor Associates and Publicis	The otter was chosen because of its quickness and liveliness.		
2004 Summer Paralympics	(Greece) Athens	Proteas	Seahorse	Spyros Gogos	Named after the mythologic sea-god or god of rivers and oceanic bodies of water, Proteus. From the myth also comes their name, as a feature of Proteus comes the adjective protean, with the general meaning of "versatile", "mutable", "capable of assuming many forms". "Protean" has positive connotations of flexibility, versatility and adaptability.		
2006 Winter Paralympics	(Italy) Turin	Aster	Snowflake	Pedro Albuquerque	Aster the snowflake represents the uniqueness of each participating athlete.		
2008 Summer Paralympics	(China) Beijing	Fu Niu Lele	Cow	Wu GuanYing	Represents a harmonious co-existence between mankind and nature, it represents athletes with a disability striving to make progress, and it represents the Beijing 2008 Paralympic Summer Games' concept of "Transcendence, Equality and Integration."		
2010 Winter Paralympics	(Canada) Vancouver	Sumi	Hybrid mythical creature	Meomi Design (a group of Vicki Wong and Michael Murphy)	With wings of a Thunderbird, legs of an American black bear, and a hat of a killer whale in an artistic style of Haida people, he pays homage to Canadian legends.		
2010 Winter Paralympics	(Canada) Vancouver	Mukmuk	Vancouver Island marmot	Meomi Design (a group of Vicki Wong and Michael Murphy)	Not an official mascot, but the designated "sidekick".		
2012 Summer Paralympics	(United Kingdom) London	Mandeville	One-eyed drop of steel	Iris	Named after the birthplace of the Paralympic Games, Stoke Mandeville Hospital in Buckinghamshire.	Globe Mandeville	
2014 Winter Paralympics	(Russia) Sochi	Luchik and Snezhinka	A ray of light and a snowflake	Natalia Balashova and Anna Zhilinsky	Luhik came from a different planet that was perpetually hot, while Snezhinka hailed from a planet that was perpetually cold.		
2016 Summer Paralympics	(Brazil) Rio de Janeiro	Tom	A hybrid plant made of all Brazilian plants	Luciana Eguti and Paulo Muppet	Inspired by the diversity of the Brazilian flora. Named after the local musician Tom Jobim decided by popular vote.		
2018 Winter Paralympics	(South Korea) Pyeongchang	Bandabi	Asiatic black bear	MASS C&G	Its name is also formed from two Korean words: bandal (반달) and bi (비), meaning "half-moon" to refer to the white crescent on an Asiatic black bear's chest and the latter connoting commemoration to celebrate the games.		
2020 Summer Paralympics	(Japan) Tokyo	Someity	Robot	Ryo Taniguchi	The Paralympic mascot was chosen from several designs submitted by schoolchildren and illustrators throughout Japan.		
2022 Winter Paralympics	(China) Beijing	Shuey Rhon Rhon	Chinese lantern	Jiang Yufan	Designed with Chinese New Year lanterns as the prototype.As the games were held during the Chinese New Year, the Lanterns represent harvest, celebration, warmth and light. The wishful shape at the top symbolizes auspicious happiness; the continuous pattern of the dove of peace and the Temple of Heaven symbolizes the peaceful friendship and highlights the characteristics of the place where the place is held; the decorative pattern incorporates the traditional Chinese paper-cut art; the snow on the face represents the meaning of "a fall of seasonable snow gives promise of a fruitful year". It also reflects the anthropomorphic design and highlights the mascot's cuteness.		
2024 Summer Paralympics	(France) Paris	Paralympic Phryge	Phrygian Cap	Gilles Deleris	An anthropomorphic Phrygian Cap based on the one Marianne wore at the time of the French Revolution. Also the first Paralympic mascot since the 1994 Winter Paralympics with an obvious disability with a prosthetic right leg. Revealed on 14 November 2022		
2026 Winter Paralympics	(Italy) Milan-Cortina d'Ampezzo	Milo	Stoat	Students of the Istituto Comprensivo of Taverna in Calabria	Milo's name is derived from Milan, one of the two host cities. Milo is missing a leg, and uses his tail in its place.		
2028 Summer Paralympics	(United States) Los Angeles	TBA	TBA	TBA	to be revealed in 2026		

== See also ==
- List of mascots
- Paralympic symbols
- Olympic mascots
- Olympic symbols
