= Fuwa =

Official mascots of the 2008 Summer Olympics in Beijing

- Chinese: 福娃
- Literal meaning: dolls of blessing
Transcriptions
Standard Mandarin
- Hanyu Pinyin: Fúwá
Yue: Cantonese
- Jyutping: fuk1 waa1

From left to right: Beibei, Jingjing, Huanhuan, Yingying and Nini

The Fuwa (Chinese: 福娃; pinyin: Fúwá; literally "good-luck dolls", also known as "Friendlies") were the mascots of the 2008 Summer Olympics in Beijing. The designs were created by Han Meilin, a Chinese artist. The designs were publicly announced by the National Society of Chinese Classic Literature Studies on 11 November 2005 at an event marking the 1000th day before the opening of the games.

There are five Fuwas: Beibei, Jingjing, Huanhuan, Yingying and Nini. Together, the names form the sentence "北京欢迎你", or "Beijing huanying ni," which means "Beijing welcomes you". Originally named 'The Friendlies', they were promoted as 'Fuwa' when concerns arose that the name could be misinterpreted.

While originally given artistic licence in his commission, Han Meilin was subsequently requested by officials to include various Chinese designs and fauna in the Fuwa. Han Meilin drew 1,000 models of possible Fuwa (including a dragon and an anthropomorphic drum) before settling on the five characters. He has since disowned the Fuwa and did not include them in his museum. He suffered two heart attacks while designing the Fuwa.

A 100-episode Olympic-themed animated television series featuring the Fuwa was released in China, primarily on BTV (Beijing's municipal television network), on 8 August 2007. Titled The Olympic Adventures of Fuwa (Chinese: 福娃奥运漫游记; pinyin: Fúwá Àoyùn Mànyóujì), it was jointly produced by BTV and Kaku Cartoon. It ran from 8 August to 1 October 2007. There are also two sequels created by CCTV, Beibei's Promise and The Five Rings.

The China Environmental Awareness Programme, started in 2001, used the Fuwa to raise public awareness by spreading environmental messages.

== Mascots ==
=== Beibei ===
Beibei (Chinese: 贝贝) is one of the two female Fuwa who represents the blue Olympic ring of Europe.

She took her motif from traditional Chinese New Year decorative picture of lotus and fish and the fish design from Neolithic artifacts. Her element motif are the sea and water. She is a friendly leader (though the title of leader belongs to Huanhuan) who brings prosperity.

In traditional Chinese culture, the fish represents prosperity, as the character for fish (鱼 / 魚; yú) sounds the same as that for surplus (余 / 餘; yú). The "carp leaping over the dragon gate" is a traditional allegory of following one's dreams and achieving them. The pattern from Beibei's headgear comes from artifacts unearthed at Banpo, site of a Neolithic village of the Yangshao culture.

She is an expert at aquatic sports.

=== Jingjing ===
Jingjing (Chinese: 晶晶) is one of the three male Fuwa who represents the black Olympic ring of Africa.

Jingjing's design is based on the giant panda and the Song dynasty lotus-shaped porcelain, representing the natural elements/motifs of forest and wood. Within the Fuwa group, he is characterized as optimistic and honest while always symbolizing the spread of happiness.

As an endangered species, the panda is both a national symbol of China and an international symbol of environmentalism. Jingjing's forest origins also symbolize the harmonious coexistence of humankind and nature.

He is an expert at weightlifting, judo, etc.

=== Huanhuan ===
Huanhuan (Chinese: 欢欢) is one of the three male Fuwa who represents the red Olympic ring of the Americas.

He took his motif from the Olympic flame and the fire design from the Mogao Grottoes. As such, his elemental motif is fire.

He represents the passion of sports, the Olympic spirit of "faster, higher, stronger", and the passion of the Beijing Olympics. Huanhuan's headgear comes from a fire design in the Mogao Caves, the best known of the Chinese Buddhist grottoes.

He is an expert at ball sports/racquet sports.

=== Yingying ===
Yingying (Chinese: 迎迎) is one of the three male Fuwa who represents the yellow Olympic ring of Asia.

He took his motif from the Tibetan antelope and Tibetan and Xinjiang ethnic costumes. His elemental motif is earth. He is a lively and independent Fuwa who had an interest in health.

The Tibetan antelope is an endangered species native to the Tibetan Plateau, known for its swiftness. Yingying's headgear incorporates elements of Tibetan and Xinjiang ethnic costumes.

He is an expert at track and field.

=== Nini ===
Nini (Chinese: 妮妮) is one of the two female Fuwa who represents the green Olympic ring of Oceania.

She took her motif from the swift bird and Beijing's sand martin kite. Her elemental motifs are sky and metal. She is characterized by her justice and kindness; she also spreads good fortune.

The swallow is a messenger of spring and happiness in Chinese culture, and is seen as a symbol of good fortune. The Chinese character for swallow (燕 yàn) is also used in Yanjing (燕京), an old name for Beijing; thus the swallow alludes to Beijing. Nini's headgear uses the design of Beijing's sand martin kites, which are colourful cross-shaped kites modeled after swallows.

She is an expert at gymnastics.

== Reception ==
In the months leading up to the Olympics, Internet users blamed the Fuwa for natural disasters such as floods and earthquakes. The superstition was known as the "Curse of the Fuwa".

== Parodies ==
Groups seeking to raise political issues in tandem with China's hosting of the Olympic Games used the Fuwa or have created similar mascots.

- Nu Wa, a monkey with a red bandana, was created by Amnesty International. Nu Wa means "angry young boy".
- Play Fair 2008, a campaign organised by the Clean Clothes Campaign (CCC), the International Trade Union Confederation (ITUC), and the International Textile, Garment and Leather Workers' Federation (ITGLWF) to raise awareness for the rights of workers involved in the sporting goods industries, have used the Fuwa.
- Gengen Genocide, a brown and yellow character wearing a gun and a fuel pump nozzle head-dress that forms a skull and crossbones, was developed by a group seeking to raise attention to the People's Republic of China's involvement in Darfur. Gengen's name is derived from the term genocide.

In addition, Beijing residents have allegedly created their own Fuwa set consisting of a duck, a dragonfly and a taxi. Collectively their names—"Ya", "Ting", "De"—spell out "bastard" in Beijing slang.

== See also ==
- Fu Niu Lele
- Lele
- Bing Dwen Dwen
- Shuey Rhon Rhon

Preceded by Neve and Gliz	Olympic mascot The Fuwa; Beijing 2008	Succeeded by Miga, Quatchi and Mukmuk
