= Sukki, Nokki, Lekki and Tsukki =

Official mascots of the 1998 Winter Olympics in Nagano

The Snowlets
- Sukki, Nokki, Lekki and Tsukki

Mascots of the 1998 Winter Olympics (Nagano)
- Creator: Landor Associates
- Significance: Fire (Sukki), air (Nokki), earth (Lekki) and water (Tsukki)

Sukki, Nokki, Lekki and Tsukki, also known as the Snowlets, are the mascots of the 1998 Winter Olympics in Nagano and are four colorful snowy owls. They represent respectively fire (Sukki), air (Nokki), earth (Lekki) and water (Tsukki), and together they represent the four major islands of Japan. The choice of four mascots is a nod to the four years that make up an Olympiad. In addition, the first two letters of the four names form the word "snowlets". "Snow" recalls the winter season, during which the Games take place, and "lets" refers to "let's", an invitation to join in the Games celebrations. "Owlets" means young owls. The four Snowlets' names were chosen from among 47,484 suggestions. The mascots are a creation of Landor Associates. The agency responsible for creating the mascots was the same one that designed the torch for the Atlanta Games in 1996, and also took part in designing the mascots for Salt Lake City 2002.

Owls are venerated around the world as having the "wisdom of the woods"; in Greek mythology, the owl is associated with Athena, the goddess of wisdom.

Originally, the mascot for the 1998 Winter Olympics was going to be a weasel called Snowple.

== See also ==
- Miraitowa and Someity – Mascots of the 2020 Summer Olympics and Paralympics

== Notes ==
Preceded by Izzy	Olympic mascot The Snowlets; Nagano 1998	Succeeded by Olly, Syd and Millie
