= Olly, Syd, Millie and Lizzie =

Official mascots of the 2000 Summer Olympics and Paralympics in Sydney

Olly, Syd and Millie

Mascots of the 2000 Summer Olympics (Sydney)
- Creator: Matthew Hattan and Jozef Szekeres
- Significance: A kookaburra (Olly), a platypus (Syd) and an echidna (Millie) named after the short term for Olympics, Sydney and Millennium

Lizzie

Mascot of the 2000 Summer Paralympics (Sydney)
- Creator: Matthew Hattan and Jozef Szekeres
- Significance: A Frill-necked Lizard

Olly, Syd and Millie were the official mascots of the 2000 Summer Olympics, and Lizzie was the official mascot of the 2000 Summer Paralympics, both held in Sydney, Australia.

Olly, Syd and Millie were named by Philip Sheldon from advertising agency DMBB. Olly (from Olympics) the kookaburra represents air and the Olympic spirit of generosity. Syd (from Sydney) the platypus represents water, the environment, and the energy of Australia and its population. Millie (from Millennium) the echidna represents technology and the earth.

The mascot for the 2000 Paralympics was Lizzie the frill-necked lizard, a native Australian lizard which inhabits northern parts of the country. The shape of the character's frill represented the geographical shape of the country, and the ochre colour of Lizzie's body aimed to mirror the colour of the land. The animal was chosen because of its survival instincts and tenacity, and was intended to represent the character traits of Paralympic athletes. The mascots were designed by Matthew Hattan and Jozef Szekeres. and Lizzie’s name was chosen by students’ votes.

Lizzie's voice was provided by Olivia Newton-John, who made appearances alongside Lizzie leading up and during the Games.

The visibility of and community engagement with Lizzie outpaced that of the other three Olympic mascots. The Australian Paralympic Committees noted the significant branding capital and realised that this could be leveraged in the future.

In 2021, Lizzie made a return as a part of the Royal Australian Mint's "Aussie Heroes" $2 coin collection and, later, a sticker pack promoted in Woolworths made for the 2020 Summer Olympics.

== See also ==
- Fatso the Fat-Arsed Wombat, an unofficial mascot of the 2000 Games.
- List of Australian sporting mascots
- List of Olympic mascots
- List of Paralympic mascots

Preceded by The Snowlets; Nagano 1998	Olympic mascot Olly, Syd and Millie; Sydney 2000	Succeeded by Powder, Copper and Coal; Salt Lake City 2002
Preceded by Parabbit; Nagano 1998	Paralympic mascot Lizzie; Sydney 2000	Succeeded by Otto; Salt Lake City 2002
