= List of Olympic mascots =

The Olympic mascots are fictional characters who represent the cultural heritage of the location where the Olympic Games are taking place. They are often an animal native to the area or human figures.

One of the first Olympic mascots was created for the 1968 Winter Olympics in Grenoble; a stylized cartoon character on skis named Schuss. The first official Olympic mascot appeared in the 1972 Summer Olympics in Munich, and was a rainbow-colored Dachshund dog named Waldi.

Since the 2010 Winter Olympics in Vancouver, the Olympic and Paralympic mascots have always been presented together, which was first done in the 1992 Summer Olympics in Barcelona. The Youth Olympic Games, which are run by the International Olympic Committee, have had mascots as well.

== Olympic mascots ==
Games	City	Name	Type	Designer	Significance	Image	Refs.
1932 Summer Olympics	(United States) Los Angeles	Smoky	Dog	—N/a	The only Olympic mascot to be a real live animal. (unofficial)		
1964 Summer Olympics	(Japan) Tokyo	Kapa	Kappa	Unknown	A creature from Japanese mythology. (unofficial)		
1968 Winter Olympics	(France) Grenoble	Schuss	Skier	Aline Lafargue	An abstract figure with the colors of the flag of France. The name derives from the term schussboom, referring to a straight downhill run at high speeds. (unofficial)		
1968 Summer Olympics	Mexico City	Chac Mool	Jaguar	Unknown	A pink chacmool jaguar. (unofficial)		
1972 Winter Olympics	(Japan) Sapporo	Takuchan	Asian black bear	Seiko design department	Designed and marketed by sponsors of the Games. (unofficial)		
1972 Summer Olympics	(Germany) Munich	Waldi	Dachshund dog	Elena Winschermann	A popular breed in Bavaria, it represented the attributes required for athletes – resistance, tenacity and agility.		
1976 Winter Olympics	(Austria) Innsbruck	Schneemann and Sonnenweiberl	Snowman and Sun woman	Walter Pötsch	Schneemann is named after the German word for snowman and wears a red Tyrolean hat, a traditional hat from the Alps.		
1976 Summer Olympics	(Canada) Montreal	Amik	Beaver	Yvon Laroche, Pierre-Yves Pelletier, Guy St-Arnaud and George Huel	Beavers are one of the national symbols of Canada.		
1980 Winter Olympics	(United States) Lake Placid	Roni	Raccoon	Donald Moss	Its face design resembles the hat and goggles used by competitors. It was named for the Adirondack mountain range. The 1980 Winter Olympics initially had a live racoon named Rocky as the mascot, but it died, leading to the creation of Roni.		
1980 Summer Olympics	(Soviet Union) Moscow	Misha (Миша)	Brown bear	Victor Chizhikov	The Russian Bear was the national symbol of the Soviet Union.		
1984 Winter Olympics	(Socialist Federal Republic of Yugoslavia) Sarajevo	Vučko	Wolf	Jože Trobec	Wolves are prominent in Yugoslavian fables and common in the Dinaric Alps. The mascot was designed with a cute face to dissociate him from the ferocity of real wolves.		
1984 Summer Olympics	(United States) Los Angeles	Sam	Bald eagle	Robert Moore (from The Walt Disney Company)	The national bird of the United States.		
1988 Winter Olympics	(Canada) Calgary	Hidy and Howdy	Polar bears	Sheila Scott	Both represent Western Canadian hospitality.		
1988 Summer Olympics	(South Korea) Seoul	Hodori (호돌이)	Siberian tiger	Hyun Kim	Siberian tigers are common in Korean legends. Hodori was originally used as the mascot of the 1986 Asian Games.		
1992 Winter Olympics	(France) Albertville	Magique	Man-star/snow imp	Philippe Mairesse	The colors of the mascot are based on those of the French flag. Magique replaced the original mascot of the 1992 games, a mountain goat, two years before the games began.		
1992 Summer Olympics	(Spain) Barcelona	Cobi	Catalan sheepdog	Javier Mariscal	Drawn in avant-garde, cubist style		
1994 Winter Olympics	(Norway) Lillehammer	Håkon and Kristin	Humans	Kari and Werner Grossman	Both are dressed in Viking clothes. They were the first Olympic mascots to be human figures. They were named after Hakon Hakonson and Kristin Sverrisdottir.		
1996 Summer Olympics	(United States) Atlanta	Izzy	Alien	John Ryan	The first computer-generated mascot.		
1998 Winter Olympics	(Japan) Nagano	The Snowlets: Sukki, Nokki, Lekki and Tsukki	Owls	Pierre-Laurent Thève/Landor Associates, Paris	The four owls represented fire, earth, air, and water. They replaced the original mascot of the games, which was a weasel named Snowple.		
2000 Summer Olympics	(Australia) Sydney	Olly (from "Olympic")	Kookaburra	Jozef Szekeres, Matthew Hatton	Representing the Olympic spirit of generosity.		
2000 Summer Olympics	(Australia) Sydney	Syd (from "Sydney")	Platypus	Jozef Szekeres, Matthew Hatton	Representing the environment and energy of the people of Australia.		
2000 Summer Olympics	(Australia) Sydney	Millie (from "Millennium")	Echidna	Jozef Szekeres, Matthew Hatton	Representing the Millennium. All three mascots are common wild animals found in Australia.		
2000 Summer Olympics	(Australia) Sydney	Fatso the Fat-Arsed Wombat	Wombat	Roy and HG, Paul Newell	A wombat that proved more popular than the official mascots. (unofficial)		
2002 Winter Olympics	(United States) Salt Lake City	Powder (a.k.a. Swifter)	Snowshoe hare	Steve Small, Landor Associates and Publicis	All three mascots are indigenous animals of the U.S. state of Utah, and are named after natural resources important to the state's economy. These animals are major characters in the legends of local Native Americans in the United States, and these legends are reflected in the story of each mascot. To remind them of this heritage, all mascots wear a charm around their neck with a petroglyph image.		
2002 Winter Olympics	(United States) Salt Lake City	Copper (a.k.a. Higher)	Coyote	Steve Small, Landor Associates and Publicis	All three mascots are indigenous animals of the U.S. state of Utah, and are named after natural resources important to the state's economy. These animals are major characters in the legends of local Native Americans in the United States, and these legends are reflected in the story of each mascot. To remind them of this heritage, all mascots wear a charm around their neck with a petroglyph image.		
2002 Winter Olympics	(United States) Salt Lake City	Coal (a.k.a. Stronger)	American black bear	Steve Small, Landor Associates and Publicis	All three mascots are indigenous animals of the U.S. state of Utah, and are named after natural resources important to the state's economy. These animals are major characters in the legends of local Native Americans in the United States, and these legends are reflected in the story of each mascot. To remind them of this heritage, all mascots wear a charm around their neck with a petroglyph image.		
2004 Summer Olympics	(Greece) Athens	Athena and Phevos (Αθηνά και Φοίβος)	Daidala	Spyros Gogos	Two modern children resembling ancient Greek daidala sculptures.		
2006 Winter Olympics	(Italy) Turin	Neve and Gliz	Snowball and Ice cube	Pedro Albuquerque	Their names mean "Snow" and "Ice". The designs were chosen in an international contest, which was won by Portuguese artist Pedro Albuquerque.		
2008 Summer Olympics	(China) Beijing	Beibei	Koi	Han Meilin	The five names form the Chinese phrase "Beijing huan ying ni" (北京欢迎你), which means "Beijing welcomes you". Each representing an Olympic ring and Feng Shui element.		
2008 Summer Olympics	(China) Beijing	Jingjing	Giant panda	Han Meilin	The five names form the Chinese phrase "Beijing huan ying ni" (北京欢迎你), which means "Beijing welcomes you". Each representing an Olympic ring and Feng Shui element.		
2008 Summer Olympics	(China) Beijing	Huanhuan	Olympic Flame	Han Meilin	The five names form the Chinese phrase "Beijing huan ying ni" (北京欢迎你), which means "Beijing welcomes you". Each representing an Olympic ring and Feng Shui element.		
2008 Summer Olympics	(China) Beijing	Yingying	Tibetan antelope	Han Meilin	The five names form the Chinese phrase "Beijing huan ying ni" (北京欢迎你), which means "Beijing welcomes you". Each representing an Olympic ring and Feng Shui element.		
2008 Summer Olympics	(China) Beijing	Nini	Swallow	Han Meilin	The five names form the Chinese phrase "Beijing huan ying ni" (北京欢迎你), which means "Beijing welcomes you". Each representing an Olympic ring and Feng Shui element.		
2010 Winter Olympics	(Canada) Vancouver	Miga	Sea Bear	Meomi Design	Part orca and part kermode bear		
2010 Winter Olympics	(Canada) Vancouver	Quatchi	Sasquatch	Meomi Design	From Canadian mythology		
2010 Winter Olympics	(Canada) Vancouver	Mukmuk	Vancouver Island marmot	Meomi Design	Not an official mascot, but their designated "sidekick".		
2012 Summer Olympics	(United Kingdom) London	Wenlock	A drop of steel with a camera for an eye.	Iris	Named after the village of Much Wenlock in Shropshire, which hosted the Wenlock Olympian Games, a precursor to the modern Olympic Games in the 19th century. It represents the UK's start of the Industrial Revolution.		
2014 Winter Olympics	(Russia) Sochi	Leopard, Zaika and Bely Mishka (Леопард, Зайка, Белый Мишка)	Hare, Snow Leopard and Polar Bear	Silvia Petrova, Vadim Pak, Oleg Serdechny	The first Olympic mascots decided by popular vote.		
2014 Winter Olympics	(Russia) Sochi	Zoich (Зойч)	A furry blue frog with strange eyes	Yegor Zhgun	A popular character commissioned by the Sochi 2014 Organizing Committee to promote the mascot poll and serve as a fake protest vote. (unofficial)		
2016 Summer Olympics	(Brazil) Rio de Janeiro	Vinicius	A hybrid animal representing all Brazilian mammals	Luciana Eguti and Paulo Muppet	Inspired by Brazilian fauna. Named after the poet and bossa nova composer Vinicius de Moraes, decided by popular vote.		
2018 Winter Olympics	(South Korea) Pyeongchang	Soohorang (수호랑)	A white tiger	MASS C&G	The tiger is an animal closely related to Korean mythology, and is a symbol of trust, strength, and protection. The name combines "Sooho", a word for protection, and "Rang", which is a mix of the Korean word for tiger and the name of a folk song in the Gangwon Province.		
2020 Summer Olympics	(Japan) Tokyo	Miraitowa (ミライトワ)	Robot	Ryo Taniguchi	A superhero-inspired robot that embodies both old tradition and new innovation. The Olympic mascot was chosen from several designs submitted by schoolchildren and illustrators throughout Japan.		
2022 Winter Olympics	(China) Beijing	Bing Dwen Dwen (冰墩墩)	Giant panda	Cao Xue	A giant panda, a culturally significant animal in China, encased in a suit of ice, with a rainbow ring around the face.		
2024 Summer Olympics	(France) Paris	Olympic Phryge	Phrygian cap	Gilles Deleris	Based on the Phrygian cap, a symbol of the French Revolution.		
2026 Winter Olympics	(Italy) Milan–Cortina d'Ampezzo	Tina	Stoat	Students of the Istituto Comprensivo of Taverna in Calabria	Tina's name is derived from Cortina d'Ampezzo, one of the two host cities.		

== Youth Olympic mascots ==
Games	City	Name	Type	Designer	Significance	Image	Refs.
2010 Summer Youth Olympics	Singapore	Lyo and Merly	Red male lion (Lyo), Blue female merlion (Merly)	Cubix International	The two characters are an allusion to the "Lion City" label of Singapore, and the Merlion, a national symbol of Singapore, respectively.		
2012 Winter Youth Olympics	Innsbruck	Yoggl	Alpine Chamois	Florencia Demaría and Luis Andrés Abbiati of Argentina	Yoggl represents the character of the host city of these games		
2014 Summer Youth Olympics	Nanjing	Lele(砳砳)	Yuhua Stone	Cui Xinye	LeLe is inspired by a unique natural feature of the host city known as the "Rain-Flower Pebble" (also translated as "Riverstone"). The design of the mascot takes the typical shape and appearance of this stone but in a creative and artistic way, highlighting the colours from the emblem's palette. The word 'lele' represents the sound of stones colliding together and is pronounced like the Chinese word meaning happiness or joy.		
2016 Winter Youth Olympics	Lillehammer	Sjogg	Lynx	Line Ansethmoen	The name "Sjogg" translates to "Snow" in the Gudbrandsdalsmål dialects		
2018 Summer Youth Olympics	Buenos Aires	Pandi	Jaguar	Human Full Agency	Pandi's name is a combination of the scientific name of the jaguar (Panthera onca) and the relationship of the mascot with the "digital world".		
2020 Winter Youth Olympics	Lausanne	Yodli	A cow, Saint Bernard dog and a goat hybrid.	ERACOM	Yodli is a cross between a cow, goat, and the Saint Bernard breed of dog, all of which are commonly found in the Swiss mountains. It was named after yodeling.		
2024 Winter Youth Olympics	Gangwon Province	Moongcho	Snowball	Soo-Yeon Park	The character was conceived as a snowball created in a snowball fight between Soohorang and Bandabi.		
2026 Summer Youth Olympics	Dakar	Ayo	Lion	Ndeye Mariama Diop	A young lion wearing a tingandé, a traditional hat worn by the Fula people. His name means "joy" in Yoruba.		

== See also ==
- List of mascots
- Olympic symbols
- Paralympic mascots
- Paralympic symbols
