= Waldi =

Official mascot of the 1972 Summer Olympics in Munich

Mascot of the 1972 Summer Olympics (Munich)
- Creator: Otl Aicher
- Significance: A dachshund

Waldi (German pronunciation: [ˈval.diː]) was the first official Olympic mascot, created for the 1972 Summer Olympics in Munich. He was a dachshund, a popular breed of dog from Germany. The course of the marathon was designed to incorporate the Waldi design, and during the construction phase of the 1972 Olympic stadium and village, Waldi was used in unofficial satirical posters.

== Origin ==
Waldi was created by German designer Otl Aicher, who amongst others was also responsible for designing the logo for German airline Lufthansa. The Dachshund was the first official Olympic mascot, as the 1968 Winter Olympics was the first to use an unofficial mascot, which was a red ball on skis named "Schuss". Waldi was designed to represent the attributes described as required for athletes — resistance, tenacity and agility. Prior to Waldi, an earlier potential mascot named Lumpi was created. Lumpi was also a dachshund.

Waldi was based on a real long-haired Dachshund named Cherie von Birkenhof, which Aicher used as a model. Although Waldi appeared in a variety of different color schemes, it is occasionally reported that the main scheme was designed to match the colors of the Olympic rings, ergo, blue, yellow, orange and green. However, there was no black or red in the main scheme, which was a conscious decision on the part of Aicher to exclude those colors related to the National Socialist Party. The 1972 games were designed to be an optimistic "Rainbow Games".

== Merchandise ==
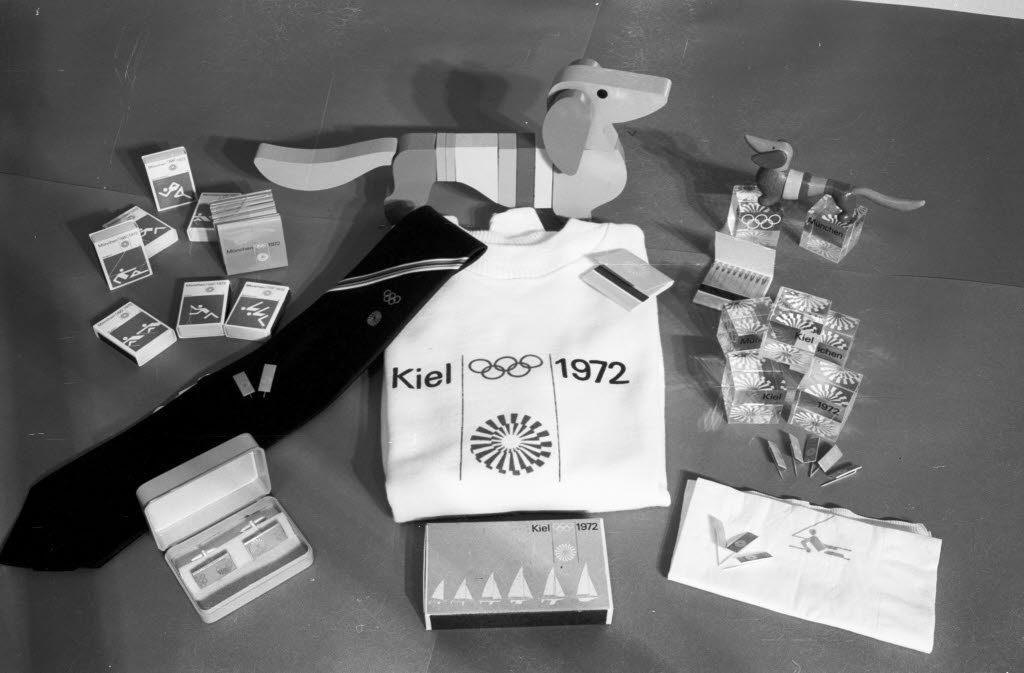
Merchandise from the 1972 Summer Olympics

Fifty licences were granted to manufacturers, at a minimum licensing fee of 245,000 Deutschmarks, and over two million Waldi related items were sold around the world. Waldi was available as a plush toy, a plastic toy, and appeared on buttons, posters and stickers, and as a pin. However, the pin bearing Waldi didn't come out until several years after the Olympics.

== 1972 Olympic Marathon ==
The marathon route in the 1972 Olympics was created to resemble Waldi. The course was arranged so that the head of the dog faced west, with athletes running counter-clockwise, starting at the back of the dog's neck and continuing around the ears. The mouth of the dog was represented by the path through the Nymphenburg Park, and its front feet were represented by the run through the Hirschgarten. The belly was the main downtown street in Munich, and its rear feet, rear end and tail were all in the English Garden, a parkland extending along the Isar River. The athletes continued along the back of the dog and entered the Olympic Stadium.

== Legacy ==
During construction, the bill for the 1972 Olympics increased from the original estimate of $3.5 million to $63 million on the roof of the Olympic Stadium alone. The overall bill of $750 million, which was more than three times the amount Mexico spent on the 1968 games, resulted in unofficial posters of Waldi using the Olympic Tower as a Fire Hydrant.

To coincide with the Phaidon Press publication of the first monograph of Otl Aicher's work, an exhibition of his work on the 1972 Olympics was shown in London in 2007, including his work involving Waldi.

Preceded by Schuss; Grenoble 1968	Olympic mascot Waldi; Munich 1972	Succeeded by Schneemann and Sonnenweiberl; Innsbruck 1976
