= List of people on coins of Canada =

This is a list of notables on coins of Canada. Members of the Monarchy of Canada are not included.

== A ==
Name	Year	Denomination	Special Notes
Anne of Green Gables	2008	25 cents	Third oversized 25-cent piece in RCM history
Avro Anson	1990	20 Dollars	Canadian Aviation

== B ==
Name	Year	Denomination	Special Notes
Sir Frank Wilton Baillie	1992	20 Dollars	Aviation Series
F.W. Baldwin	1991	20 Dollars	Aviation Series
W.C. Russell Bannock	1995	20 Dollars	Aviation Series
Batman	2016	10 Dollars	Batman v Superman
Batman	2016	20 Dollars	Batman v Superman
Batman	2016	30 Dollars	Batman v Superman: Dawn of Justice
Jean Beliveau	2005	50 Cents	Hockey Legends
Alexander Graham Bell	1997	100 Dollars	150th Birthday
Alexander Graham Bell	2022	1 Dollar	175th Anniversary of the Birth of Alexander Graham Bell
Alexander Graham Bell	2022	Silver Dollar	175th Anniversary of the Birth of Alexander Graham Bell
Norman Bethune	1998	5 Dollars	60th Anniversary of Dr. Bethune's arrival in China
Norman Bethune	2011	5 Dollars	75th Anniversary of the First Mobile Blood Transfusion Vehicle
Bonhomme Carnaval	2001	50 cents	Festivals of Canada
Bonhomme Carnaval	2006	25 cents	Quebec Winter Carnival
Johnny Bower	2005	50 Cents	Hockey Legends
Johnny Bower	2015	10 Dollars	NHL Goalies
Joseph Brant (Thayendanegea)	2007	Silver Dollar	Gold plated version exclusive to 2007 Proof Set
Sir Isaac Brock	2012	25 cents	Bicentennial of the War of 1812
Sir Isaac Brock	2012	4 Dollars	Bicentennial of the War of 1812
Bugs Bunny	2015	10 Dollars	Part of Looney Tunes Fine Silver 8-Coin Subscription
Bugs Bunny	2015	20 Dollars	Looney Tunes Series
Bugs Bunny	2015	30 Dollars	Looney Tunes Classic Scenes

== C ==
Name	Year	Denomination	Special Notes
Sir George-Étienne Cartier	2015	20 Dollars	Father of Canadian Federation
Jacques Cartier	1984	1 Dollar	450th Anniversary of landing at Gaspe
Jacques Cartier	1984	100 Dollars	450th Anniversary of landing at Gaspe
Paul Cederberg	1973	25 cents	Centennial of RCMP
James A. Chamberlain	1996	20 Dollars	Aviation Series
Gerry Cheevers	2015	10 Dollars	NHL Goalies
Santa Claus	2004	25 cents	Holiday Coin Set
Santa Claus	2006	25 cents	Holiday Coin set
Santa Claus	2008	25 cents	Holiday Coin set
Santa Claus	2009	25 cents	Holiday Coin set
Santa Claus	2010	25 cents	Holiday Coin set
Santa Claus	2010	50 cents	Christmas
Santa Claus	2011	50 cents	Christmas
Santa Claus	2012	25 cents	Holiday Coin set
Santa Claus	2012	50 cents	Father Christmas
Kathleen "Kit" Coleman	2023	Silver Dollar	125th Anniversary of her status as North America’s first accredited woman war correspondent
James Cook	2018	Silver Dollar	240th Anniversary of Captain Cook at Nootka Sound
Wile E. Coyote	2015	10 Dollars	Part of Looney Tunes Fine Silver 8-Coin Subscription
Wile E. Coyote	2015	30 Dollars	Looney Tunes Classic Scenes

== D ==
Name	Year	Denomination	Special Notes
Samuel de Champlain	1992	100 Dollars	350th Anniversary of Montreal
Samuel de Champlain	2008	1 Dollar	To commemorate 400th anniversary of Quebec City
Samuel de Champlain	2015	3 Dollars	400th Anniversary of Samuel de Chaplain in Huronia
Charles-Michel de Salaberry	2012	25 cents	Bicentennial of the War of 1812
Charles-Michel de Salaberry	2012	4 Dollars	Bicentennial of the War of 1812
Viola Desmond	2019	20 Dollars	
Daffy Duck	2015	10 Dollars	Part of Looney Tunes Fine Silver 8-Coin Subscription
Daffy Duck	2015	20 Dollars	Looney Tunes Series

== E ==
Name	Year	Denomination	Special Notes
Albert Einstein	2015	100 Dollars	100th Anniversary of the General Theory of Relativity

== F ==
Name	Year	Denomination	Special Notes
J.E. Fauquier	1990	20 Dollars	Aviation Series
Robert H. (Bob) Fowler	1999	20 Dollars	Aviation Series
Terry Fox	2005	1 Dollar	Coin was issued for circulation
Simon Fraser	2008	200 Dollars	Mintage of 5,000 coins
Sir Martin Frobisher	2007	20 Dollars	International Polar Year
Elmer Fudd	2015	30 Dollars	Looney Tunes Classic Scenes

== G ==
Name	Year	Denomination	Special Notes
Paul Gagnon	1998	20 Dollars	Aviation Series
Phillip C. Garratt	1991	20 Dollars	Aviation Series
Eddie Giacomin	2015	10 Dollars	NHL Goalies
Stuart Graham	1994	20 Dollars	Aviation Series
Wayne Gretzky	2011	25 cents	Hockey player

== H ==
Name	Year	Denomination	Special Notes
Chris Hadfield	2006	30 Dollars	Installation of the Canadarm2
Chris Hadfield	2006	300 Dollars	
Glenn Hall	2015	10 Dollars	NHL Goalies
Paul Henderson	1997	1 Dollar	25th Anniversary of the Canada-Russia hockey series of 1972
Edward Higgins	1997	20 Dollars	Aviation Series
Tim Horton	2005	50 cents	Hockey Legends

== J ==
Name	Year	Denomination	Special Notes
Pope John Paul II	2005	10 Dollars	Memorial Coin
Pope John Paul II	2005	75 Dollars	Memorial Coin
Pope John Paul II	2014	10 Dollars	Canonization of Pope John Paul II

== K ==
Name	Year	Denomination	Special Notes
Henry Kelsey	1990	Silver Dollar	300th Anniversary of Kelsey's journey to the prairies
Dave Keon	2005	50 cents	Hockey Legends
Captain Kirk	2016	10 Dollars	Star Trek Series
Cindy Klassen	2010	25 cents	Part of Vancouver Olympic coins collection

== L ==
Name	Year	Denomination	Special Notes
Guy Lafleur	2005	50 cents	Hockey Legends
Robert Leckie	1990	20 Dollars	Aviation Series
Foghorn Leghorn	2015	10 Dollars	Part of Looney Tunes Fine Silver 8-Coin Subscription
John Lennon	2019	20 Dollars	Give Peace a Chance
Zebulon Lewis Leigh	1993	20 Dollars	Aviation Series
William S. Longhurst	1998	20 Dollars	Aviation Series

== M ==
Name	Year	Denomination	Special Notes
Sir John A. Macdonald	2015	2 Dollars	200th Anniversary of the Birth of Sir John A. Macdonald
Sir John A. Macdonald	2015	20 Dollars	
Alexander Mackenzie	1989	Silver Dollar	Bicentennial of the voyage to the Arctic Ocean via the Mackenzie River
Maisonneuve	1992	100 Dollars	Montreal, 350th Anniversary
Guglielmo Marconi	2001	5 Dollars	100th Anniversary of the First Trans-Atlantic Radio
Marvin the Martian	2015	10 Dollars	Part of Looney Tunes Fine Silver 8-Coin Subscription
John McCrae	2015	2 Dollars	100th Anniversary of "In Flanders Fields" Poem
John McCrae	2015	3 Dollars	100th Anniversary of "In Flanders Fields" Poem
John A.D. McCurdy	1991	20 Dollars	Aviation Series
Miga	2008	25 cents	2010 Vancouver Olympic Mascot

== N ==
Name	Year	Denomination	Special Notes
George A. Neal	1999	20 Dollars	Aviation Series
J. Omer (Bob) Noury	1995	20 Dollars	Aviation Series

== O ==
Name	Year	Denomination	Special Notes
Odin	2019	20 Dollars	Norse Gods
Yoko Ono	2019	20 Dollars	Give Peace a Chance

== P ==
Name	Year	Denomination	Special Notes
Oscar Peterson	2022	1 Dollar	Celebrating Oscar Peterson
Oscar Peterson	2022	20 Dollars	Celebrating Oscar Peterson
Porky Pig	2015	10 Dollars	Part of Looney Tunes Fine Silver 8-Coin Subscription
Jacques Plante	2005	50 cents	Hockey Legends
Jacques Plante	2015	10 Dollars	NHL Goalies
Georgina Pope	2012	5 Dollars	Georgina Pope's 150th Birthday
Optimus Prime	2019	25 cents	Transformers

== Q ==
Name	Year	Denomination	Special Notes
Quatchi	2008	25 cents	2010 Vancouver Olympic Mascot

== R ==
Name	Year	Denomination	Special Notes
Wilfred T. Reid	1994	20 Dollars	Aviation Series
Maurice Richard	2005	50 cents	Hockey Legends
James Armstrong Richardson, Sr.	1993	20 Dollars	Aviation Series
Louis Riel	2019	Silver Dollar	Celebration of Louis Riel
Road Runner	2015	10 Dollars	Part of Looney Tunes Fine Silver 8-Coin Subscription
Road Runner	2015	30 Dollars	Looney Tunes Classic Scenes

== S ==
Name	Year	Denomination	Special Notes
Terry Sawchuk	2015	10 Dollars	NHL Goalies
Scotty (Star Trek)	2016	10 Dollars	Star Trek Series
Laura Secord	2012	25 cents	Bicentennial of the War of 1812
Laura Secord	2012	4 Dollars	Bicentennial of the War of 1812
Murton A. Seymour	1992	20 Dollars	Aviation Series
Darryl Sittler	2005	50 cents	Hockey Legends
Sumi	2008	25 cents	2010 Vancouver Olympic Mascot
Spock	2016	10 Dollars	Star Trek Series
Supergirl	2015	10 Dollars	DC Comics Original Series
Superman	2013	50 cents	Superman's 75th Anniversary
Superman	2013	15 Dollars	Superman's 75th Anniversary
Superman	2015	10 Dollars	DC Comics Original Series
Superman	2015	20 Dollars	Legendary Super Heroes: Superman
Superman	2015	100 Dollars	Iconic Superman Comic Book Covers
Superman	2016	10 Dollars	Batman v Superman
Superman	2016	20 Dollars	Batman v Superman
Superman	2016	30 Dollars	Batman v Superman: Dawn of Justice
Sylvester the Cat	2015	10 Dollars	Part of Looney Tunes Fine Silver 8-Coin Subscription
Sylvester the Cat	2015	20 Dollars	Looney Tunes Series
Sylvester the Cat	2015	30 Dollars	Looney Tunes Classic Scenes

== T ==
Name	Year	Denomination	Special Notes
Tasmanian Devil (Looney Tunes)	2015	10 Dollars	Part of Looney Tunes Fine Silver 8-Coin Subscription
Tecumseh	2012	25 cents	Bicentennial of the War of 1812
Tecumseh	2012	4 Dollars	Bicentennial of the War of 1812
David Thompson	2014	15 Dollars	Exploring Canada Series
Tweety Bird	2015	10 Dollars	Part of Looney Tunes Fine Silver 8-Coin Subscription
Tweety Bird	2015	20 Dollars	Looney Tunes Series
Tweety Bird	2015	30 Dollars	Looney Tunes Classic Scenes

== U ==
Name	Year	Denomination	Special Notes
Nyota Uhura	2016	10 Dollars	Star Trek Series

== V ==
Name	Year	Denomination	Special Notes
Fern Villeneuve	1997	20 Dollars	Aviation Series

== W ==
Name	Year	Denomination	Special Notes
Wonder Woman	2016	10 Dollars	Batman v Superman
Wonder Woman	2016	20 Dollars	DC Comics Originals Series
Wonder Woman	2016	30 Dollars	Batman v Superman: Dawn of Justice

== Z ==
Name	Year	Denomination	Special Notes
Janusz Zurakowski	1996	20 Dollars	Aviation Series
