= Soohorang and Bandabi =

Mascots of the 2018 Winter Olympics and Paralympics

- Soohorang (left), the mascot of the Olympics, and Bandabi (right), the mascot of the Paralympics

Mascots of the 2018 Winter Olympics and 2018 Winter Paralympics (Pyeongchang)
- Significance: A white tiger and an Asiatic black bear

- Soohorang and Bandabi
- Hangul: 수호랑, 반다비
- RR: Suhorang, Bandabi
- MR: Suhorang, Pandabi

Soohorang (Korean: 수호랑) is the official mascot of the 2018 Winter Olympics, and Bandabi (Korean: 반다비) is the official mascot of the 2018 Winter Paralympics. Both events were held in Pyeongchang, Gangwon, South Korea. Soohorang is a white tiger and Bandabi is an Asiatic black bear. The mascots were selected through a national tender process held in 2014 and were approved of by the International Olympic Committee (IOC) on June 2, 2016.

== Selection ==
On June 27, 2014, the Pyeongchang Organizing Committee notified the public of their mascot selection contest. The selection process took place from September 15, 2014 to September 30, 2014. On June 2, 2016, the International Olympic Committee approved the mascots for the games.

== Characteristics ==
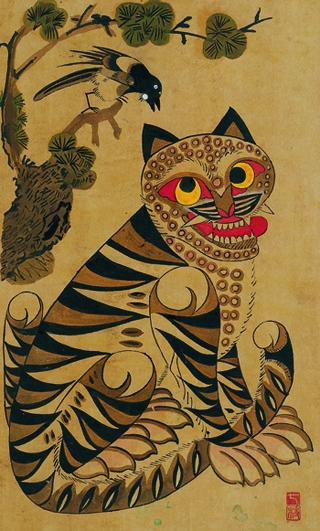
Horang-i (tiger) and Kkachi (magpie)

=== Soohorang ===
Soohorang is the mascot of the 2018 Winter Olympics. "Sooho" means "protection" in Korean, symbolizing the protection offered to the athletes, participants and spectators at the Winter Olympics, as well as preserving the world peace that is the spirit of the Olympic Games. "Rang" derives from "Ho-rang-i", the Korean word for "tiger"; it is also the last letter of "Jeongseon Arirang", a cherished traditional Korean folk song of Gangwon Province.

Soohorang took her motif from the white tiger, known as "baekho" in Korean, which is considered to be Korea's sacred guardian animal. Her colour is also indicative of the snow and ice of winter sports.

Tigers have long been a notable aspect of Korean folklore and culture. Baekho, the white tiger, is described in myths and narratives as a divine imaginary animal that watches over the mountains and nature. A cultural symbol for prosperity and protection, Baekho is revered as a god who cares for humanity, praying for the peace and well-being of the village in Korean folklore, while maintaining the continuity of Hodori which was the mascot of the 1988 Summer Olympics in Seoul. It has also been noted that Baekho is in harmony with the Winter Games that take place in "the white fields of snow".

In summary, Soohorang is full of "passion and enthusiasm" and "a strong personality that protects the people who participate in the Olympics."

=== Bandabi ===
Bandabi is the mascot of the 2018 Winter Paralympics. The mascot symbolyses South Korean mythology and is closely related with culture and traditional folklore. He is a symbol of will and courage. "Banda" means "half-moon" or a "half-moon beast", and "bi" means to celebrate the competition.

Bandabi is a warm-hearted friend who "has strong will and courage, is at the forefront of equality and harmony," and supports the enthusiasm of the players in the Paralympics.

Bandabi also has a continuity with Gomdoori, which was a mascot at the 1988 Summer Paralympics in Seoul. The Asiatic Black Bear is also the symbol animal of Gangwon Province, in PyeongChang. Bandabi and Soohorang were launched on 2 June 2016, where the design~~er~~ company from Seoul Mass C&G was chosen for the mascot selection contest.

== Media ==
=== Emoticons ===
Soohorang and Bandabi are available as animated emoticons in KakaoTalk, a popular messaging, texting, or communication application in South Korea.

== Reception ==
The public reception to the mascots has been described as overwhelmingly positive. According to Hannah Keyser, a writer for sports news website Deadspin, the mascots could be found "everywhere" during the Olympics, and they were "surprisingly universally beloved". Dan McQuade, another writer for Deadspin, commented that it will be difficult for Miraitowa and Someity to match the popularity of Soohorang and Bandabi.

== Gallery ==
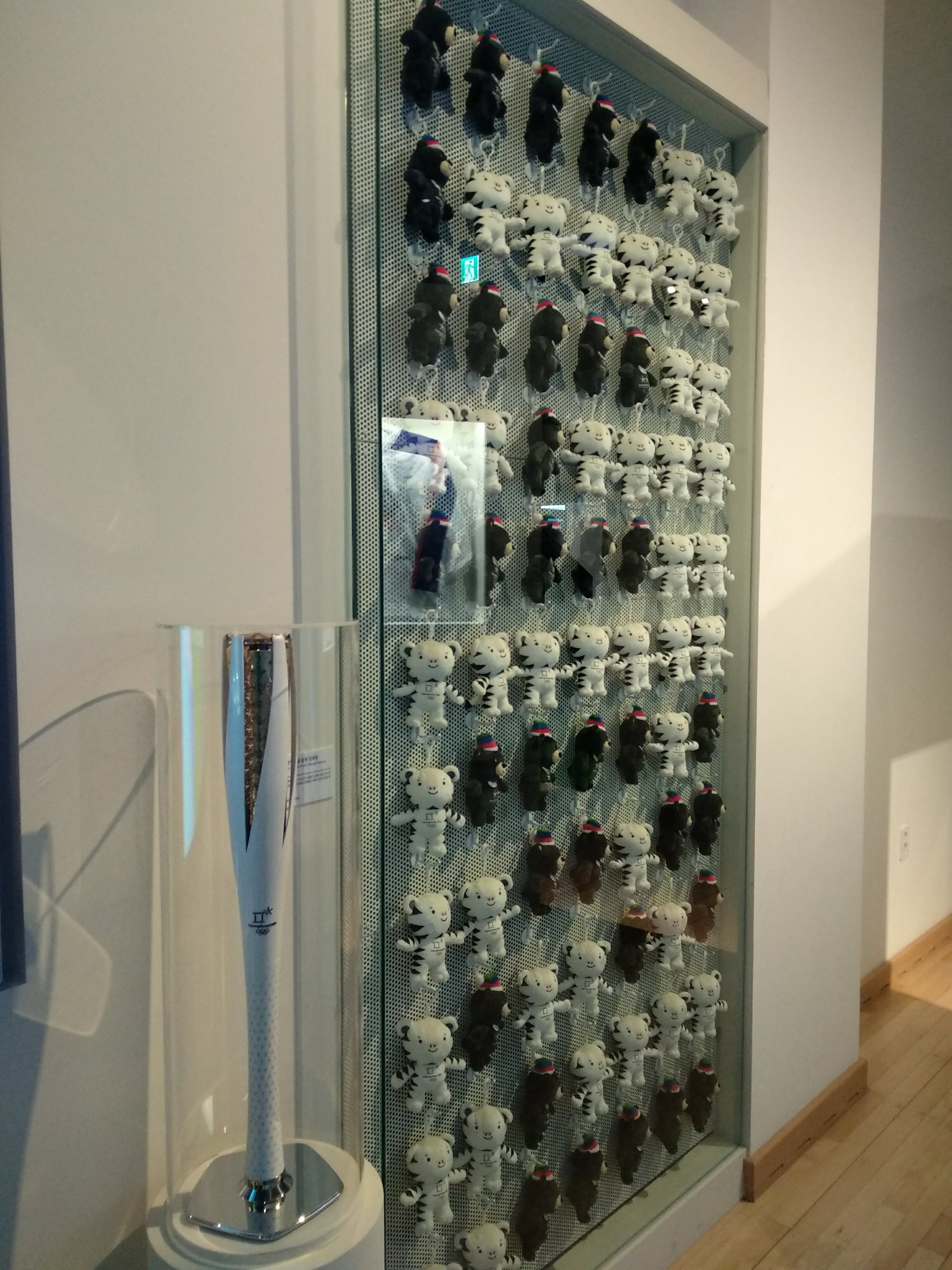
Torch & Mascots

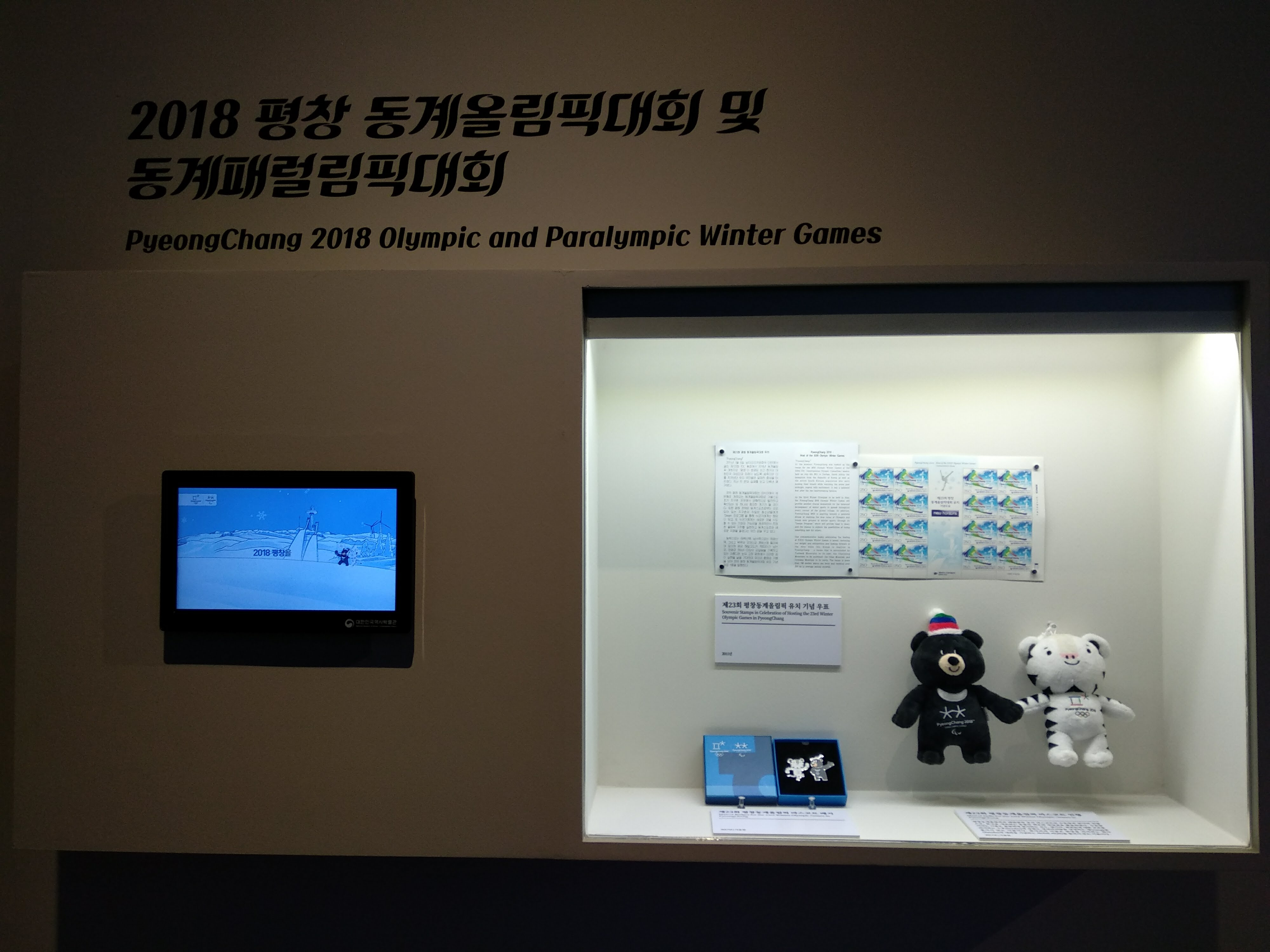
Olympic materials

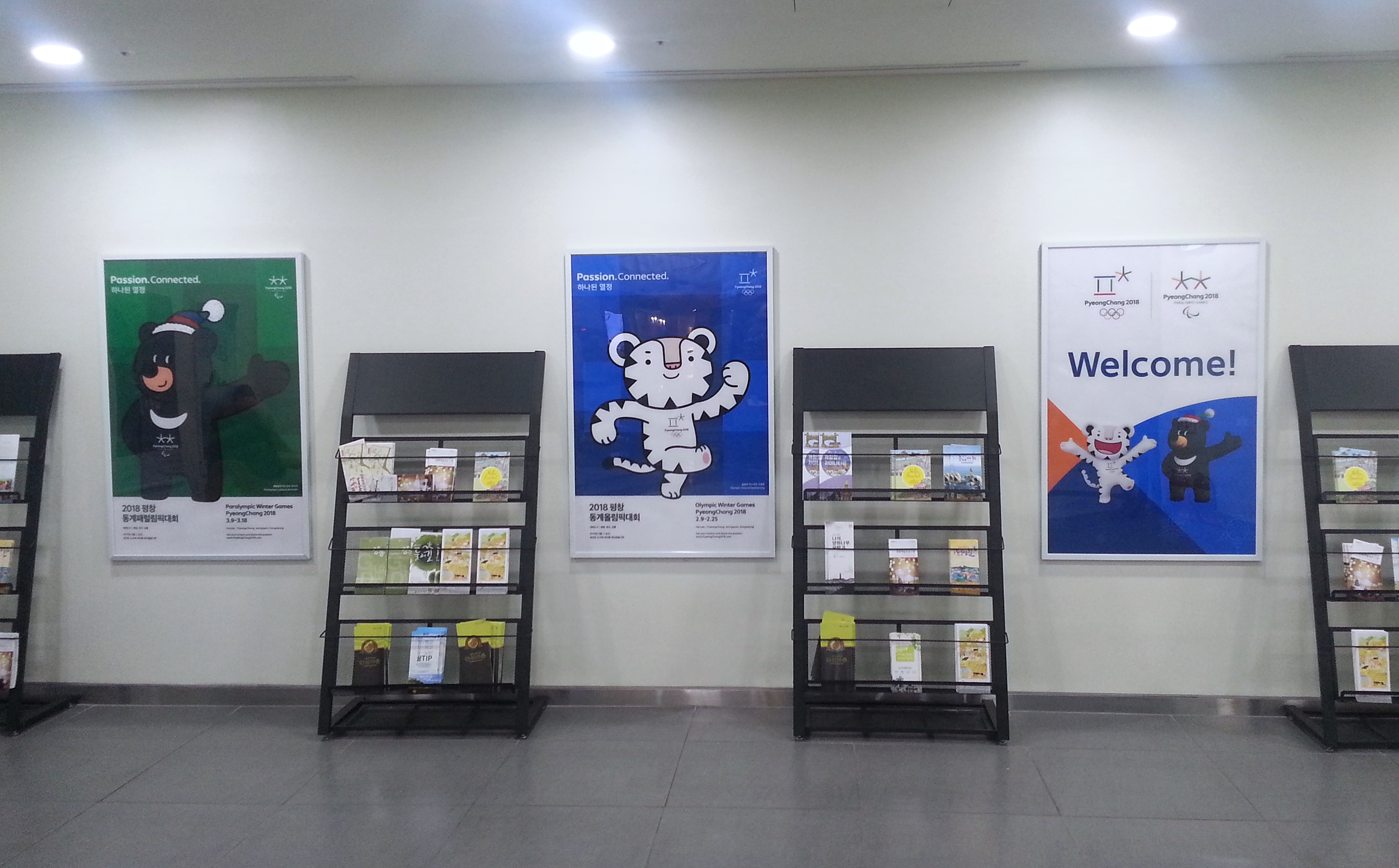
Olympic promotion materials

== See also ==
- Hodori – the mascot of the 1988 Summer Olympics in Seoul, South Korea
- Tigers in Korean culture

Preceded by Vinicius	Olympic mascot Soohorang; Pyeongchang 2018	Succeeded by Miraitowa
Preceded by Tom	Paralympic mascot Bandabi; Pyeongchang 2018	Succeeded by Someity
