= Phryges =

Official mascots of the 2024 Summer Olympics and Paralympics in Paris

Olympic Phryge (left), the mascot of the Olympics, and Paralympic Phryge (right), the mascot of the Paralympics. Both mascots were designed by Jules Dubost and Gilles Deleris

The Phryges (French: [fʁiʒ]) were the official mascots of the 2024 Summer Olympics and 2024 Summer Paralympics in Paris. They are anthropomorphic Phrygian caps, a French symbol of liberty.

== History ==
=== Background ===
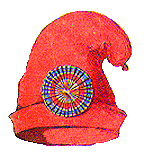
The Phrygian cap, a symbol of liberty, inspired the design of the Phryges.

The Phrygian cap, a soft hat typically in red, was traditionally worn by freed slaves in Phrygia, an ancient kingdom located in present-day Turkey. Since the 1789 storming of the Bastille state prison, which began the French Revolution, the Phrygian cap was worn as a symbol of liberty, including during the 1924 Summer Olympics in Paris. Marianne, the national personification of France, is often depicted wearing a Phrygian cap.

The Phryges were designed by Gilles Deleris and Jules Dubost.

=== Unveiling ===
On 14 November 2022, with the reveal of the Paris 2024 mascot, they were advertised as "sporty, party-loving and so French." Tony Estanguet, president of the organizing committee, said that an "ideal" was chosen over an animal, elaborating on the cap's symbol of freedom and meaning to French people. He added that the Paralympics mascot's disability "also sends a strong message: to promote inclusion."

== Characteristics ==
The Phryges are portrayed as two red triangular-shaped anthropomorphic caps. They have arms in a slope and present their top parts flopping forward. The Paris 2024 emblem is visible on their chests, and their eyes are adorned by tricolor ribbons portraying the French flag, paying homage to the cockade of France. The Olympic Phryge has two blue sneakers, while the Paralympic Phryge wears a prosthesis and a red sneaker on the other leg.

Each Phryge was given a personality. The Olympic Phryge is "the smart one" with a "methodical mind and alluring charm," whereas the Paralympic Phryge is "a party animal, spontaneous and a bit hotheaded."

== Intellectual property and merchandising ==
The IOC maintains exclusive ownership and control of the use of Olympic Symbols through an international treaty, the Nairobi Treaty on the Protection of the Olympic Symbol.

The mascots are not to be used freely and generate revenues from granting exclusive rights, such as worldwide marking to commercial partners. IP protected assets of the Olympic Games properties come in different forms, such as:

- Trademark of the Olympic Phryge : The Paris 2024 mascots are registered trademarks in France under the names “La Phryge Olympique" and "La Phryge Paralympique”.
- Design of the Phryges : The shapes of the Olympic Phryges fall under design rights. The Hague System safeguards the design of the Phryges internationally to prevent infringements.

Doudou & Compagnie announced a sale of over one million Phryge plush toys, with projections indicating a reach of 1.3 million units by the end of the sales cycle. The Olympic and Paralympic Phryge mascots were present on more than 150 merchandise items in the Olympic online shop alone. Condoms featuring images of the Phryges were produced as well.

The revenues generated through the IOC's use of IP rights are redistributed across the Olympic Movement to individual athletes, Organising Committees, NOCs, International Sports Federations and other sports organizations.

== Reception ==
In France, criticisms have been made about most of the toy replicas of the mascot being made in China. Julie Matikhine, director of the Paris 2024 brand, responded that "18 percent of the stuffed toys produced by the company Doudou & Compagnie will be in Brittany," in the hope of "relocating part of the sector."

The Phryges have been likened to a giant "clitoris in trainers", and have been nicknamed les clitos nationales (the national clitorises) and les clitos olympiques (the olympic clitorises) by French netizens. The French newspaper Libération hailed it as a revolutionary departure from the traditional phallic architecture of the Eiffel Tower. Foreigners were noted to compare the Phryges to the poop emoji or a tongue.

== See also ==
- Symbolism in the French Revolution
- List of Olympic mascots
- List of Paralympic mascots

Preceded by Bing Dwen Dwen	Olympic mascot The Olympic Phryge; Paris 2024	Succeeded by Tina
Preceded by Shuey Rhon Rhon	Paralympic mascot The Paralympic Phryge; Paris 2024	Succeeded by Milo
