= Noggi and Joggi =

Mascots of the 1980 Summer Paralympics

Mascot of the 1980 Summer Paralympics (Arnhem)
- Creator: Necky Oprinsen
- Significance: A pair of squirrels

Noggi and Joggi were the official mascots of the 1980 Summer Paralympics held in Arnhem, Netherlands. A pair of squirrels, they were the first ever Paralympic mascots.

A squirrel was chosen as the mascot as it was common in the forests around National Sports Centre Papendal. According to Paralympic researcher Dr. Ian Brittain, a squirrel was also chosen because it gets many hard nuts to crack in its lifetime, not unlike people with disabilities who face adversity.

Dutch broadcaster AVRO organized a design competition on its Sportpanorama program where contestants were asked to send in handmade squirrel models. The entries were judged by a jury which included table tennis player Irene Schmidt and celebrities Martine Bijl, Herman van Veen, Rien Poortvliet and Bert Haanstra. The winning design was a pair of squirrels – one male and one female – created by Necky Oprinsen from Sint-Michielsgestel. The squirrels were crocheted and formed a married couple. This design formed the basis for the official mascots that would be used in publications and other media appearances. As a prize, Oprinsen was offered a trip for two to New York City by Princess Margriet of the Netherlands, the patron of the Games.

The mascots were printed on memorabilia sold at Arnhem. Plush toys were also created.

Preceded by First event mascots	Paralympic mascots Noggi and Joggi; Arnhem 1980	Succeeded by Dan D. Lion
