= Schuss =

Mascot of the 1968 Winter Olympics

Mascot of the 1968 Winter Olympics (Grenoble)
- Creator: Aline Lafargue
- Significance: Abstract figure on skis with the colors of the flag of France

Schuss ([ʃʊs], primarily German for 'shot', but also the same as the English noun 'schuss', i.e. a high speed ski run directly down a slope) was the unofficial Olympic mascot of the 1968 Winter Olympics in Grenoble, France, a one-legged humanoid skier with a large red and white head. Schuss is often considered the first Olympic mascot, and appeared on pins, small toys, and cardboard cutouts. Every subsequent Olympic Games has featured a mascot excluding the 1972 Winter Olympics in Sapporo, Japan, which only had an unofficial mascot, Takuchan.

In alpine skiing, a Schuss is German for a straight downhill run at high speed, similar as the noun schuss in English.

Schuss was designed by Aline Lafargue, a Paris film animator known for creating the children's program Le Petit Lion. She was informed of the contest with less than a day before the deadline, and had only one night to prepare her submission. There were no guidelines, and the only comparable reference was Willie, mascot of the 1966 FIFA World Cup in England. After considering a St. Bernard dog, lizard, chamois, and a snowman, Lafargue settled on the abstract character, and was selected the following day as the winner. Schuss was painted in the colors of France: blue, red and, white.

An initial mascot design was Dof, the skiing dolphin.

== Reception and legacy ==
Schuss's head features incorrect Olympic rings which are not connected, and the character was not authorized by the Grenoble Organising Committee.

Schuss was "devoid of any endearing qualities", according to the Journal of Olympic History, which notes it was "ridiculed by some people as a 'Tadpole on a Skate' or a 'Sperm on a Ski'". Georges Pompidou, prime minister of France, endorsed Schuss as an "emblematic character of the Olympics". Schuss is now recognized by the International Olympic Committee as a mascot, though at the time, the Organising Committee referred to Schuss as a "character".
