= Miga, Quatchi, Sumi and Mukmuk =

Official mascots for the 2010 Winter Olympics and Paralympics in Vancouver, Canada

- From left to right: Sumi, Quatchi, Miga, and Mukmuk

Mascots of the 2010 Winter Olympics and 2010 Winter Paralympics (Vancouver)
- Creator: Meomi Design

Miga and Quatchi were the official mascots of the 2010 Winter Olympics, Sumi was the official mascot of the 2010 Winter Paralympics, and Mukmuk was their designated "sidekick" for both games, held in Vancouver, British Columbia, Canada. The four mascots were introduced on November 27, 2007. They were designed by the Canadian and American design studio, Meomi Design. It was the first time (since Cobi and Petra) that the Olympic and Paralympic mascots were introduced at the same time.

== Development ==
The emblem of 2010 Winter Olympics, "Ilanaaq the Inukshuk", was picked through an open contest. However, it met criticism from some indigenous groups over its design, so the mascot artist was selected through a competition.

Through a process where 177 professionals around the world submitted their ideas, five were made final. In December 2006, VANOC eventually selected concepts from Meomi Design. Formed in 2002, Meomi is a group comprising Vicki Wong, a Vancouver-born Canadian of Chinese descent who worked in graphic and web design, and Michael Murphy, born in Milford, Michigan, who worked in design and motion graphics. Writing for Sports Illustrated, experts Michael Erdmann and John Ryan, while making comments on the mascots of the Olympic Games held in Canada, pointed out that the Meomi character drawing styles "are more closely related to Urban Vinyl [...]".

After the selection, Meomi provided more than 20 different concepts to VANOC, and three concepts were selected. The conception of the mascots was based on the local wildlife, as well as First Nations legends, mythologies and legendary creatures. During the design process, an early name for Quatchi was dismissed when the undisclosed word was found to have a rude connotation in another language. An animated video by Buck, a design studio based in New York and Los Angeles, with music provided by Kid Koala, was screened at the first public presentation of the mascots. Details about the mascots were kept secret until November 27, 2007, when they were unveiled to the public.

== Mascots ==
The first public presentation of the mascots took place before 800 schoolchildren at the Bell Centre for Performing Arts in Surrey, British Columbia. This represented the first time (since 1992) that the Olympic and Paralympic mascots were introduced at the same time. Miga and Quatchi were mascots for the 2010 Winter Olympics, while Sumi was the mascot for the 2010 Winter Paralympics. Mukmuk was their designated "sidekick". They made a cameo appearance in Mario & Sonic at the Olympic Winter Games.

=== Olympic mascots ===
==== Miga ====
Miga is described as "a small, mischievous and outgoing "sea bear" ". She is based on the legend of the Pacific Northwest First Nations that the orca whale transforms into bears when they are on land.

==== Quatchi ====
Quatchi is described as a "big, gentle and shy sasquatch". He enjoys hockey, and wants to become a world-famous goalie.

==== Mukmuk ====
Mukmuk is a Vancouver Island marmot. His name is derived from the Chinuk Wawa word for food or to eat; "muckamuck" as he adores eating. He is the only mascot that represents a real animal.

=== Paralympic Mascot ===
==== Sumi ====
Sumi’s name originates from "Sumesh," the Salish word for “guardian spirit”. Designed as a mythical creature called a chimera Sumi consists of three different beings that are originally included in the legends of First Nations. Reflecting the myths, he wears a hat of an orca whale, has legs of a bear and own wings of a bird. His combination represents the diverse backgrounds of both Canadians and Para athletes competing in Vancouver 2010 Paralympic Games. He is described as "an animal guardian spirit, is a natural-born leader with a passion for protecting the environment".

== Reception ==
=== Popularity ===
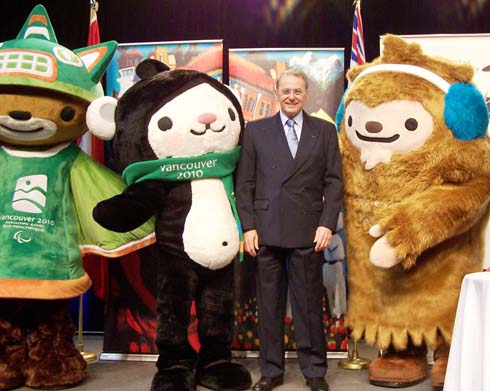
Jacques Rogge posing with the mascots

Mukmuk, although a designated "sidekick", was a run-away success, "capturing the hearts of Games-goers everywhere", including an impromptu "protest" at the Vancouver Art Gallery to make him a full-fledged mascot. In 2008, Vancouver Sun journalist, Jeff Lee, created the "Free Mukuk" campaign, to make Mukmuk an official mascot. Mukmuk made the "Top 5" for the Olympic games in the Vancouver edition of 24 Hours.

=== Criticism and image confusion ===
When the mascots were unveiled, there were initial concerns over whether they were effective at representing British Columbia and Canada.

On July 3, 2009, Canadian artist Michael R. Barrick created two composite images—one based on the official art, and the other based on a fan art created by Angela Melick—depicting the official mascots alongside Pedobear, an internet meme popularized by the imageboard 4chan. The images were created to make "a visual critique of how the style of the mascots resembles the style of Pedobear." As a result of the images receiving high rankings on Google Images, this image was mistakenly used by other media. The Polish newspaper Gazeta Olsztyńska used one of the images for a front-page story about the then-upcoming Olympics, published on February 4, 2010. Similarly, the Dutch television guide Avrobode used one of the images.

== After the games ==
After the games, 48 of the 61 life-sized mascot costumes were destroyed. Three full sets of costumes are kept in Canada, one full set has gone to the IOC in Switzerland, and one Sumi costume has gone to the International Paralympic Committee in Germany.

== See also ==
- Bigfoot in popular culture
- Olympic mascots
- Paralympic mascots

Preceded by The Fuwa	Olympic mascot Miga, Quatchi and Mukmuk; Vancouver 2010	Succeeded by Wenlock
Preceded by Fu Niu Lele	Paralympic mascot Sumi and Mukmuk; Vancouver 2010	Succeeded by Mandeville
