= Tina and Milo =

Official mascots of the 2026 Winter Olympics and Paralympics

- Official artwork of Tina (left) and Milo (right), surrounded by the Flo
- Created by: Students of the Istituto Comprensivo di Taverna

In-universe information
- Species: Stoat
- Nationality: Italian

Tina and Milo are the official mascots of the Milano Cortina 2026 Winter Olympic and Winter Paralympic Games. They are two anthropomorphic stoats.

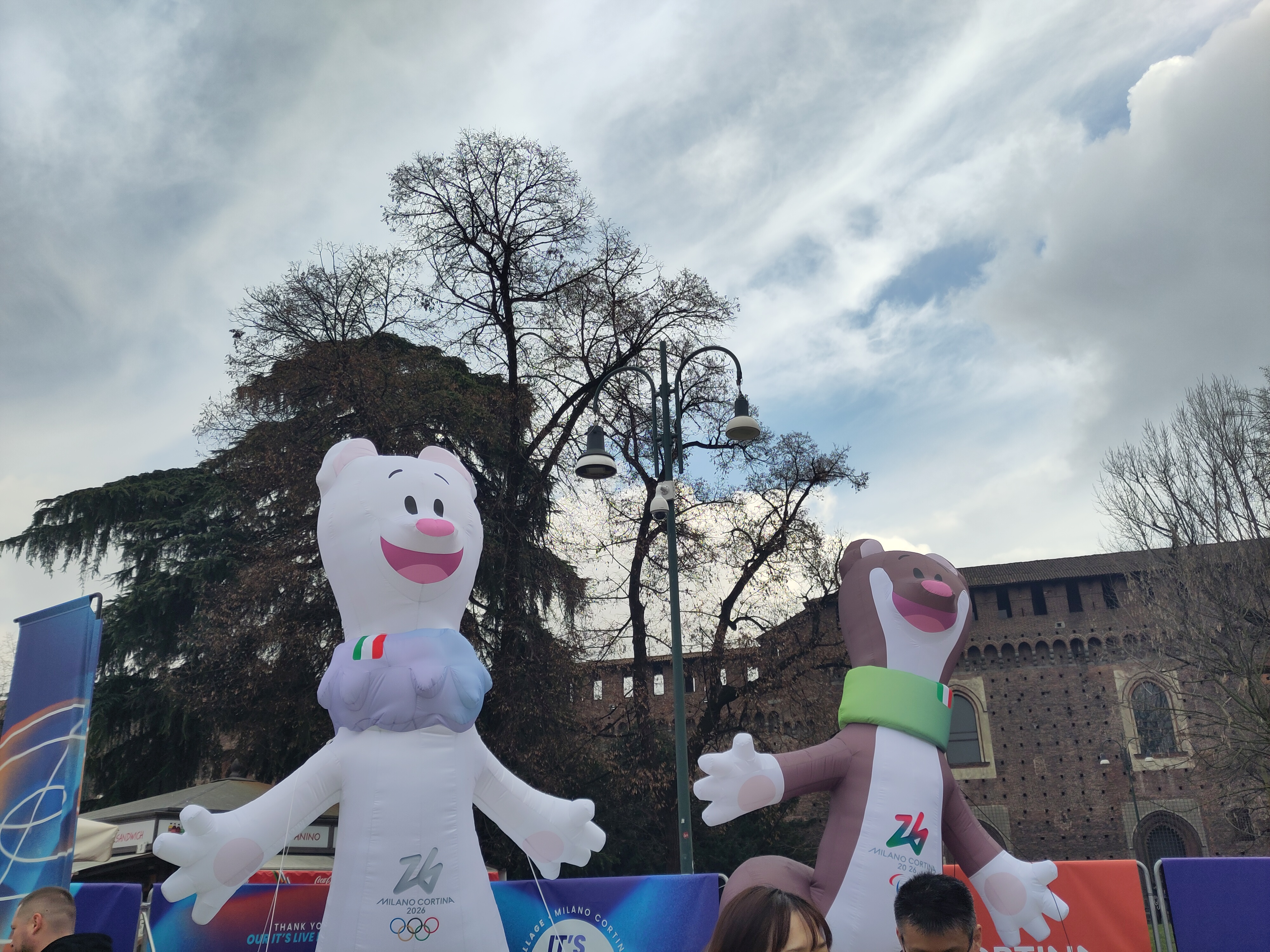
Tina and Milo in the Winter Olympics Milan Fan zone at the Sforza Castle, 12 February 2026

Tina and Milo were the winners of a public poll with more than 1,600 entries for the designs of the 2026 Milano Cortina mascots. The designs were all drawn by Italian students aged 6 to 14. Tina and Milo, designed by students at the Istituto Comprensivo Taverna, won with 53 percent of votes. The contest was a collaboration between the Fondazione Milano Cortina 2026 and the Italian Ministry of Education. The mascots were named after the Italian cities of Cortina d'Ampezzo (Tina) and Milan (Milo). Their designs were unveiled on 7 February at the Sanremo Music Festival 2024.

Tina and Milo are siblings. Tina, the Olympic mascot, has a white coat and moved from the mountains of Italy to the city to explore new things. Her brother Milo, the Paralympic mascot, has a brown coat and was born without a leg, but uses his tail to help him walk instead of normal legs. The student designers of Tina and Milo said that stoats are symbols of innocence and purity, and that the two of them having different coat colours represents duality and diversity. Stoats change fur colour with the seasons, being brown-and-white in summer and entirely white in winter. The Milano Cortina 2026 Organising Committee described the pair as the "first openly Gen Z mascots". Tina and Milo are accompanied by a team of six anthropomorphic snowdrop flowers called the Flo. The Flo are based on the runner-up designs in the mascot contest, designed by the students of the Istituto Comprensivo Sabin di Segrate. They symbolise hopefulness and resilience.

In 2025, Italy produced a series of Euro coin designs to commemorate the 2026 Winter Olympics and Paralympics, with some featuring images of Tina and Milo.

== See also ==
- List of fictional characters with disabilities
- List of fictional musteloids

Preceded by The Olympic Phryge	Olympic mascot Tina; Milano Cortina 2026	Succeeded by TBA
Preceded by The Paralympic Phryge	Paralympic mascot Milo; Milano Cortina 2026	Succeeded by TBA
