= Wenlock and Mandeville =

Official mascots of the 2012 Summer Olympics and Paralympics in London

Wenlock (left), mascot of the Olympics, and Mandeville (right), mascot of the Paralympics

Wenlock is the official mascot for the 2012 Summer Olympics, and Mandeville is the official mascot for the 2012 Summer Paralympics, both held in London, England, United Kingdom. Named after Much Wenlock and Stoke Mandeville, they were created by Iris, a London-based creative agency. The mascots were unveiled on 19 May 2010, marking the second time (after Vancouver's Miga, Quatchi, Sumi and Mukmuk) that both Olympic and Paralympic mascots were unveiled at the same time.

== Characteristics ==
According to the associated (fictional) storyline by Michael Morpurgo, they were formed from the last girder of the Olympic Stadium. Their skins are made of highly polished steel allowing them to reflect the personalities and appearances of the people they meet. Their one eye is a camera and on their heads are yellow lights symbolizing those of a London Taxi.

=== Wenlock ===
Wenlock's name is inspired by Much Wenlock in Shropshire, England, where in 1850 the Wenlock Olympian Society held its first Olympian Games, regarded as an inspiration for the modern Olympic games. The five friendship rings on his wrists correspond to the five Olympic rings, and three points on his head represent the three places on the podium. The pattern on his body symbolises the whole world coming to London, and the shape of his helmet represents the shape of the Olympic Stadium.

=== Mandeville ===
Mandeville is named after Stoke Mandeville Hospital in Aylesbury, Buckinghamshire. In 1948, Stoke Mandeville Hospital organised the first Stoke Mandeville Games, considered to be the precursor to the Paralympics. The three spikes on Mandeville's helmet represent the Paralympic Agitos. He also represents friendship, curiosity, and determination. It has a time tracker watch on its wrist to track his times and constantly improve it. Taking challenges and not giving up if it fails the first time is one of his most featured characteristics, since it also portraits athletes' resilience.

== Animated shorts ==
Wenlock and Mandeville
- Genre: Sports; Fantasy; Animation
- Created by: Michael Morpurgo
- Composer: Thomas Hewitt Jones
- Country of origin: United Kingdom
- Original language: English
- No. of episodes: 4

Production
- Running time: 5-10 minutes
- Production company: Crystal CG

Original release
- Network: BBC; YouTube; UK Cinemas
- Release: 19 May 2010 – 28 May 2012

The British children book writer Michael Morpurgo wrote the story concept to go with Wenlock and Mandeville and an animation titled “Out of a Rainbow” was produced by the London office of Beijing-based Crystal CG. This was followed by a sequel, "Adventures on a Rainbow", which was released on 1 March 2011. The video featured guest appearances from Olympic athletes: Phillips Idowu, Shanaze Reade and Tom Daley as well as Paralympic athletes: Ellie Simmonds and Mandip Sehmi. These were followed by "Rainbow Rescue" (5 December 2011) and "Rainbow to the Games" (28 May 2012). The music for the animated films series was scored by British composer Thomas Hewitt Jones.

The official theme song, "On a Rainbow", was written by McFly's Tom Fletcher.

== Comic strip ==
The mascots featured in an Olympic-themed comic strip in The Beano, starting in issue 3601. The strip, written by Ryan C. Gavan and drawn by Nigel Parkinson, ran until the Olympics began in July 2012.

== Reception ==
The mascots received mixed reviews. Creative Review said "Both are clearly of the digital age. And we have to say, we think they look rather good". However, others were more critical, with one columnist claiming that the pair were the product of a "drunken one-night stand between a Teletubby and a Dalek". Others have compared the mascots to Izzy, the mascot of the 1996 Summer Olympics, another critically panned mascot. Still others have remarked that the pair resemble Kang and Kodos from The Simpsons. Media critic James Bridle has observed that the characters' huge eyes make them fitting mascots for London, the most surveilled city on earth, with the highest ratio of CCTV cameras to inhabitants.

Preceded by Miga, Quatchi and Mukmuk	Olympic mascot Wenlock; London 2012	Succeeded by Leopard, Zaika and Bely Mishka
Preceded by Sumi and Mukmuk	Paralympic mascot Mandeville; London 2012	Succeeded by Luchik and Snezhinka
