= Smoky (Olympic mascot) =

Dog and Olympic mascot

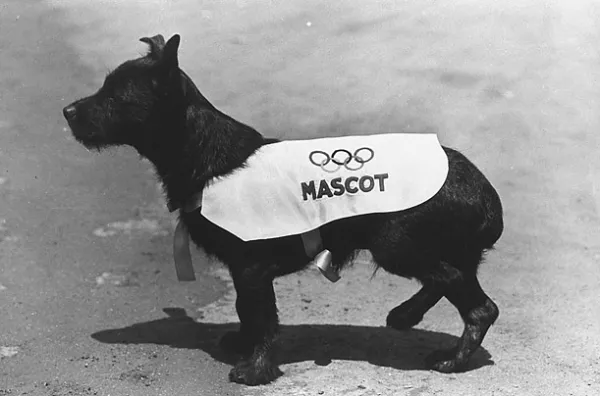
- Smoky wearing his mascot blanket
- Species: Canis familiaris
- Breed: Mongrel
- Sex: Male
- Died: April 1934
- Cause of death: Vehicular accident
- Known for: Being the mascot of the 1932 Summer Olympics

Smoky (1931 or 1932 – April 1934), occasionally spelled Smokey, was a dog who became the mascot of the 1932 Summer Olympics, specifically heralded by the approximately 2000 residents of the Olympic Village in Los Angeles. Smoky is sometimes considered the first Olympic mascot.

Smoky settled in the Los Angeles Olympic Village early in its preparation, with some sources claiming he was born the same day that construction began on 2 January 1932. He was a small black dog of uncertain ancestry, believed to be a combination of Scottish Terrier, bulldog, and Australian Sheep Dog along with other breeds. He became extremely popular with all visiting Olympic delegations, posing with athletes from all nations, and outfitted in a blanket that visitors pinned their medals, pins and many international badges on. During the games, he survived a couple of broken legs. Smoky briefly went missing on 14 July, with it claimed that "noted athletes from all over the world mourn his absence". However, he returned the next day.

After the games Smoky was adopted by Cynthia and Clark Smith and became a family pet. In April 1934 he was run over and killed by an unknown speeding motorist. His obituary in the Los Angeles Times said, "No resident of the village did more to spread international good will and friendliness than Smoky", calling him "the only inhabitant of the village who spoke every language. He used the universal sign language — just wagged his tail."

== See also ==
- List of individual dogs
