= Neve, Gliz, and Aster =

Official mascots of the 2006 Winter Olympics and Paralympics in Turin

Neve and Gliz

Mascots of the 2006 Winter Olympics (Turin)
- Creator: Pedro Albuquerque
- Significance: Snow and Ice

Aster

Mascots of the 2006 Winter Paralympics (Turin)
- Creator: Pedro Albuquerque
- Significance: Snowflake

Neve and Gliz were the official mascots of the 2006 Winter Olympics and Aster was the official mascot of the 2006 Winter Paralympics, both held in Turin, Italy.

Neve and Gliz were created by Pedro Albuquerque. They both represent the characteristics of the Winter Games, including "Snow and Ice". Neve ("Snow" in Italian) is a humanized female snowball that wears red and represents "softness, friendship and elegance." Gliz (a shortened form of Ghiaccio, "Ice" in Italian) is a humanized male ice cube who wears blue and represents "enthusiasm and joy."

For the election of the official mascots of the 2006 Winter Olympics, the Organizing Committee of the Winter Games (TOROC) conducted a contest to which 237 proposals were submitted before closure of the nominations on May 20, 2003. Of these candidates, five came to the final round in which they were evaluated by an international jury selected by TOROC. The election was subsequently ratified by the Presidential Committee of TOROC. Finally, the winners, Albuquerque's "Neve and Gliz," were submitted on September 28, 2004, exactly 500 days before the opening of the Olympics.

== Paralympic mascot ==
Aster is the official mascot of the Torino 2006 Paralympic Winter Games, which was introduced by the Torino 2006 Organizing Committee in March 2005. The mascot is a snowflake, with blue and white colors, welcoming fans and athletes from all around the world. Aster represents a unique way an athlete can participate in a sport, and his name originates from the Latin word ‘’star’’.

Preceded by Athena and Phevos	Olympic mascot Neve and Gliz; Torino 2006	Succeeded by The Fuwa
Preceded by Proteas	Paralympic mascot Aster; Torino 2006	Succeeded by Fu Niu Lele
