= Takuchan =

Unofficial mascot of the 1972 Winter Olympics in Sapporo

Unofficial mascot of the 1972 Winter Olympics (Sapporo)
- Creator: Seiko design department
- Significance: An Asian black bear

Takuchan (Japanese: たくちゃん) was the unofficial mascot of the 1972 Winter Olympics held in Sapporo, Japan. An Asian black bear, Takuchan was designed by Seiko, one of the official sponsors of the Games.

Takuchan was marketed by Seiko exclusively in connection with the Games and in combination with the official emblem, with fabric figures, decals, bags, bath towels and many other souvenirs of Takuchan being sold. Another sponsor, Takushoku Bank, released a series of Takuchan-themed money banks, which depicted Takuchan performing several Winter Olympic sports, and which circulated widely as quasi-totems. Pictograms of Takuchan performing Winter Olympic sports were also created, which are the first known Olympic mascot pictograms.
