= Lele (mascot) =

Mascot of the 2014 Summer Youth Olympics in Nanjing

Mascot of the 2014 Summer Youth Olympics (Nanjing)
- Significance: Yuhua stones

Lele (Chinese: 砳砳), also known as Nanjing Lele, is the official mascot of the Nanjing 2014 Summer Youth Olympics. After a competition, the stone was chosen to represent the games. The word ‘lele’ represents the sound of stones colliding together and is pronounced like the Chinese word meaning happiness or joy. The mascot was revealed to the public by Chinese Olympic champions Sun Yang, Huang Xu and Wu Jingyu.

== Characteristics ==
Lele is based on Yuhua stones, which come in the colors of red, pink, yellow, white and green. It is short and robust with bulging eyes, always wearing a smile.

Birthplace	Nanjing
Birthday	29 November
Chinese Zodiac	Dragon
Zodiac Sign	Sagittarius
Blood type	O
Appearance	Colorful, non-mainstream aesthetic
Personality	Cute, cuddly, curious, frisky, enthusiastic, brave, and a little rebellious
Tag	Hello, I'm NANJINGLELE
Hobbies	Being a tour guide of Nanjing, taking pictures with friends from around the world and eating marshmallows
Talents	The 28 disciplines of the Youth Olympic Games
Tongue twister	si shi si; shi shi shi; si shi shi lele; lele bu nene
Favourite thing to do	Being with friends
Things disliked most	Playing alone
The most unbearable thing	Seeing friends being bullied
The most enjoyable thing	Drinking a glass of water after competition and being full of positive energy
Not good at	Singing, dancing
Favourite foods	Salted duck, sweet-scented osmanthus duck, plum flower cake, Pidu noodles, spiced beans, duck blood and vermicelli soup, Jinling steamed dumplings
Favourite color	Every color found in a rainbow
Favourite flower	Rain flower
Favourite fairy tale	The Ugly Duckling
Favourite place	Competition venues of the Youth Olympic Games
Famous for	Mascot promotional video for Nanjing 2014

Preceded by Yoggl	Olympic mascot Lele; Nanjing 2014	Succeeded by Sjogg
