= Miraitowa and Someity =

2020 Olympic and Paralympic mascots

Miraitowa (left), the mascot of the 2020 Summer Olympics, and Someity (right), the mascot of the 2020 Summer Paralympics. Both mascots were designed by Ryo Taniguchi (Japanese: 谷口亮).

Miraitowa (Japanese: ミライトワ) is the official mascot of the 2020 Summer Olympics, and Someity (Japanese: ソメイティ) is the official mascot of the 2020 Summer Paralympics. The events were held in Tokyo, Japan, in 2021. (Note: Originally scheduled to take place between 24 July and 9 August 2020, the 2020 Summer Olympics were rescheduled for 23 July to 8 August 2021 as a result of the COVID-19 pandemic. The Games kept the name "Tokyo 2020" for marketing and branding purposes despite being held in 2021.) The checkered design on both mascots was inspired by the Tokyo 2020 official logo, which uses a checkered pattern called ichimatsu moyo that was popular during the Edo period. Someity's pink design was inspired by cherry blossoms. Both fictional characters have various superpowers, such as teleportation.

Created by Japanese artist Ryo Taniguchi (Japanese: 谷口亮), the mascots were selected from a design competition organized by the Tokyo 2020 Organising Committee in late 2017 and early 2018. A total of 2,042 candidate designs were submitted to the committee, which then selected three pairs of unnamed mascot designs from the batch to present to Japanese elementary school students for the final decision. The results of the selection were announced on 28 February 2018, and the mascots were named on 22 July 2018. Miraitowa is named after the Japanese words for "future" (未来, mirai) and "eternity" (永久, towa), and Someity is named after someiyoshino (ソメイヨシノ), a type of cherry blossom. Someity's name also echoes the English phrase "so mighty". The mascots helped finance the Tokyo Games through merchandising and licensing deals.

== History ==
=== Selection and naming process ===
In late 2017 and early 2018, the Tokyo 2020 Organising Committee held a competition to determine the design of the 2020 mascots. A total of 2,042 design submissions were accepted between 1 August and 14 August 2017. The entries were then subjected to a series of format and design examinations led by media specialists and the Organising Committee's Mascot Selection Panel to determine whether they "would appeal to elementary school-aged children" and whether they "amply reflected the spirit of the Tokyo 2020 Games Vision". Yoshiko Ikoma, the deputy chief of the Mascot Selection Panel, described this initial mascot selection process as "heated", commenting that mascot selection committee members had diverging opinions on how to select the shortlist of mascots to present to the schoolchildren.

By mid-October 2017, this process reduced the pool to a shortlist of three sets of mascot candidates, which were unveiled on 7 December 2017. Each set included two mascots: one for the Olympic Games and the other for the Paralympic Games. Between 11 December 2017 and 22 February 2018, an election was conducted across 16,769 Japanese elementary schools to choose the winning entry, with each participating elementary school class allocated one vote. In total, 205,755 elementary school classes participated in the election, which was about 75% of elementary schools in Japan.

Results of the mascot selection
Pair	Designer	Votes received	Appearance	Profile
A (winner)	Ryo Taniguchi (Japanese: 谷口亮)	109,041	(see top of article)	
B	Kana Yano (Japanese: 矢野花奈)	61,423		
C	Sanae Akimoto (Japanese: 秋本早苗)	35,291		

The chosen mascots were announced without names on 28 February 2018. The winning entry was candidate pair A, created by Ryo Taniguchi. The Mascot Selection Panel held a vote on a shortlist of proposed names on 28 May 2018, and names with the most votes were subjected to a trademark verification process before they became official. The names of the mascots, Miraitowa and Someity, were announced when the mascots made their formal debut at a press event on 22 July 2018.

== Characteristics ==
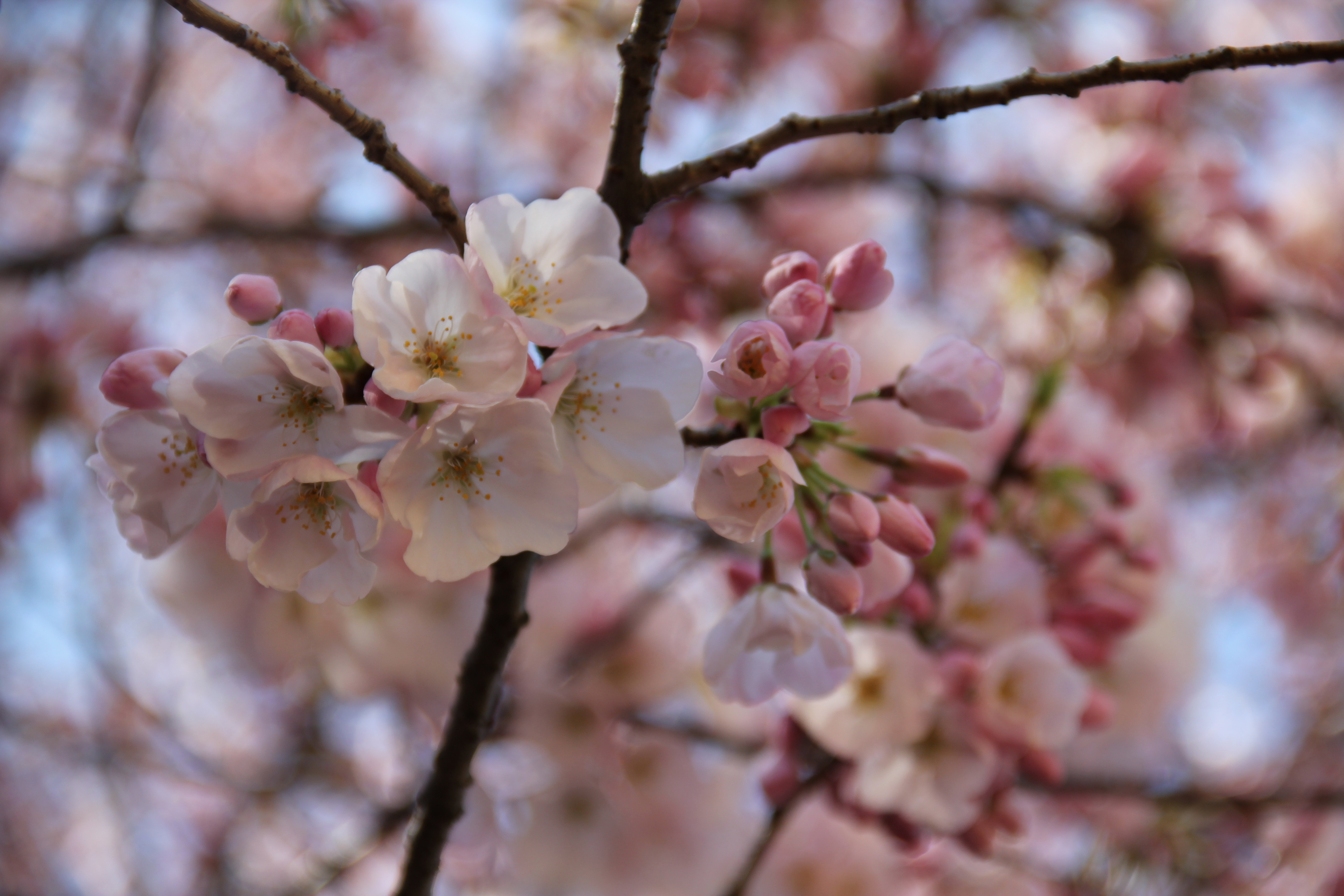
Flowers of the cherry blossom Prunus × yedoensis (Japanese: 染井吉野, romanized: someiyoshino), the namesake of the Paralympic mascot

Miraitowa, the Olympic mascot, is a figure with blue-checkered patterns inspired by the Games' official logo, which uses a similar checkered pattern called ichimatsu moyo that was popular during the Edo period in Japan from 1603 to 1867. Miraitowa is intended to embody "both old tradition and new innovation". The character has a "strong sense of justice" and is described as "very athletic". It has the ability to teleport anywhere instantly. Miraitowa's name is a combination of the Japanese words "future" (未来, mirai) and "eternity" (永久, towa). According to the Tokyo 2020 organizers, the name "was chosen to promote a future full of eternal hope in the hearts of people all over the world".

Someity, the Paralympic mascot, is a figure with pink-checkered patterns inspired by cherry blossoms as well as the Games' official logo. The character is described as "usually calm" but can become "very powerful when needed". Someity can fly using its checkered cape and send telepathic messages using its cherry blossom-shaped antennae. It can also "talk to stones and the wind" and move objects by looking at them. Someity is named after someiyoshino, a type of cherry blossom, and its name is also intended to refer to the English phrase "so mighty".

Although the two mascots have conflicting personalities, they nonetheless have a strong friendship and respect for each other. According to their fictional backgrounds, Miraitowa and Someity "live in the digital world", and through the Internet, they can transport themselves between the digital world and the real world. According to Sadashige Aoki, an advertising theory professor at Hosei University, the mascots follow a Japanese tradition of "creating personalized characters out of nature — mountains, rivers, animals and plants", as well as a "tradition of animism, a belief that every natural thing has a soul".

== Artist ==
The mascots were designed by Japanese artist Ryo Taniguchi, who lives in the Fukuoka Prefecture in southern Japan. Taniguchi was persuaded by his father, who is also an illustrator, to study art at Cabrillo College in California. Taniguchi began his art career selling postcard illustrations on the streets of Fukuoka for ¥150 each. Later, he helped illustrate English-language textbooks for Japanese children.

Taniguchi discovered the Tokyo 2020 mascot competition on Facebook in February 2017 and came up with the idea of creating a character whose head resembled a samurai war helmet with the ichimatsu moyo pattern of the official Tokyo 2020 logo. After making a rough sketch, Taniguchi reworked the design after the competition's official application requirements were announced in May 2017. In designing the mascots, Taniguchi focused on the mascots' eyes to make his proposal stand out.

Taniguchi was uninvolved in the naming of the mascots, though he did attend a screening at which various naming proposals were introduced. As part of the agreement to use the mascots, Taniguchi transferred intellectual property rights to the mascots to the Olympic and Paralympic committees, and as a result, he will not receive any royalty payments from mascot-related licensing.

== Media ==
=== Merchandise and marketing ===
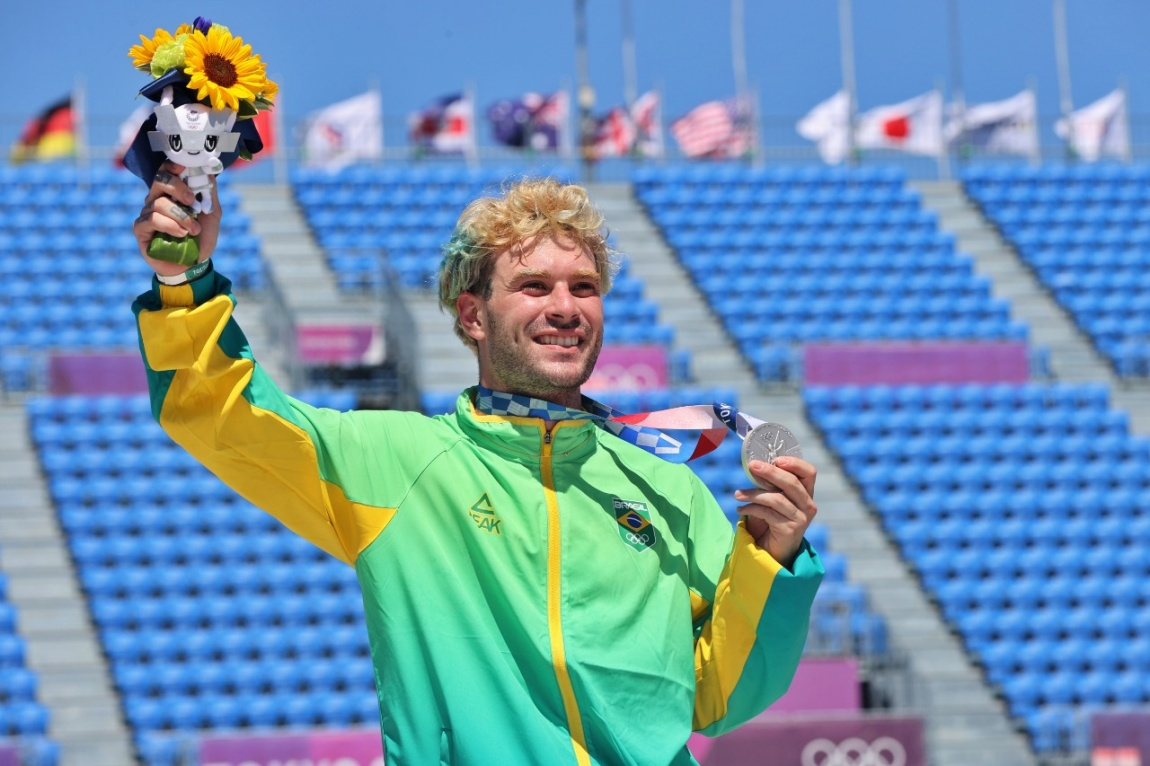
Brazilian skateboarder Pedro Barros holds up a bouquet with a silver-colored plush doll of Miraitowa after winning silver in the men's park skateboarding event

Olympic officials expected the mascots to generate approximately $130 million (¥14.4 billion) in revenue from licensing and merchandising to help finance the Tokyo Games. Organizers of Tokyo 2020 had been criticized for budget management; according to Reuters, a 2016 study found that overall expenses for the Olympics "could balloon to four times the initial estimate made in the bid process." Tokyo 2020 was required to transfer the intellectual property rights of the mascots to the International Olympic Committee and the International Paralympic Committee after the conclusion of the Games, preventing the city from developing and profiting from the mascots afterward.

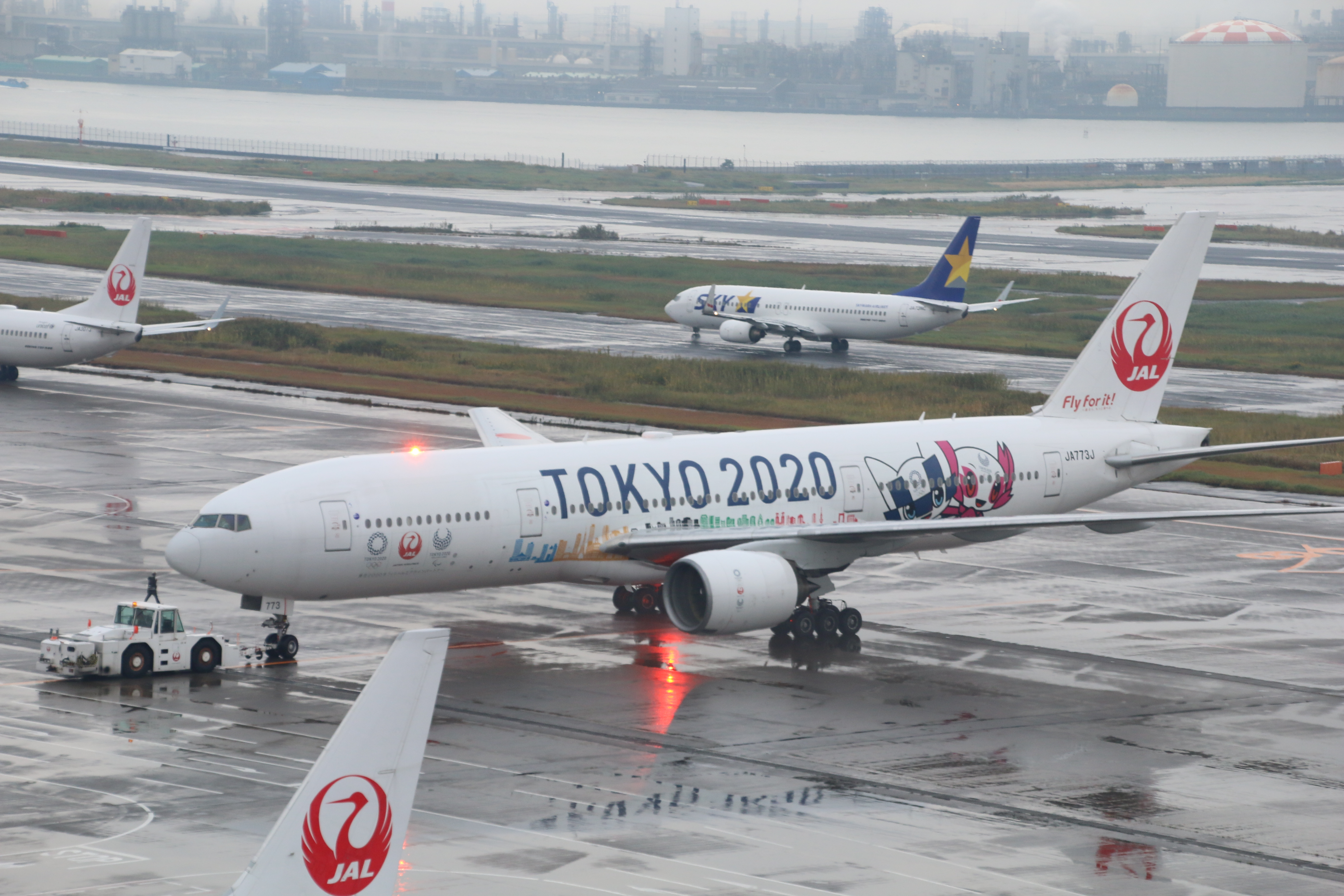
JA773J, the Japan Airlines Boeing 777-200 painted with the special Tokyo 2020 livery featuring Miraitowa and Someity, photographed at Haneda Airport in 2020

From late July to early September 2018, a "Mascot House" was located on the first floor of the Tokyo Midtown Hibiya building, in which visitors could take photos with the mascots and purchase licensed merchandise featuring the mascots. In April 2019, Japan Airlines announced a special livery commemorating Tokyo 2020, featuring Miraitowa and Someity. It was painted first on a Boeing 777-200 airplane, then later on a Boeing 767-300ER. On 11 July 2019, Tokyo 2020 organizers unveiled new merchandise, some of it featuring the mascots, which was able to be purchased either online or through authorized vendors throughout Japan. On 22 July 2019, the official Japanese Twitter account of Tokyo 2020 posted an animated short depicting Miraitowa participating in all the sports to be contested at the Games. On 25 August 2019, the same Twitter account posted a similar animated video featuring Someity participating in the Paralympic Games. In late 2019, the Japanese Ministry of Finance issued special coins commemorating the 2020 Summer Olympics, with two of the 100 yen coin designs featuring Miraitowa and Someity.

Plush dolls of Miraitowa and Someity were attached to the bouquets given to Olympic and Paralympic medalists at Tokyo 2020, with their "armor" in the color of the athlete's medal, as part of their design by the Nippon Flower Council. The bouquet features flowers from areas affected by the 2011 Tōhoku earthquake and tsunami to highlight that region's recovery from the natural disaster.

=== Robotics ===
On 22 July 2019, the organizers of the 2020 Summer Olympics announced that robotic automatons of Miraitowa and Someity, among other robots, were expected to be included during the Games. According to the Los Angeles Times, the robots are "programmed to show facial expressions as they wave at and shake hands with athletes and fans". The Tokyo 2020 organizing committee plans to use the mascots primarily to promote the Games and greet visitors and athletes, attempting to increase engagement with children. The robots were also featured as part of a "1 Year to Go" press event on 22 July 2019 at an Olympic venue in Tokyo. The robots were included as part of another press event on 18 November 2019 at a Japanese elementary school. The robots' eyes can change to display hearts, along with other emotions, and their multiple joints and arms can be remotely controlled. Cameras allow the robots to recognize and respond to facial expressions. The robots were developed in collaboration with Toyota.

== Reception ==
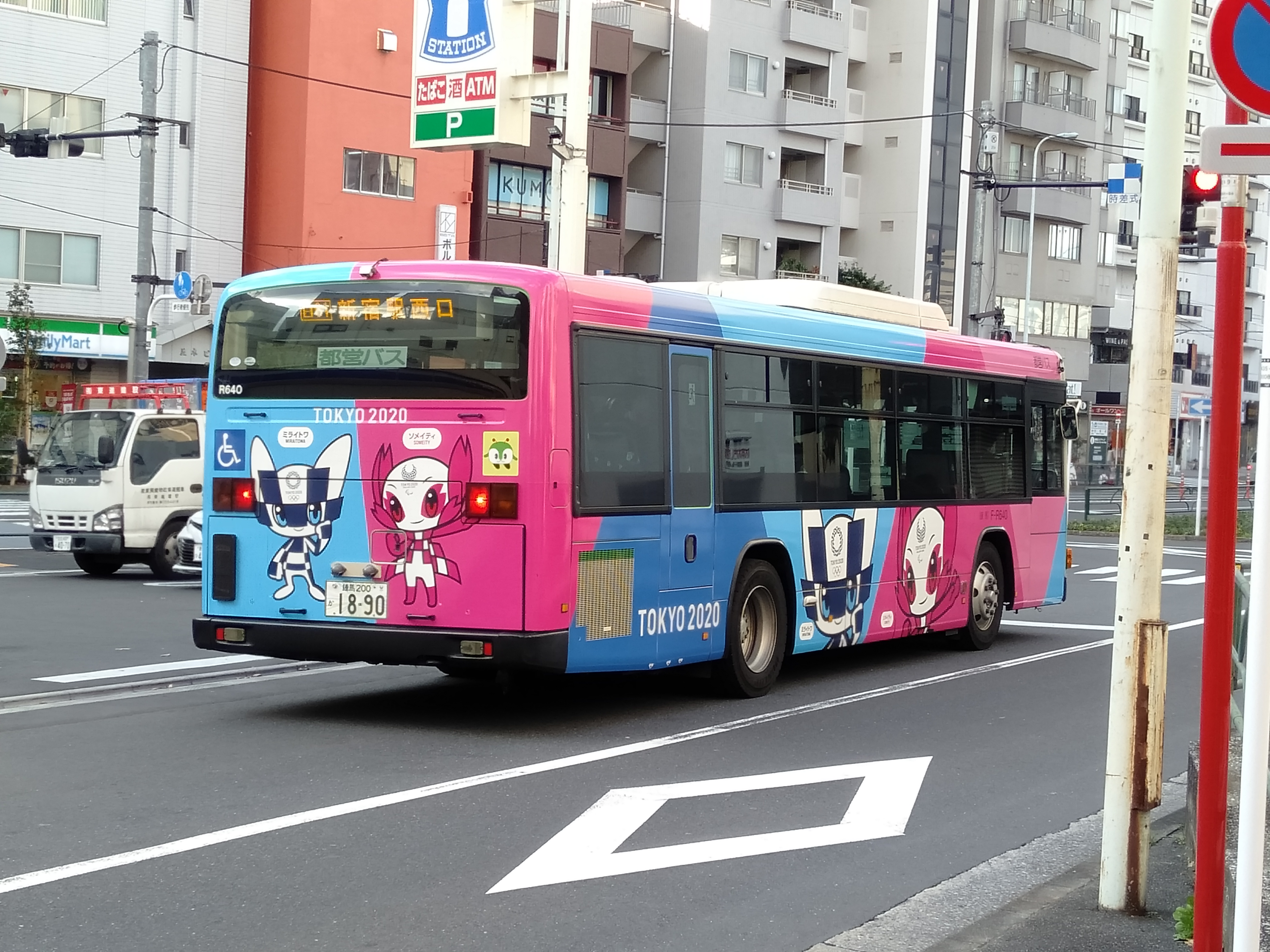
Miraitowa and Someity on a Toei Bus in Tokyo in 2019

An article by Agence France-Presse described the social media reaction to the mascot selection on as "mixed". Some users commented that the mascots were "very Japanese and very cute", while others commented that the mascots should have been "more round" or "more huggable". Other commentators said that the selected design "appealed more to children whereas adults preferred the softer and more traditional options". Multiple observers compared the design of the mascots to that of the Pokémon franchise.

Dan McQuade wrote in an article in sports news website Deadspin that it would be difficult for Miraitowa and Someity to match the popularity of Soohorang and Bandabi, the mascots of the 2018 Winter Olympics, citing statements from the BBC, which wrote that the 2020 mascots "have a tough act to follow", and The Japan Times, which wrote in a headline that the success of Soohorang and Bandabi "leaves Japan in a bind". A student who was interviewed at the school where the mascot selection was revealed said she was "very happy" about the outcome and described the mascots as "futuristic". Upon learning that his mascot design was the winning candidate, Ryo Taniguchi stated, "Thank you very much, my mind has gone blank and I don't know what to say ... I can't wait to tell my darling wife."

In an article published in The New York Times on 27 July 2021, Mike Ives and Hikari Hida commented that, despite the typical importance of mascots in Japanese advertising, the mascots have had a "subdued" presence at the Tokyo Olympics, commenting that "the Japanese public is not swooning over them either, according to fans and experts who study the country's mascot industry". Ives and Hida described a common complaint being that the names of the mascots, Miraitowa and Someity, are difficult to remember. The article quoted a mother named Yuki Fuka, who commented, "Within the whirlwind of all the Olympic controversy, I think the mascots were forgotten somewhere along the way [...] The Games have just started and their existence is already an afterthought." According to Jillian Rae Suter, a professor of informatics at Shizuoka University, "They're not hated, design-wise. They seem to be functional. They seem to be doing a good job [...] But there doesn't seem to be a lot of passion for them." Because Miraitowa and Someity did not appear during the 2020 Summer Olympics opening ceremony, a social media user named Suekichiii tweeted a popular picture depicting them watching the ceremony from home.

== Notes ==
Preceded by Soohorang	Olympic mascot Miraitowa; Tokyo 2020	Succeeded by Bing Dwen Dwen
Preceded by Bandabi	Paralympic mascot Someity; Tokyo 2020	Succeeded by Shuey Rhon Rhon
