= Bing Dwen Dwen and Shuey Rhon Rhon =

2022 Winter Olympics and Paralympics mascots

- Simplified Chinese: 冰墩墩和雪容融
Transcriptions
Standard Mandarin
- Hanyu Pinyin: Bīng Dūn Dūn hé Xuě Róng Róng
Yue: Cantonese
- Jyutping: bing1 dan1 dan1 wo4 syut3 jung4 jung4

Bing Dwen Dwen (left), the mascot of the Olympics, and Shuey Rhon Rhon (right), the mascot of the Paralympics. Both mascots were designed by Cao Xue (Chinese: 曹雪) and Jiang Yufan (Chinese: 姜宇帆)

Bing Dwen Dwen (Chinese: 冰墩墩; pinyin: Bīng Dūn Dūn) is the official mascot of the 2022 Winter Olympics, and Shuey Rhon Rhon (Chinese: 雪容融; pinyin: Xuě Róng Róng) is the official mascot of the 2022 Winter Paralympics. The name of Bing Dwen Dwen possibly means ice hulu, as 墩 (Dūn) in its name is a homophone of 礅 (Dūn) in the word 糖礅 in Tianjin dialect, meaning tanghulu, the prototype of the mascot. Both events were held in Beijing, the capital of China.

== History ==
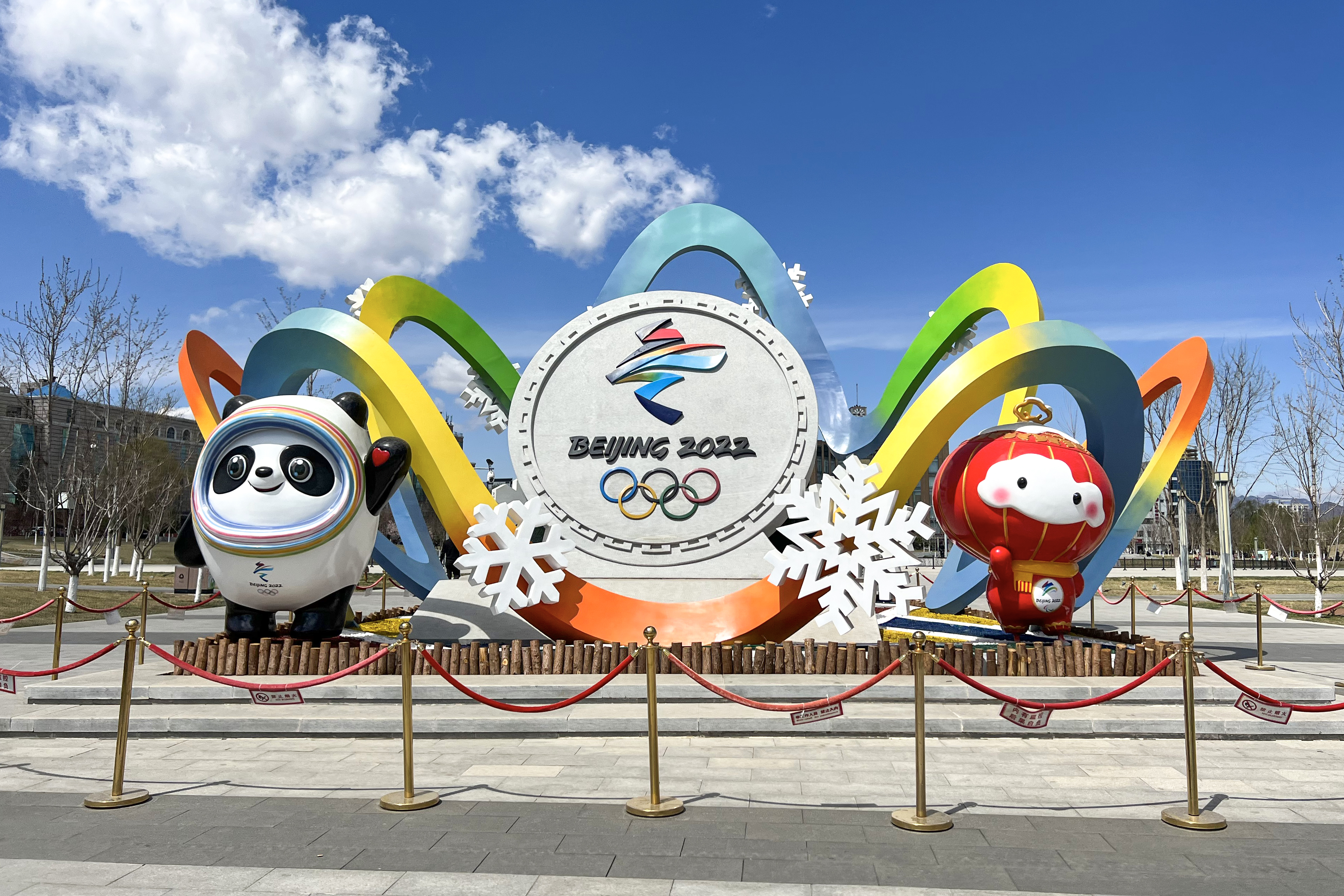
Statues of the mascots at Guichuan Square in Yanqing, Beijing

The mascot design competition was launched on 8 August 2018. A total of 5,816 designs were submitted for further review and ten were shortlisted. The mascots were unveiled on 17 September 2019. Bing Dwen Dwen and Shuey Rhon Rhon were selected over eight other designs.

During the Olympic games, medalists were given a stuffed version of Bing Dwen Dwen at a ceremony immediately after the conclusion of their event, while medals were awarded at a later ceremony combining winners from multiple events.

Some critics of the Chinese government say that China has used social media bots and fake accounts to promote the mascot with Chinese media pointing to this inauthentic activity as evidence of the mascot's popularity.

== Characteristics ==
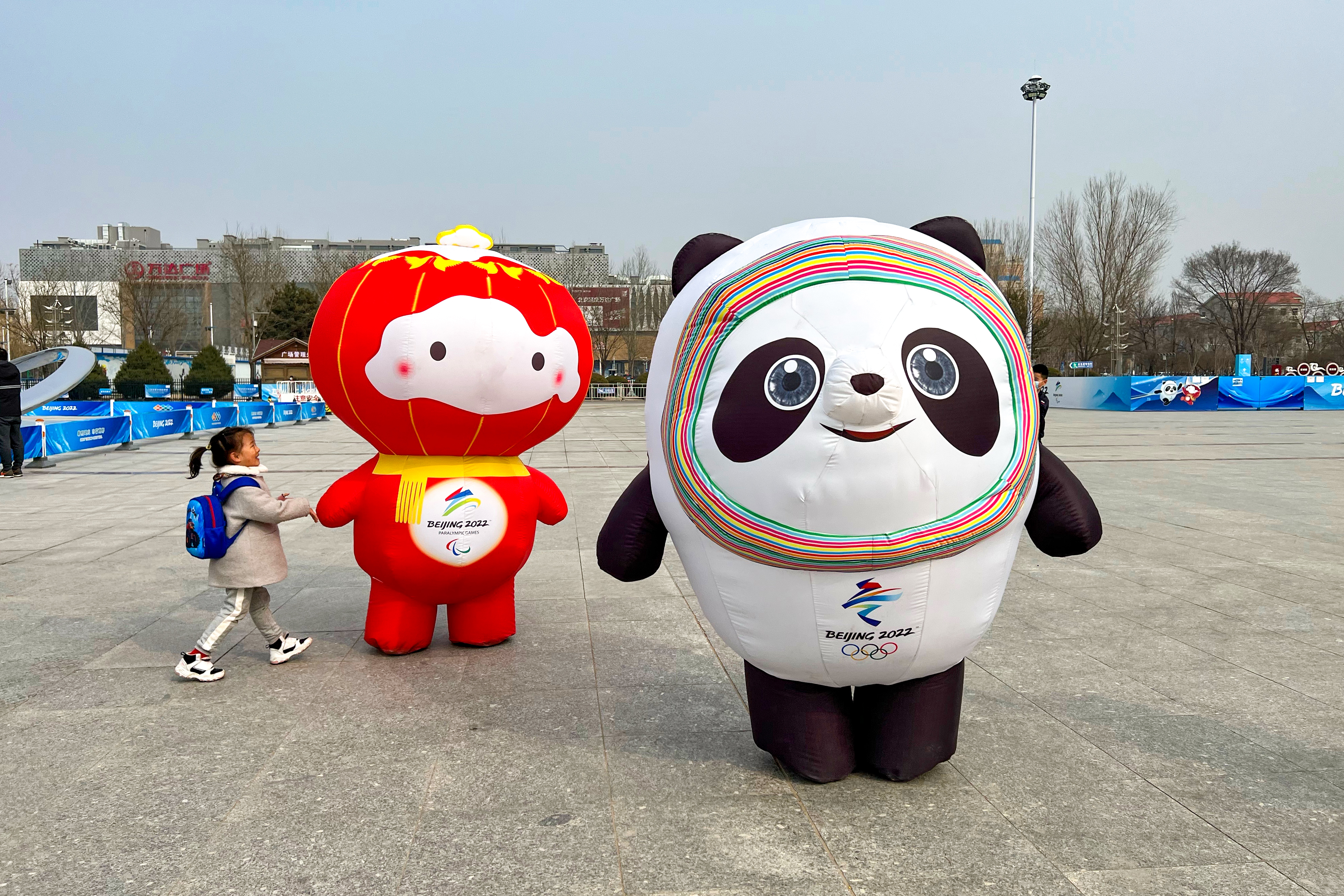
Volunteers dressed in costumes of the two mascots at the 2022 Winter Olympics

Bing Dwen Dwen is a giant panda plush mascot wearing a full-body transparent shell made of ice that resembles an astronaut's spacesuit. Designed in theme with the Winter Olympics, its features carry symbolic meaning, portraying the spirit of the sports. "Bing", which means ice, together with "Dwen Dwen", which means health, liveliness and cuteness, conform to the overall image of pandas in the wintery theme. The colorful ring around Bing Dwen Dwen's face is inspired by the "ice ribbon" of the national speed skating hall of the Beijing Winter Olympics. It has a heart on its left palm, meant to symbolise China's hospitality for athletes and spectators at the Winter Olympics. Some netizens believe Bing Dwen Dwen's design may have also been inspired by the traditional Chinese winter treat tanghulu (糖葫芦) as the suit of ice resembles the clear candy coating.

Shuey Rhon Rhon is an anthropomorphic Chinese lantern. Lanterns represent harvest, celebration, warmth and light. The wishful shape at the top symbolizes auspicious happiness. The continuous pattern of the dove of peace and the Temple of Heaven symbolize the peaceful friendship and highlights the characteristics of the place where the events are held. The decorative pattern incorporates the traditional Chinese paper-cutting art. The snow on the face represents the meaning of "a fall of seasonable snow gives promise of a fruitful year" (瑞雪兆丰年). It also reflects the anthropomorphic design and highlights the mascot's cuteness. The mascot’s color is red since red is the most festive color of the country aligning with the Chinese New Year celebrations in February and March 2022, the first ‘’Rhon’’ in the mascot’s name means ‘’to include, to tolerate’’, while the second Rhon stand for ‘’to melt, to fuse’’. The name symbolizes the idea to foster more inclusion for people with impairments, as well as connection between cultures and countries.

Bing Dwen Dwen is the main Olympic mascot. Shuey Rhon Rhon is the Paralympic mascot.

== Artists ==
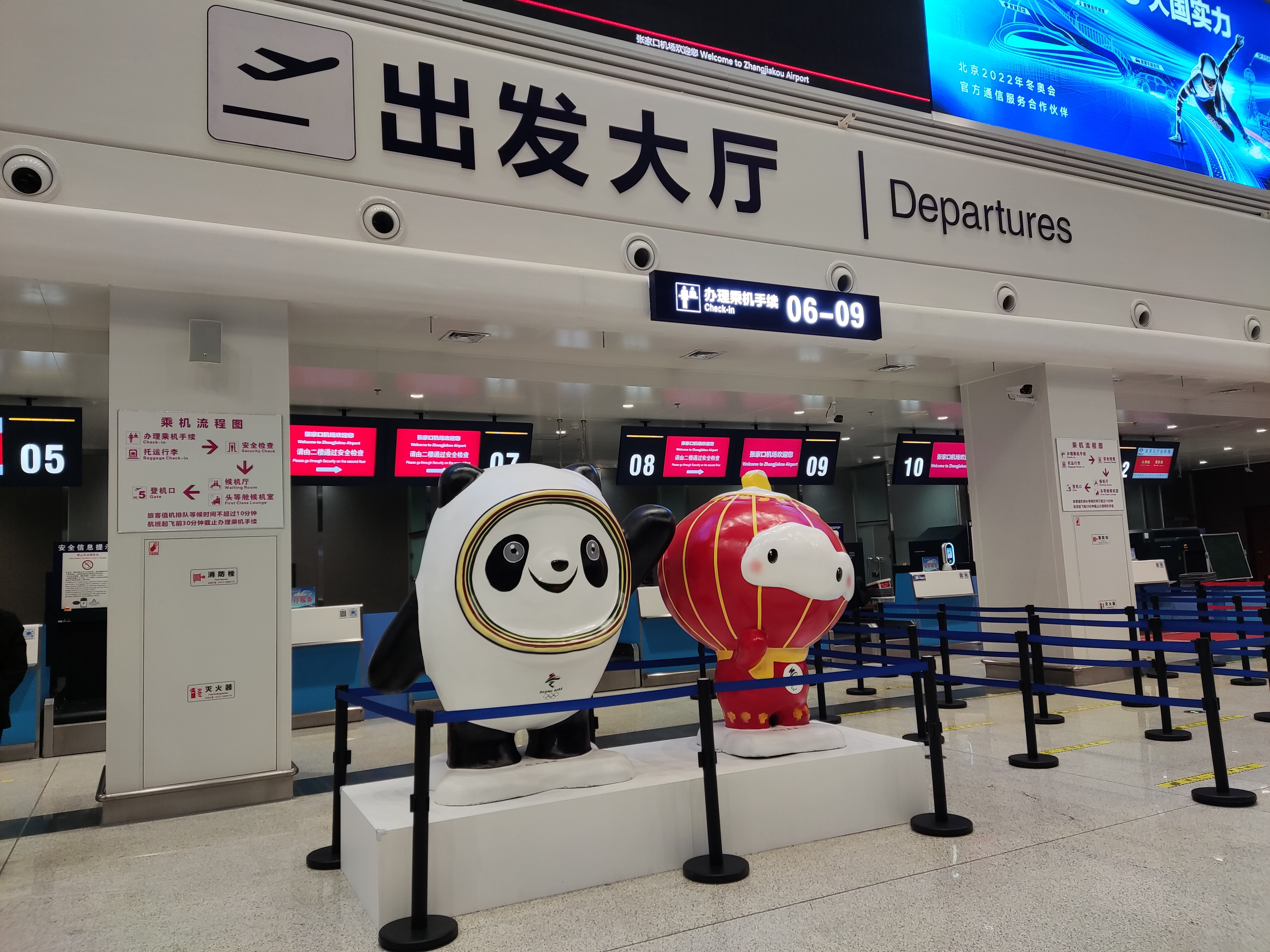
Statues of the two mascots at the Zhangjiakou Ningyuan Airport

Bing Dwen Dwen was designed by Cao Xue (曹雪), a chief designer at Guangzhou Academy of Fine Arts. Cao Xue stated that during the months leading up to the games, he and his design team designing and modifying the mascot and once gave up the idea of a panda mascot due to its prevalence. He also expressed his surprise that the demand for the mascot was so high.

Shuey Rhon Rhon was designed by Jiang Yufan (姜玉凡), an undergraduate majoring in product design at the Jilin Art Institute of Design. Jiang Yufan first submitted mascot designs based on a deer, and a combination of a Chinese knot and a dumpling, but after suggestions from her professors she altered the design to be a combination of a Chinese knot and a red lantern.

== Media ==
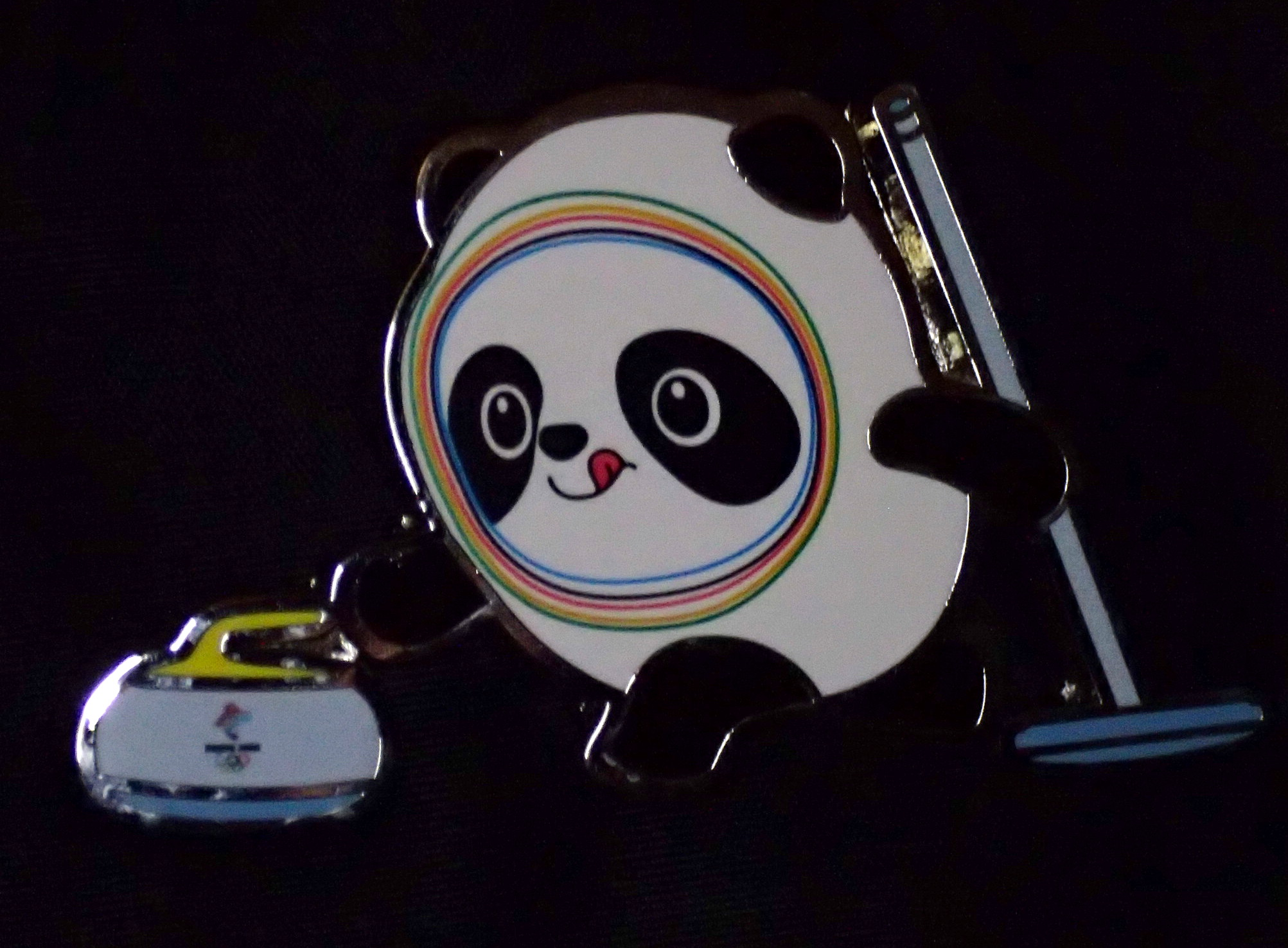
A Bing Dwen Dwen pin

=== Merchandising ===
Stuffed toys of Bing Dwen Dwen have become a very popular souvenir, with stores regularly selling out and people lining up for hours outside stores, sometimes overnight, to purchase them. Scalpers have also been seen purchasing Bing Dwen Dwen merchandise and reselling it for higher prices.

=== NFTs ===
It was announced on 10 February that 500 epic boxes that would include multiple designs of Bing Dwen Dwen would go on sale the next day via nWayPlay. Each box would be priced at $99, with a maximum of five per purchase and would include three officially licensed digital pins with approved mascot art featuring different winter sports, the official emblem and a poster. Due to their popularity a second round of officially licensed NFTs were announced 17 February, the 200 legendary boxes would be priced at $349, with only one box per purchase. Each legendary box would include a work of art and two pincs.

== Reception ==
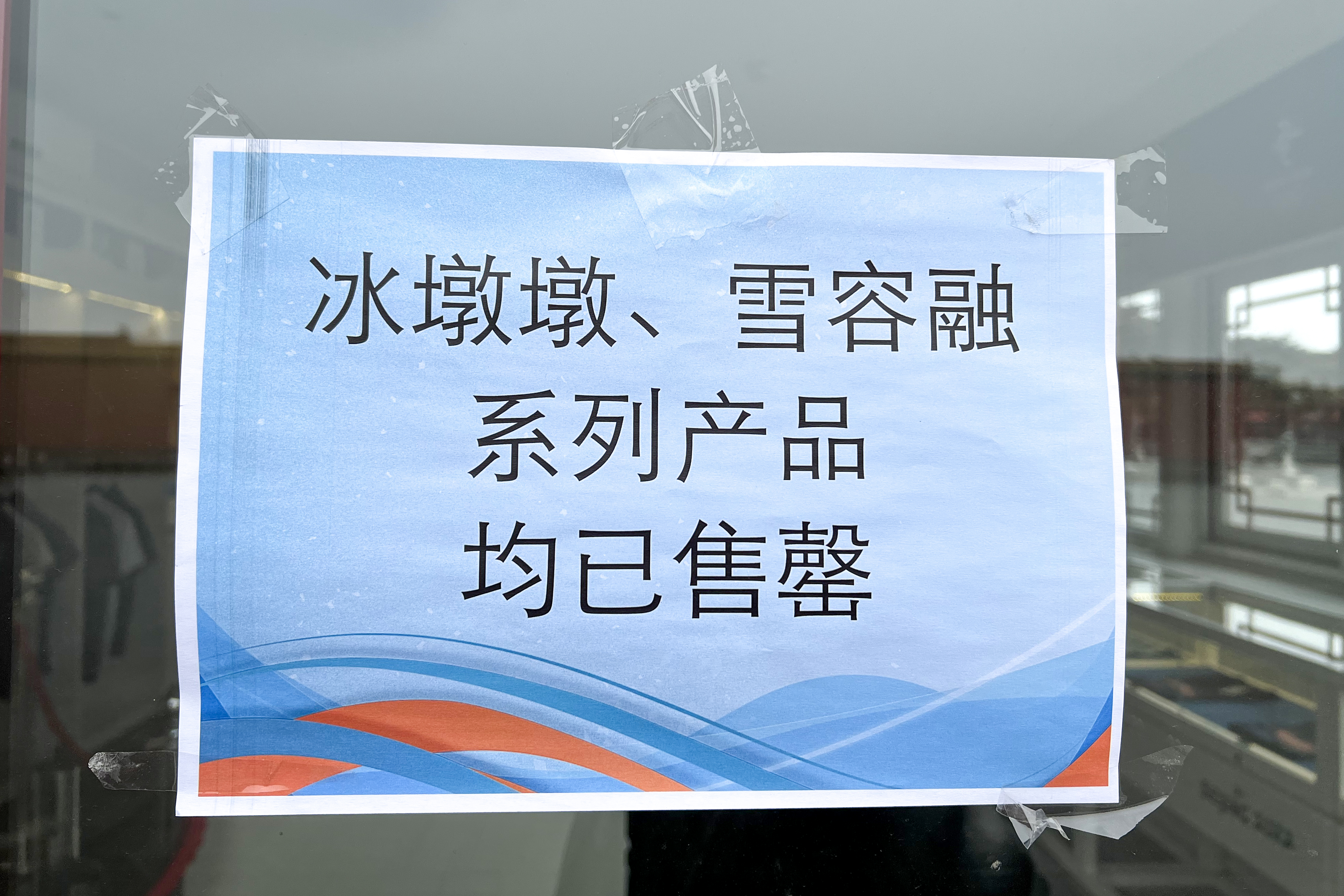
A sign outside a shop in Beijing informing customers that their stock of mascots have sold out

Stuffed versions of Bing Dwen Dwen become a very popular souvenir, with stores regularly selling out and people lining up for hours outside stores, sometimes overnight, to purchase them.

Fans of Bing Dwen Dwen expressed outrage over a 8 February interview aired on CCTV where a reporter wore a Bing Dwen Dwen costume to interview athlete Yang Shuorui. Many claimed they would no longer purchase merchandise after the interview as they "don't want to hear the 'uncle' voice of the Bing Dwen Dwen. It's just a little cute panda." The interview video was quickly pulled.

Preceded by Miraitowa	Olympic mascot Bing Dwen Dwen; Beijing 2022	Succeeded by The Olympic Phryge
Preceded by Someity	Paralympic mascot Shuey Rhon Rhon; Beijing 2022	Succeeded by The Paralympic Phryge
