= Meomi Design =

Canadian creative duo and design studio

- Abbreviation: Meomi
- Formation: 2002
- Founders: Vicki Wong; Michael C. Murphy
- Type: Creative duo and design studio
- Headquarters: Vancouver, British Columbia, Canada
- Website: www.meomi.com

Meomi Design Inc. (commonly known as Meomi) is a Vancouver-based Canadian creative duo and design studio founded in 2002 by Vicki Wong and Michael C. Murphy. Meomi is known for creating The Octonauts children's book series (later adapted for television) and for designing the official mascots for the Vancouver 2010 Olympic and Paralympic Winter Games.

== History ==
Wong, from Vancouver, British Columbia, and Murphy, from Milford, Michigan, began collaborating after connecting online in 2000 and formed Meomi Design in 2002. Wong and Murphy have produced work for clients including Google, Canon, Microsoft, Yo Gabba Gabba!, and the Monterey Bay Aquarium.

== The Octonauts ==
=== Children's books ===
The Octonauts began in 2004 as monthly desktop wallpaper calendars on Meomi's website. The series follows a crew of animal explorers who undertake missions under the sea.

In 2005, Meomi was approached to develop a picture book based on the characters, and The Octonauts and the Only Lonely Monster was published in 2006.

Six picture books were published in the series from 2006 to 2014:

- The Octonauts and the Only Lonely Monster (2006)
- The Octonauts and the Sea of Shade (2007)
- The Octonauts and the Frown Fish (2008)
- The Octonauts and the Great Ghost Reef (2009)
- The Octonauts Explore the Great Big Ocean (2012)
- The Octonauts and the Growing Goldfish (2014)

Meomi later published Octonauts activity books, including The Octonauts Color the Ocean! (2023) and The Octonauts ABC Under the Sea! (2024).

=== Animated television series ===
In 2010, Octonauts was adapted from Meomi's book series as a CGI-animated television series for the BBC's CBeebies channel, premiering on 4 October 2010. The series has been broadcast in more than 100 countries worldwide.

Wong and Murphy are credited as co-executive producers on the television series. Meomi also contributed illustration, design, and motion-graphics animation, including Kwazii's fantasy sequences and on-screen computer graphics used in the series to present sea-creature information. Murphy is credited as the voice of Tunip and the Vegimals in the original series.

== Vancouver 2010 Olympic and Paralympic mascots ==
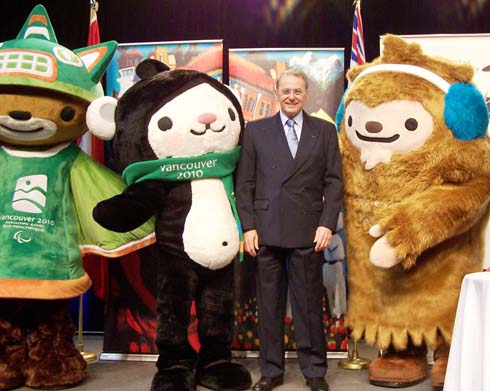
Meomi designed the official mascots for the 2010 Winter Olympics and 2010 Winter Paralympics.

Meomi designed Miga and Quatchi (the Olympic mascots) and Sumi (the Paralympic mascot) for the Vancouver 2010 Winter Games, along with Mukmuk, their designated sidekick. The International Olympic Committee notes that VANOC issued a tender to illustration agencies and professionals, receiving 177 responses before selecting Meomi.

The mascots were inspired by British Columbia wildlife and First Nations stories. Mukmuk was based on the Vancouver Island marmot, an endangered species.

Meomi also authored the bilingual picture book Miga, Quatchi and/et Sumi: The Story of the Vancouver 2010 Mascots (Whitecap Books, 2007), published in both English and French.
