= Jozef Szekeres =

Australian artist

Jozef Szekeres (born 4 July 1970) is an Australian artist, animator, writer, toy designer, sculptor, creative director, arts lecturer, and a director of the Black Mermaid Productions creative team based in Australia. He is best known for his doll creation Elizabet Bizelle, launched through his company Jozef Szekeres Dolls in 2003. He was a finalist in the 2011 Australian Cartoonist Association Stanley Awards, with nominations for Best Australian Illustrator and Australian Comic Book Artist.

He co-created and illustrated the comic book series ElfQuest – WaveDancers and Elf-Fin: Hyfus & Tilaweed.

== Early life ==
Szekeres was born in Blacktown, Sydney, and grew up near Gosford on the Central Coast of New South Wales, graduating in 1988 from the Central Coast Grammar School in Erina, Central Coast. He attended the Sydney Conservatorium of Music in the Music Composition School but did not graduate.

In 1989, he moved to the Sydney central business district to work at the Walt Disney Animation Australia Studio, now known as DisneyToon Studios, and was the youngest animator employed there at that time.

== Career ==
As a freelance animator and Animation Director, he created television commercials for both Australian and international markets, most notably Finlandia Vodka Pulp, Mr Sheen, Strongbow Cider Cyborg and Blowtorch, Cafe with Billy for Nescafe, The Fifth Finger for KitKat, and FantasticRiceCrackers for Fantastic.

=== Comic books ===
In 1993, Szekeres illustrated the comic book series ElfQuest – WaveDancers, which he co-created with Julie Ditrich and Bruce Love.

In 1999, Szekeres worked with Joseph Michael Linsner, creating character designs for Dreams of Dawn Wizard #1/2, and Dawn: Return of the Goddess #3, published by Sirius Entertainment.

In 2011, Szekeres again worked with Julie Ditrich on Elf-Fin: Hyfus & Tilaweed.

=== Illustration ===
Szekeres's illustration works have been featured in Stripped Uncensored and Completely Stripped published in 2009 and 2010 respectively (in Germany) by Bruno Gmünder.

Szekeres also created illustrations for the 2007 Sydney Mardi Gras, and 2008 Sleaze Ball (which is also part of the Sydney Mardi Gras). For the 2008 Sleaze Ball, titled Villains Lair, a collector card set consisting of 16 of Szekeres's villainous artworks created specifically for the event were distributed to members and partygoers. Szekeres released his own collector card set The Art of Jozef Szekeres: Mermaids & Mermers in 2008 collecting 100 artworks. They range from unpublished pieces early in his career to his most recent published works of that time.

=== Sculpture and Toy Design ===
Szekeres has had a fascination with figural sculpture from childhood. Early in his career he sculpted maquettes for Disney's Aladdin and Jasmine, Dylandra, and adult Wendy. Szekeres further explored sculpture adding new sculptural elements to Barbie and G.I. Joe purchased toy parts.

In 2003, Szekeres released his first fashion character/doll Elizabet Bizelle (with sister character Kotalin Bizelle) titled Dangerous Discovery, the first Australian created fashion doll.

In 2006, Szekeres released his doll editions Elizabet Bizelle Lady in Red, and Kotalin Bizelle Birthday Bash.

In November 2020, Szekeres released his GlamourOZ Dolls Collection of 10 editions. It reintroduced his new sculpts of original caucasian characters Kotalin & Elizabet Bizelle. It also now includes two new characters, Asian Lucielle Lei and Indigenous Australian Bindi Merinda (which reflects Australia's cultural diversity). The Kotalin Bizelle doll "Ribbon Reveal" was the recipient of the 2020 DOLLS Award of Excellence Industry Choice Winner. Ten editions were released. Eight titled mainline editions were released, each edition numbering 375. Two variant editions each numbering 100, featuring hair colour variations.

== See also ==
- Elfquest
