= 2008 Summer Olympics marketing =

2008 Summer Olympics marketing has been a long running campaign that began when Beijing won its bid to host the games in 2001.

== Symbols ==
=== Emblem ===
The 2008 Summer Olympics emblem is known as Dancing Beijing (Chinese: 舞动的北京) designed by Guo Chunning. The emblem combines a traditional Chinese red seal and a representation of the calligraphic character jīng (京, "national capital", also the second character of Beijing's Chinese name) with athletic features. The open arms of the calligraphic word symbolizes the invitation of China to the world to share in its culture. IOC president Jacques Rogge was very happy with the emblem, saying, "Your new emblem immediately conveys the awesome beauty and power of China which are embodied in your heritage and your people."

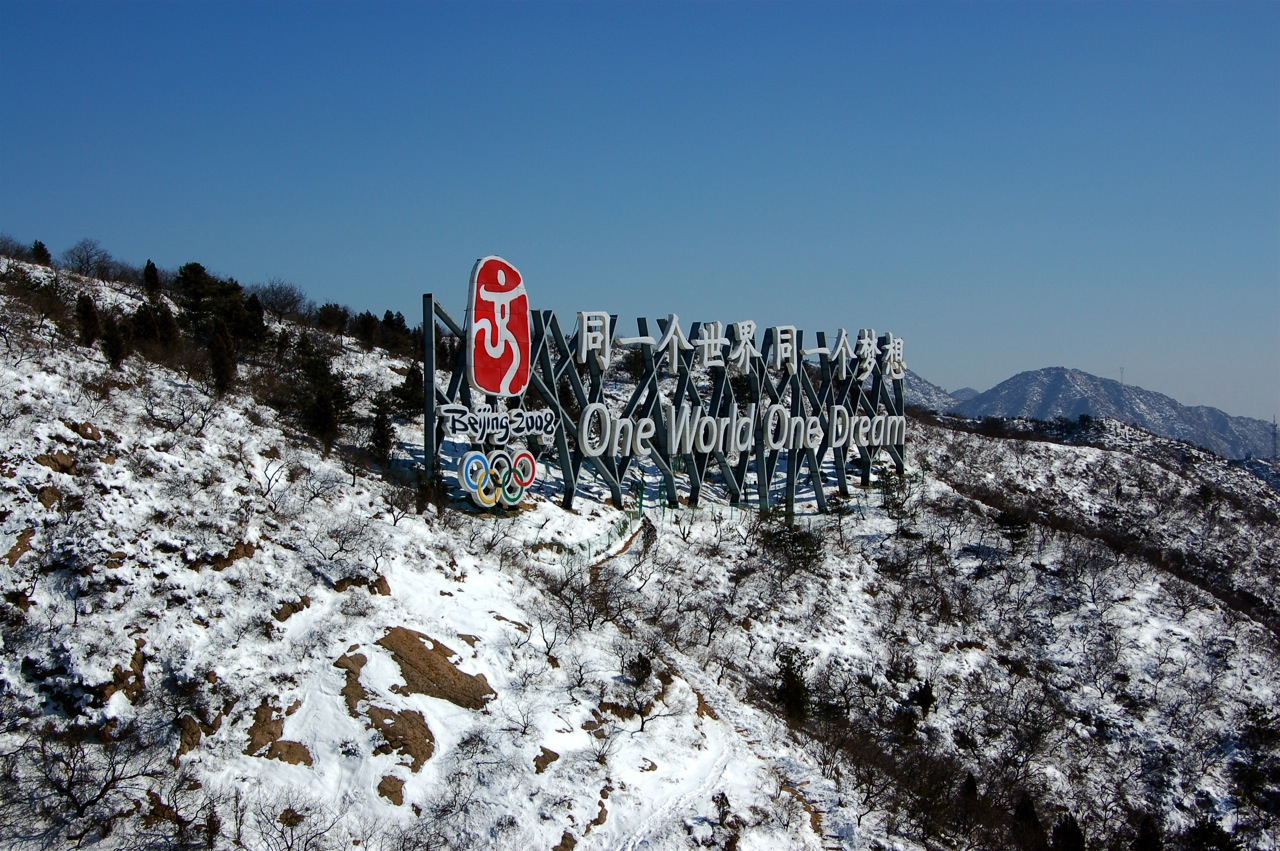
The official slogan mounted in Beijing

=== Slogan ===
The slogan for the 2008 Olympics is "One World, One Dream" (simplified Chinese: 同一个世界 同一个梦想; traditional Chinese: 同一個世界 同一個夢想; pinyin: Tóng Yíge Shìjiè Tóng Yíge Mèngxiǎng.) The slogan calls upon the whole world to join in the Olympic spirit and build a better future for humanity. It was chosen from over 210,000 entries submitted from around the world.

=== Look of the Games ===
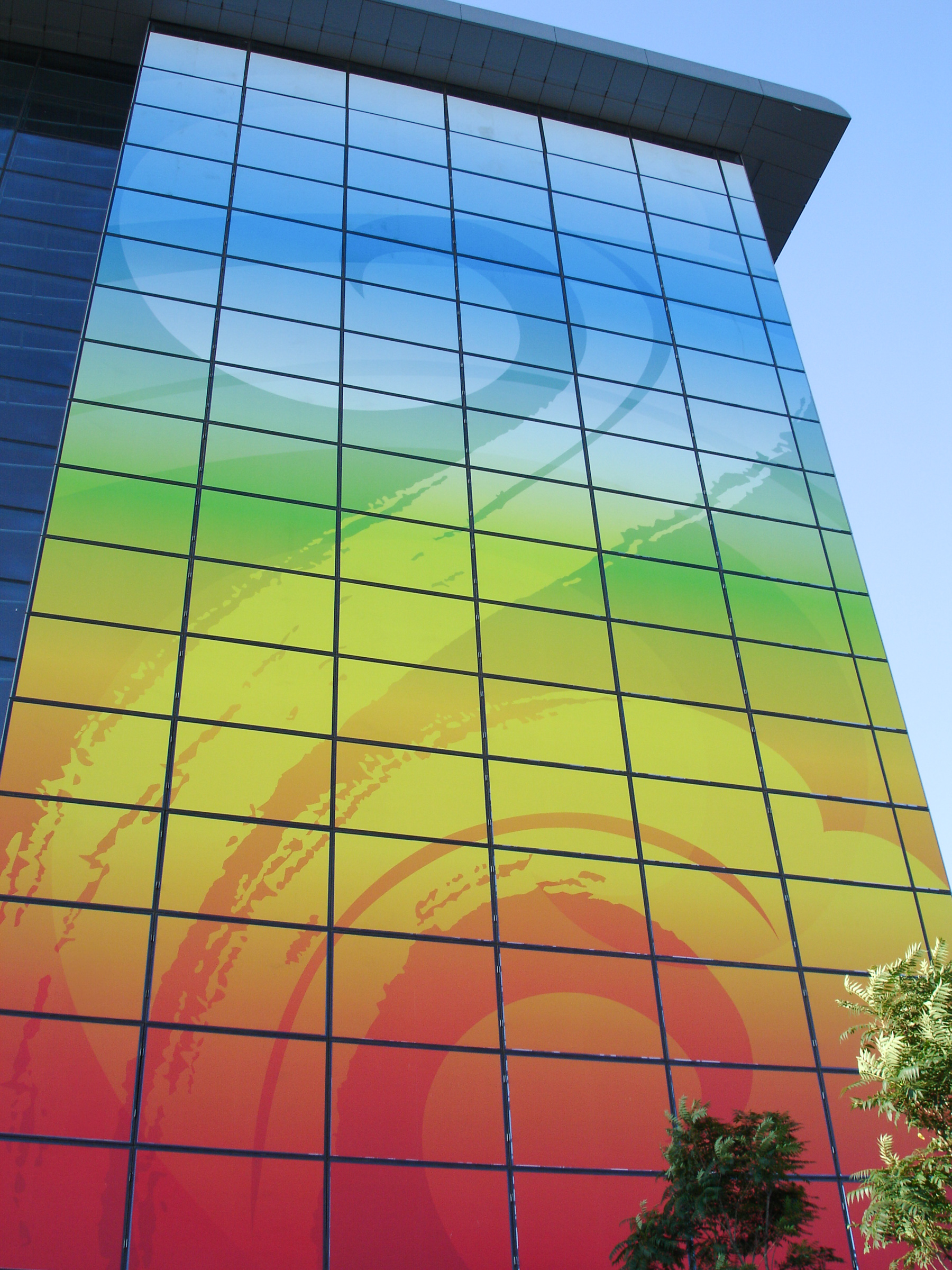
The four primary colours and "Lucky Cloud" pattern displayed at China National Convention Center

Four primary colours were used in the branding of the games. China Red, Yellow, Lime Green, and Sky Blue. These colours were used to represent China, sun, land, and water, respectively.

The graphic elements of the Look of the Games for the Beijing 2008 Olympics was centered on the "Lucky Cloud," a motif found throughout Chinese art. Consistent with past Olympic Games, the Look of the Games was most prominently used on decorations found throughout Beijing 2008 host cities and official venues. Additionally, the Beijing 2008 Look of the Games was applied to the official invitation from the IOC to all National Olympic Committees to participate in the Beijing 2008 Olympic Games, on official Beijing 2008 merchandise and tickets, on the official Beijing 2008 Volunteer and Staff uniforms, and on various other official and/or promotional material.

The Look of the Games was edited for the International Torch Relay of the Beijing 2008 Olympic Games. The graphic identify of the "Lucky Cloud" motif remained, and an ancient Chinese phoenix motif was added to further represent the themes of the Torch Relay.

=== Mascots ===
The official 2008 Olympic Mascots are the five Fuwa (Chinese: 福娃, literally "good luck dolls"). The Fuwa consist of five members that incorporate fish, giant panda, fire, Tibetan antelope, and swallow designs. The Fuwa each have as their primary color one of the colors of the five Olympic Rings that stand for the five continents. The five Fuwa are named Beibei, Jingjing, Huanhuan, Yingying, and Nini. When the first syllable of each of the five names are said together, the result is the phrase 北京欢迎你 (Běijīng huānyíng nĭ) which means "Beijing welcomes you".

== Tickets ==
In April 2007, over seven million tickets for sporting events and ceremonies went on sale. Approximately 75% of tickets went on sale through the Beijing Organizing Committee for the Olympic Games, which set low ticket prices for domestic tickets, to encourage the Chinese people to attend the Games. International tickets are available through each nation's NOC. By June 2007, 2.2 million tickets had already been sold. The last round of some 250,000 tickets were on sale in Beijing on 25 July 2008. Long lines were formed the day before at the ticket office including many who slept overnight. Another 570,000 tickets for football matches are up for grabs in co-host cities just weeks before the opening.

== Merchandising ==
Since early 2007, licensed Olympics merchandise stores have been in business throughout China. More than 800 official stores were in operation at the end of July 2007. Since August 2007, Olympic merchandise has been made available online, with more than 5000 products available via the official merchandising website, which include apparel, mascot dolls, key-chains and commemorative chopsticks.

In November 2007, the overseas Olympic eshop provided online access to customers all over the world to the official licensed products of the Beijing 2008 Olympic Games, excluding the USA, Japan, UK, Canada and China.

== Banknotes ==
The People's Bank of China issued a new 10-yuan note without the picture of Mao Zedong featuring a Greek discus thrower and the Beijing National Stadium. A total of 6 million notes were released at 10 yuan (US$1.46). Another 4 million notes were released in Hong Kong as a special-edition note at HK$20 (US$2.56) before the official release on 15 July 2008. Of the 4 million notes, 3.76 million of them were sold in Hong Kong, with the remainder sold to Macau and the overseas community, ranging from HK$138 to HK$1,338. Thousands of people formed long lines outside the Hong Kong Bank of China branch more than 48 hours before the notes were issued.

== Multimedia ==
=== Opening ceremony ===
An international release of a double DVD set of the opening ceremony was released on 11 August 2008 in Mandarin and English.

=== Albums ===
On 5 May 2008 an official Olympic soundtrack album titled The Official Album for the Beijing 2008 Olympic Games was released featuring various artists including Andy Lau, Wakin Chau, A-Mei Chang, Nicholas Tse, Coco Lee, Jackie Chan, Natasha Na (那英), Leehom Wang, Han Geng, Joey Yung, Sun Nan, David Huang (黃大煒), Stefanie Sun, Jay Chou, Wang Feng (汪峰), Han Hong (韓紅), Wei Wei, Liu Huan, Dai Yu Chen (戴玉強), Yu Quan, Xu Yang (徐洋), Tan Jing, Bibi Zhou, Jane Zhang. It also included one Korean artist, Jang Na-ra. On 7 August 2008 Jackie Chan became the only male singer authorized to release his own version of the same album.

Another album was released around 14 August 2008 titled The Olympics Album - One World One Dream: featuring Krystal Meyers, Fireflight, Avril Lavigne, Joanna Wang, Coco Lee, Sun Nan, David Huang (黃大煒) and Tan Jing.

== Songs ==
=== Theme songs ===
The official song for the Games' one-year countdown celebration was "We are Ready". The song was sung by an ensemble of 133 artists from Hong Kong, Taiwan, mainland China, Singapore and Korea. The song is composed by Hong Kong songwriter Peter Kam with lyrics by Keith Chen. Among the participating HK singers are Alan Tam, Hacken Lee, Eason Chan, Joey Yung, Gigi Leung, Leo Ku and Jackie Chan. Elva Hsiao, David Huang, and Chris Yu represented Taiwan. Stefanie Sun and A-Do also represented Singapore. While JJ Lin represented Malaysia. Also with Jang Na-ra representing Korea. Bibi Zhou, Li Yuchun, Jane Zhang, Pu Shu, Wang Feng, Han Geng and Huang Xiaoming represented mainland China.

"You and Me", the official theme song for the Games themselves, was first performed at the opening ceremony by Liu Huan and Sarah Brightman. Containing both Mandarin and English lyrics, it was composed by Chen Qigang, a Shanghai born French-Chinese.

=== Beijing songs ===
Beijing Welcomes You was the theme song for the 100-day countdown celebration. "I am a Star" and "Smile Beijing" have been selected as theme songs for the Beijing Olympic Volunteers Committee. Beijing Beijing, I Love Beijing was performed at the closing ceremony.

=== Torch relay songs ===
The official theme for the torch relay was "Light the Passion, Share the Dream" (simplified Chinese: 点燃激情，传递梦想; traditional Chinese: 點燃激情 傳遞夢想), performed by Wang Leehom, Stefanie Sun, Jane Zhang and Wang Feng, with the English version performed by the 106 contestants of Miss World 2007. Another song to accompany the relay is "Red around the world" composed by Wyman Wong with lyrics by Albert Leung. The song also happens to be the new Coca-Cola promotional song. Individual versions are available for different artists such as Jacky Cheung, S.H.E, Will Pan.

=== Other songs ===
Chinese-American singer Coco Lee and mainland singer Sun Nan performed a promotional duet "Forever Friends", and Nicholas Tse and Joey Yung sings "Together On The Blue Planet". Twenty-eight different sports are represented by 28 mainland China singers in a promotion video and song called "In Magnificent Shape to Uphold the Dream". Members include Fan Bingbing, Eva Huang (黃聖依), and Li Bingbing. Korea artists also contributed. Rain performed "Any Dream". Jang Na-ra performed "Our Dream", Zhang Liyin performed "One More Try", and Super Junior M performed "The One".

== Film ==
The film "One Person's Olympics" supported by Beijing's Olympic promotion committee shows Jackie Chan, Stefanie Sun, Leehom Wang, and Han Hong singing "Stand Up Together" in unison.

== Video games ==
Two video games were made for this event. Beijing 2008 is the official game for the 2008 Olympics developed by Eurocom. Mario & Sonic at the Olympic Games was published by Sega in North America and Europe and published by Nintendo in Japan.

== Animations ==
A Chinese animation titled The Olympic Adventures of Fuwa was jointly produced by BTV and Kaku Cartoon.

== Stamps ==
The United Nations Postal Administration launched six commemorative stamps by Brazilian pop-artist Romero Britto released on 8 August.

A special edition of stamps were issued by Hong Kong Post on 9 August with the theme of hosting the Equestrian event. Two limited edition products - Prestige Crystal Blocks Gift Set and the Beijing 2008 Olympic Games Limited Edition Prestige Stamp Album was on sale at 37 philatelic offices with limited stocks available. The album is issued in a limited edition of 6,000 copies with a certificate.

== Corporate sponsorship ==
Sponsors of the 2008 Summer Olympics
Worldwide Olympic Partners
- Atos Origin
- Coca-Cola
- General Electric
- Johnson & Johnson
- Kodak
- Lenovo
- Manulife
- McDonald's
- Omega SA
- Panasonic
- Samsung Electronics
- Visa Inc.
Partners
- Adidas
- Air China
- Bank of China
- China Mobile
- China National Petroleum Corporation
- China Netcom
- People's Insurance Company of China
- State Grid Corporation of China
- Sinopec
- Volkswagen
Sponsors
- Anheuser-Busch (Budweiser)
- Beijing Yanjing Brewery
- BHP Billiton
- Haier
- Hengyuanxiang Group
- Sohu
- Tsingtao Brewery
- Uni-President China
- United Parcel Service
- Yili Group
Exclusive Suppliers
- Aggreko
- Beifa Group
- COFCO Group (Great Wall Wine)
- DB Schenker
- Gehua Ticketmaster
- Jinlongyu Cooking Oils
- Mars Inc. (Snickers)
- Mengna Knitting
- Qianxihe
- Royale Furniture Holdings
- Staples Inc.
- Synear Food Holdings
- Technogym
- Vatti
- Yadu Science and Technology
Suppliers
- Aifly
- Aokang Group
- Capinfo
- Crystal CG
- Dayun Group
- EF Education First
- Kokuyo
- Liby Group
- Microsoft
- Mondo
- NewAuto
- PricewaterhouseCoopers
- Taishan Sports
- Unipack
- Yuanpei Translation

== See also ==
- Find The Lost Ring, an Alternate Reality Game
- 2012 Summer Olympics marketing
- 2016 Summer Olympics marketing
- 2020 Summer Olympics marketing
- Great Big Events, one of the key marketing and event management organisations
