= Beijing Welcomes You =

Song by various artists

from the album The Official Album for the Beijing 2008 Olympic Games
- Language: Mandarin
- Released: 17 April 2008
- Recorded: First half of 2008
- Studio: Various
- Genre: Mandopop
- Length: 6:58
- Label: China Record
- Composer: Xiao Ke
- Lyricist: Albert Leung

Beijing Welcomes You (Chinese: 北京欢迎你; pinyin: Běijīng huānyíng nǐ) is a feature song for the 100-day countdown to the 2008 Summer Olympics held in Beijing, China. The song comprises one hundred famous artists and entertainers from mainland China, Hong Kong, Taiwan, Singapore, Japan and South Korea. Its music video includes a montage of scenes from all over Beijing. It features the largest contingent of famous artists in a single Chinese-language music video.

== Title ==
The 5 characters in the original Chinese title of the song ("Beijing Huanying Ni") were used for the names of the "Fuwa" mascots which symbolized the 2008 Summer Olympics: Bei-Bei: fish, Jing-Jing: giant panda, Huan-Huan: the fire, Ying-Ying: gazelle, and Ni-Ni: swallow.

The song runs over six minutes in length. Since its release the song has been extremely popular with the Chinese public.

== Artists featured ==
(in order of appearance)

- Chen Tianjia
- Liu Huan
- Na Ying
- Stefanie Sun
- Sun Yue
- Wang Leehom
- Han Hong
- Wakin Chau
- Gigi Leung
- Yu Quan
- Jackie Chan
- Richie Jen
- Jolin Tsai
- Sun Nan
- Bibi Zhou
- Wei Wei
- Huang Xiaoming
- Han Geng
- Wang Feng
- Karen Mok
- Tan Jing
- Eason Chan
- Yan Weiwen
- Dai Yuqiang
- Li Shuangsong
- Wang Xia
- Liao Changyong
- Lin Yilun
- Jang Na-ra
- JJ Lin
- A-do
- Joey Yung
- Li Yuchun
- Huang Dawei
- Chen Kun
- Nicholas Tse
- Han Lei
- Vivian Hsu
- Fei Xiang
- Tang Can
- Lin Chi-ling
- Zhang Zilin
- Jane Zhang
- Valen Hsu
- Sky Wu
- Yang Kun
- Christine Fan
- You Hongming
- Zhou Xiao'ou
- Sha Baoliang
- Jin Haixin
- Peter Ho
- F.I.R
- Pang Long
- Qi Feng
- Li Yugang
- Kenji Wu
- 5566
- Anson Hu
- Yumiko Cheng
- Dao Lang
- Ji Minjia
- Tu Honggang
- Denis Ng
- Guo Rong
- Liu Genghong
- Tengger
- Jin Sha
- Su Xing
- Wei Jia
- Fu Lishan
- Huang Zheng
- Jaycee Chan

== Locations depicted ==
The song's music video features the above entertainers appearing in some of Beijing's most renowned sites and locations, as well as the stadiums of the Olympic Green; in order of appearances, some of them are listed below:

- Zhengyangmen gate - Chen Tianjia
- Beijing National Stadium (Bird's Nest) - Liu Huan
- Deshengmen gate - Na Ying
- Beihai Park - Stefanie Sun
- Pudu Temple - Sun Yue
- China Millennium Monument - Leehom Wang
- Peking University - Han Hong
- Imperial Ancestral Temple (Taimiao) - Wakin Chau
- Imperial College (Guozijian) - Gigi Leung
- Sections of the Great Wall of China - Jackie Chan
- Liulichang - Richie Ren
- Shunyi Olympic Rowing-Canoeing Park - Jolin Tsai
- National Grand Theatre - Sun Nan
- Beijing National Aquatics Center (Water Cube) - Bibi Zhou
- Various siheyuans in Beijing - Han Geng, Li Yuchun, David Huang, Chen Kun and many other artists
- Beijing Ancient Observatory - Wang Feng
- Zhongshan Park - Karen Mok
- Temple of Earth - Eason Chan
- Beijing Wukesong Culture & Sports Center - Yan Weiwen
- Confucius Temple of Beijing - Dai Yuqiang
- Shichahai - various artists
- Capital Museum - Liao Changyong
- Drum Tower and Bell Tower - Jang Na-ra
- Huguang Guild Hall Peking Opera House - JJ Lin & A-Do
- Forbidden City - Joey Yung, Nicholas Tse, Yumiko Cheng
- Beijing World Trade Center - Vivian Hsu
- Meridian Gate - Lin Chiling
- Central TV Tower - Peter Ho
- Residence of Lao She - Jaycee Chan
- Temple of Heaven
- Subway Line 13 train and station
- Beijing Capital International Airport, Terminal 2 and Terminal 3
- Lotus Flower Market, Houhai
- Tian'anmen Square
- Nine Dragon Screen
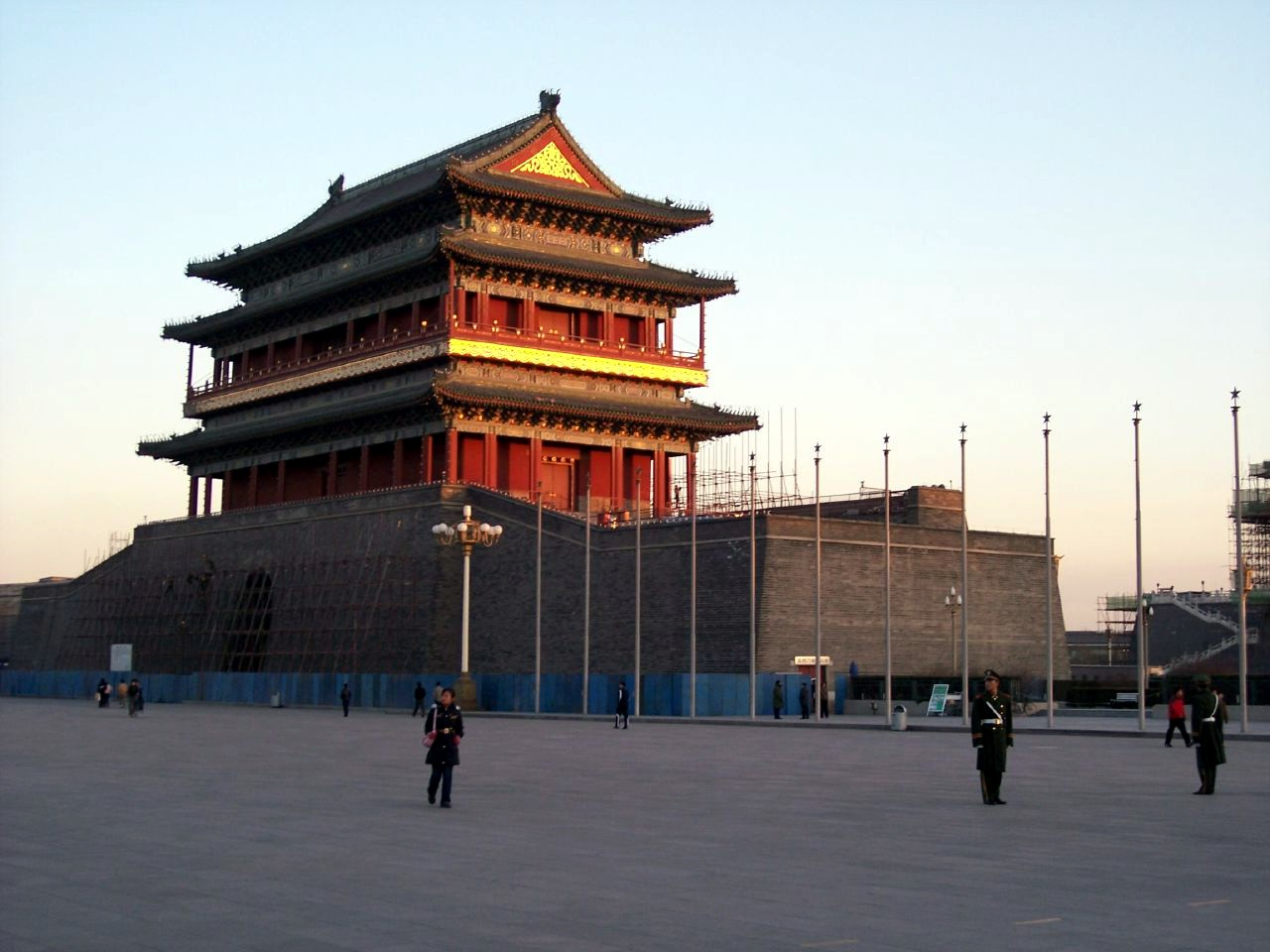
Zhengyangmen gate

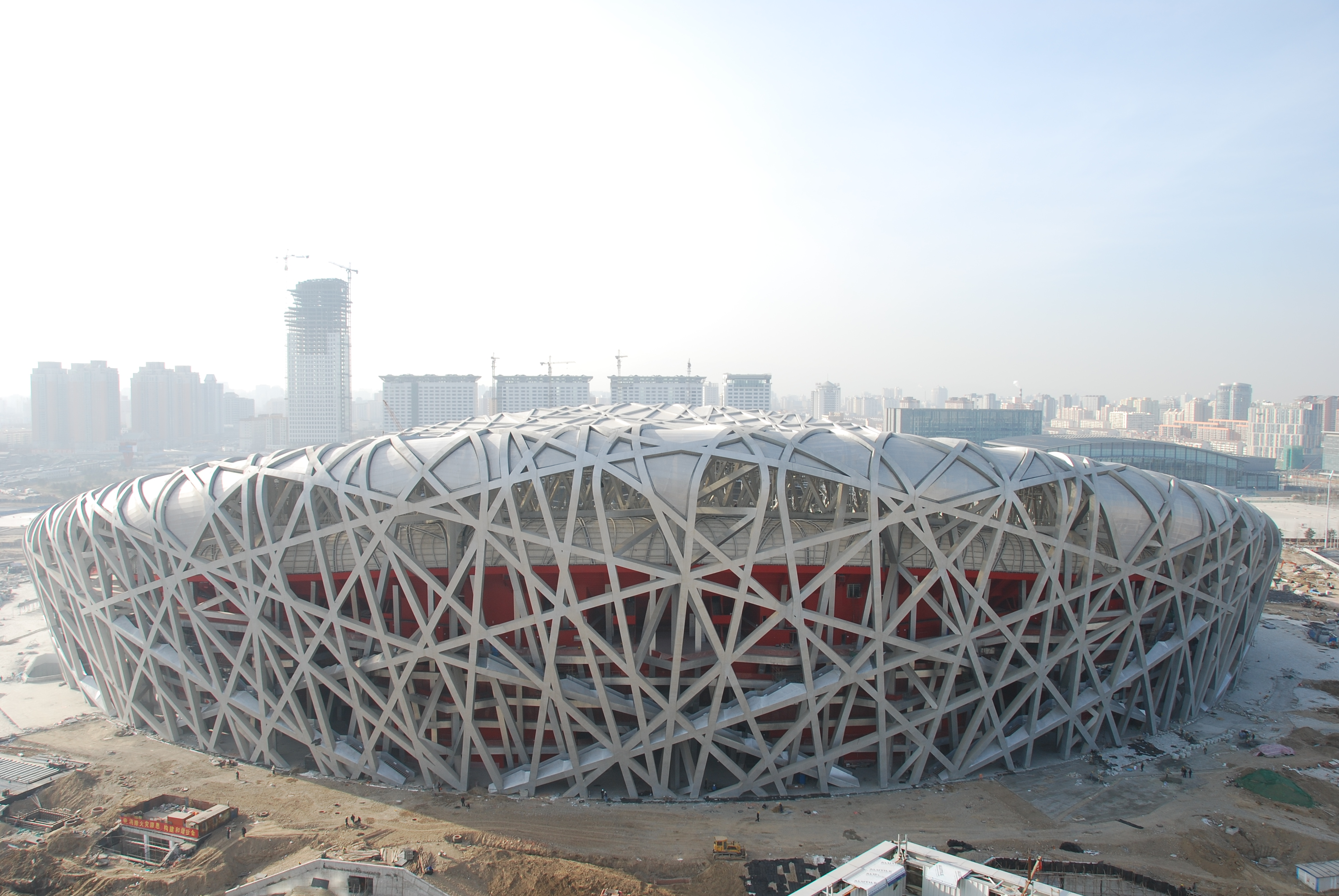
Beijing National Stadium

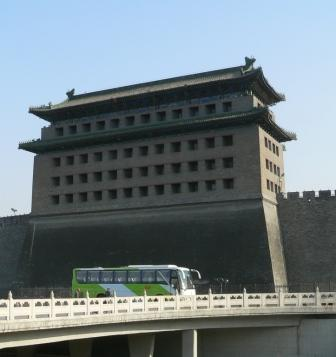
Deshengmen gate

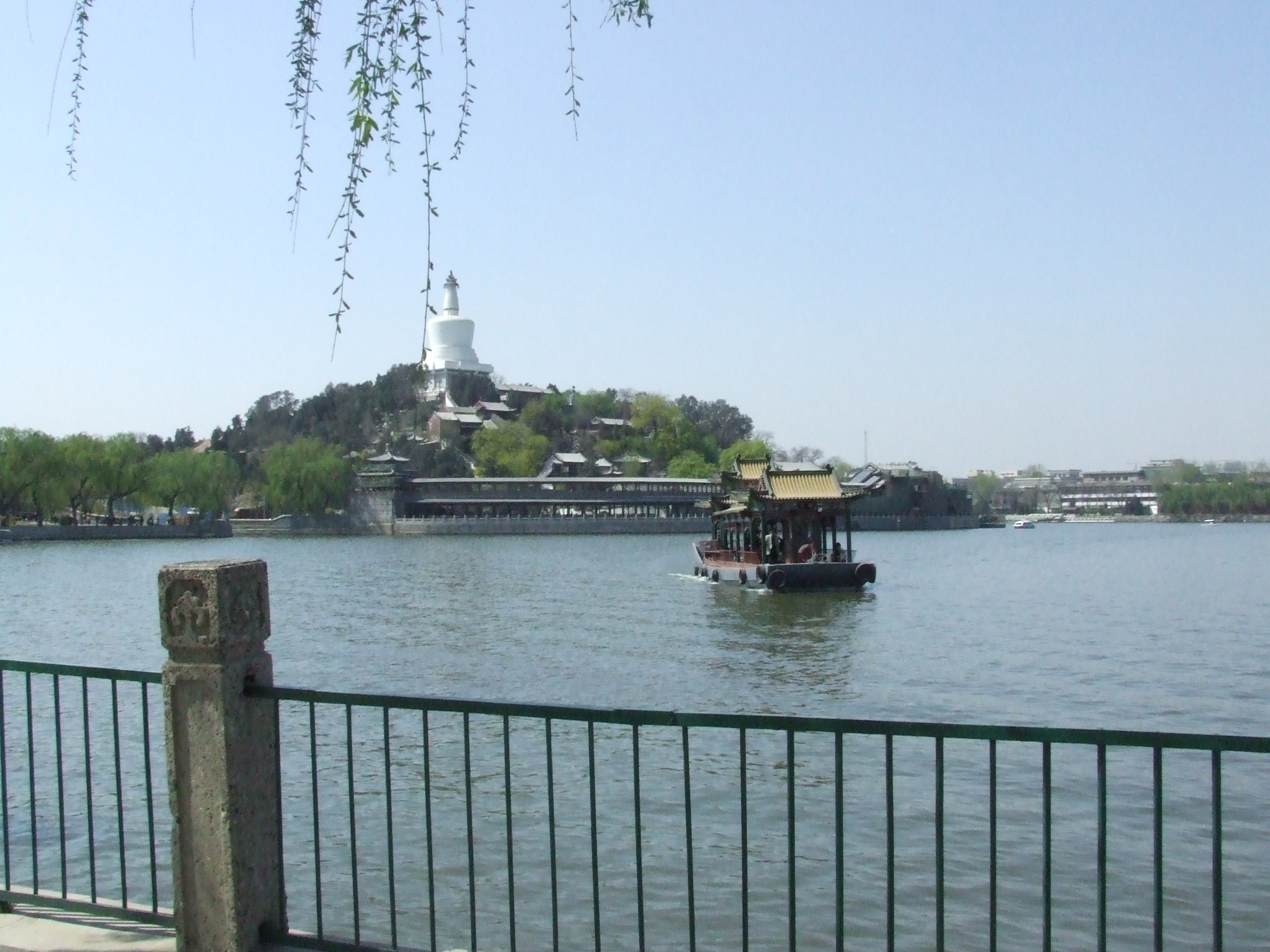
Beihai Park

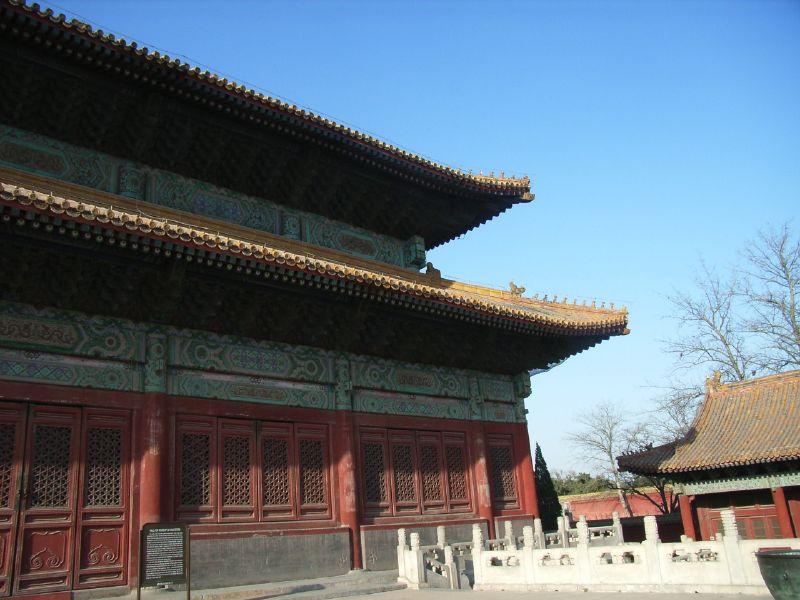
Imperial Ancestral Temple

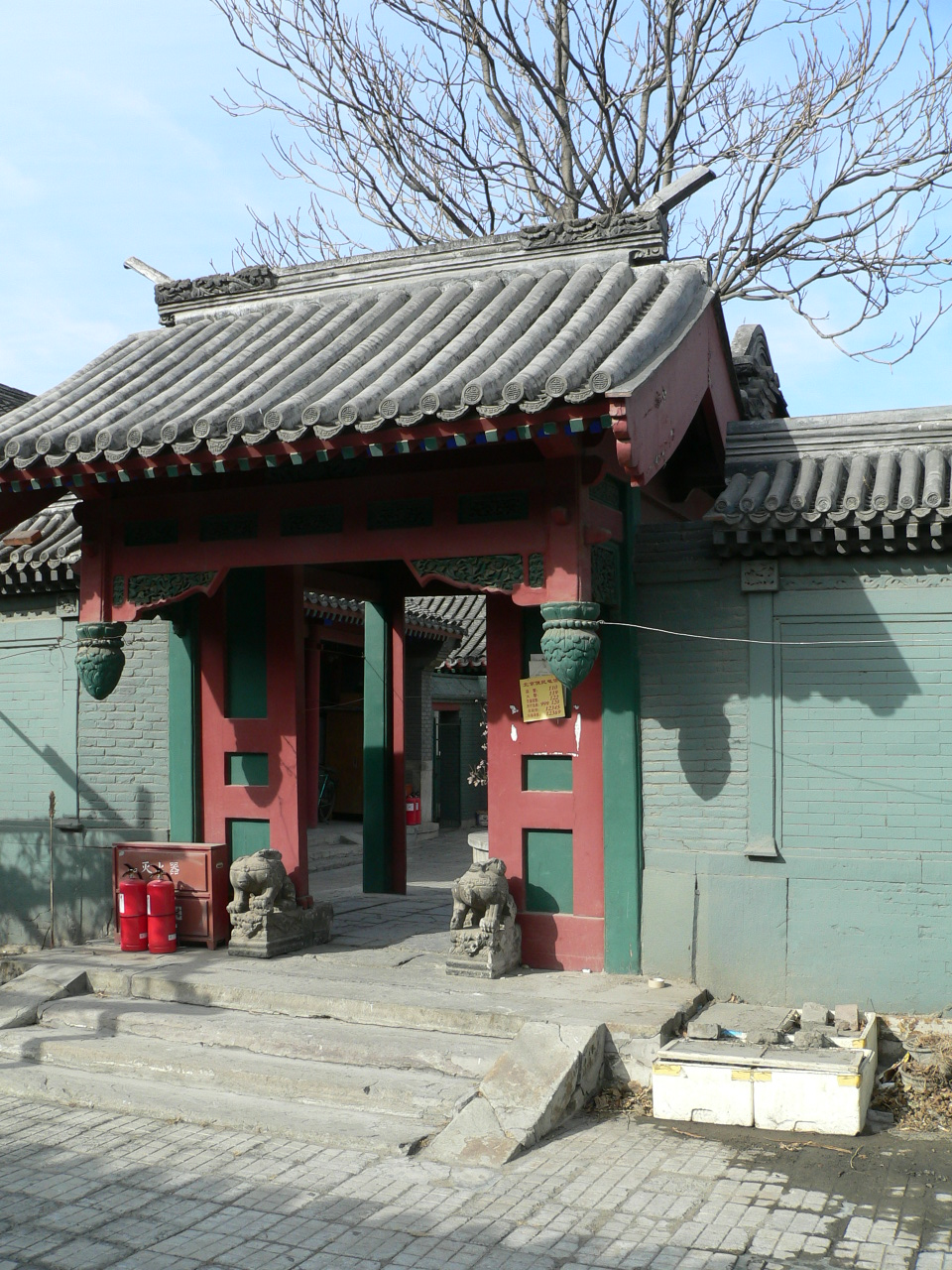
Siheyuans of Beijing

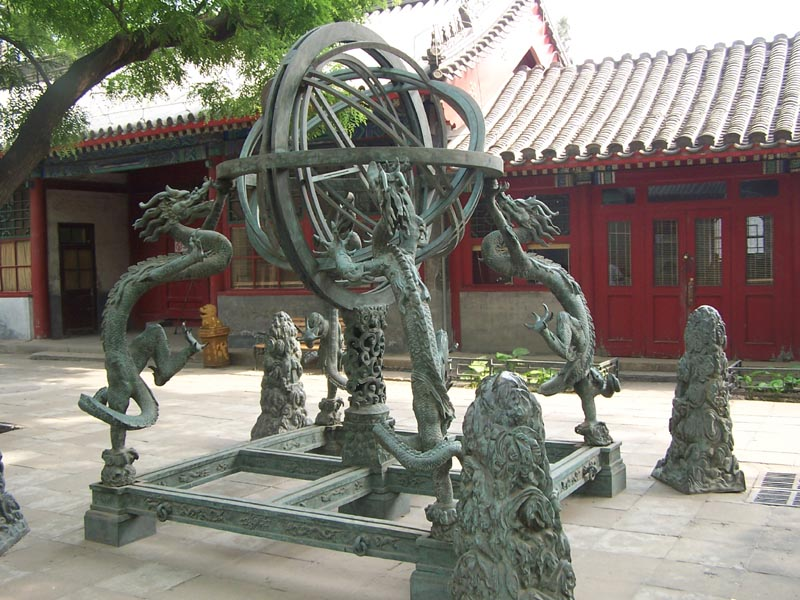
Beijing Ancient Observatory

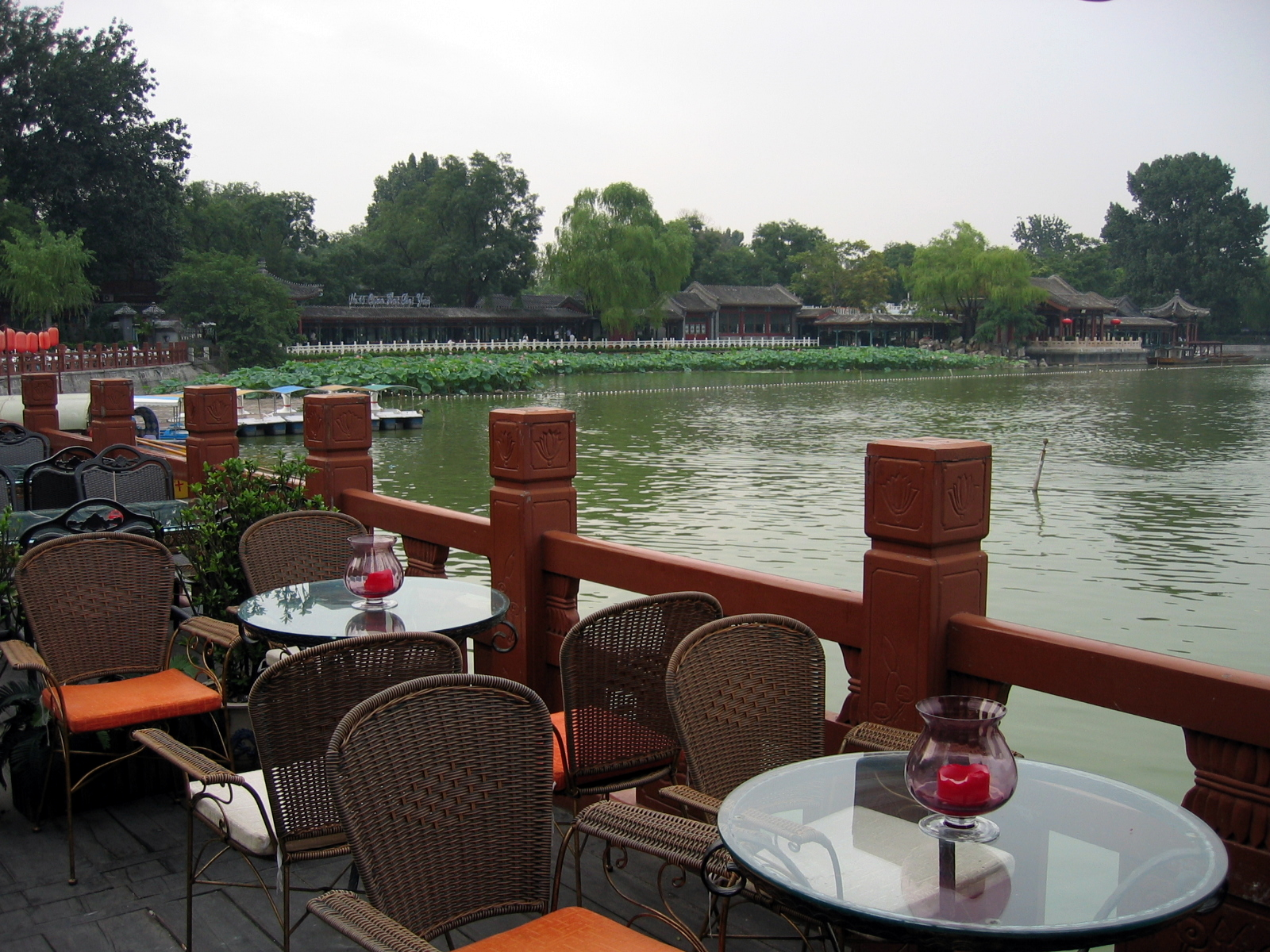
Shichahai

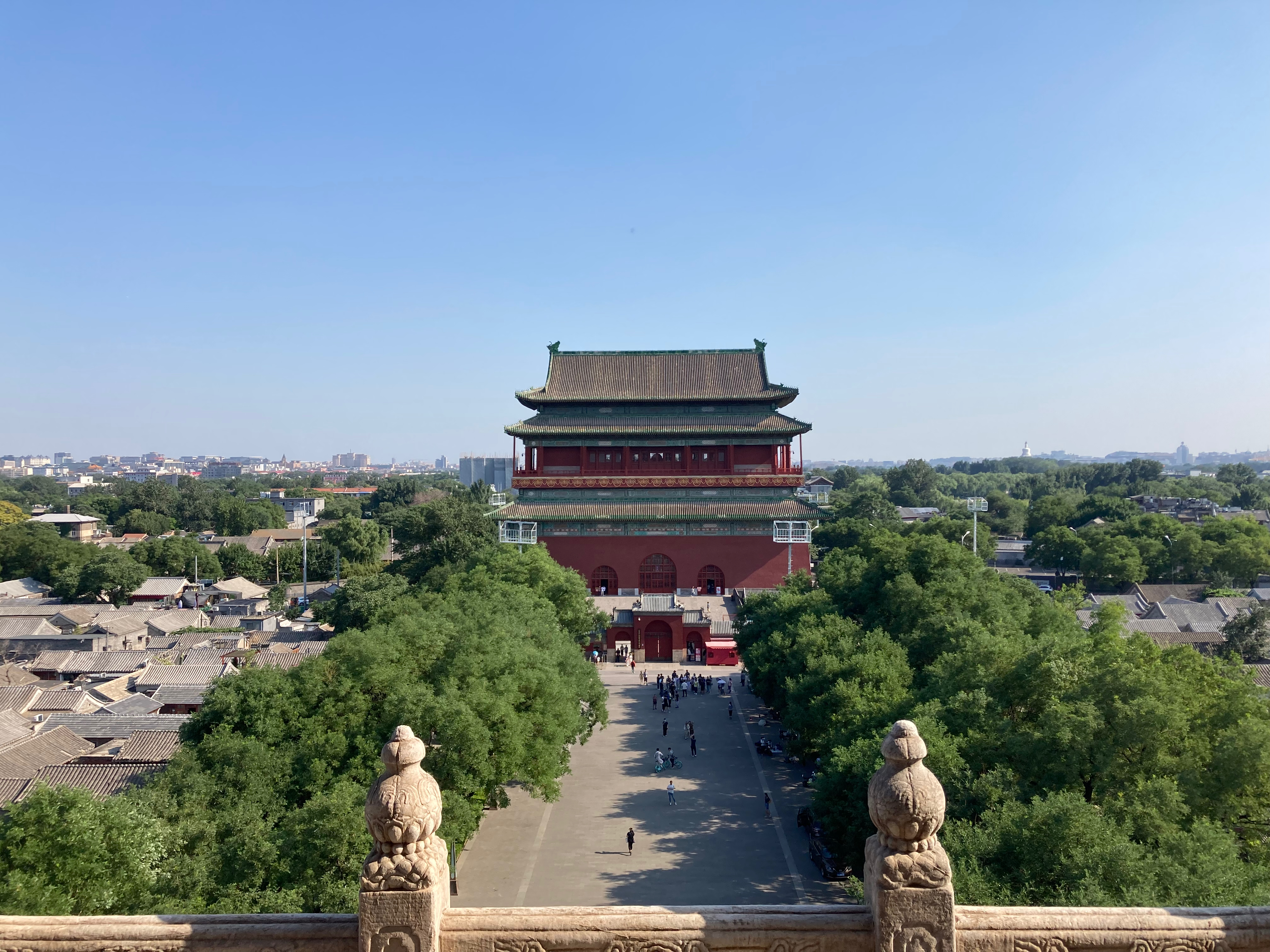
Drum Tower of Beijing

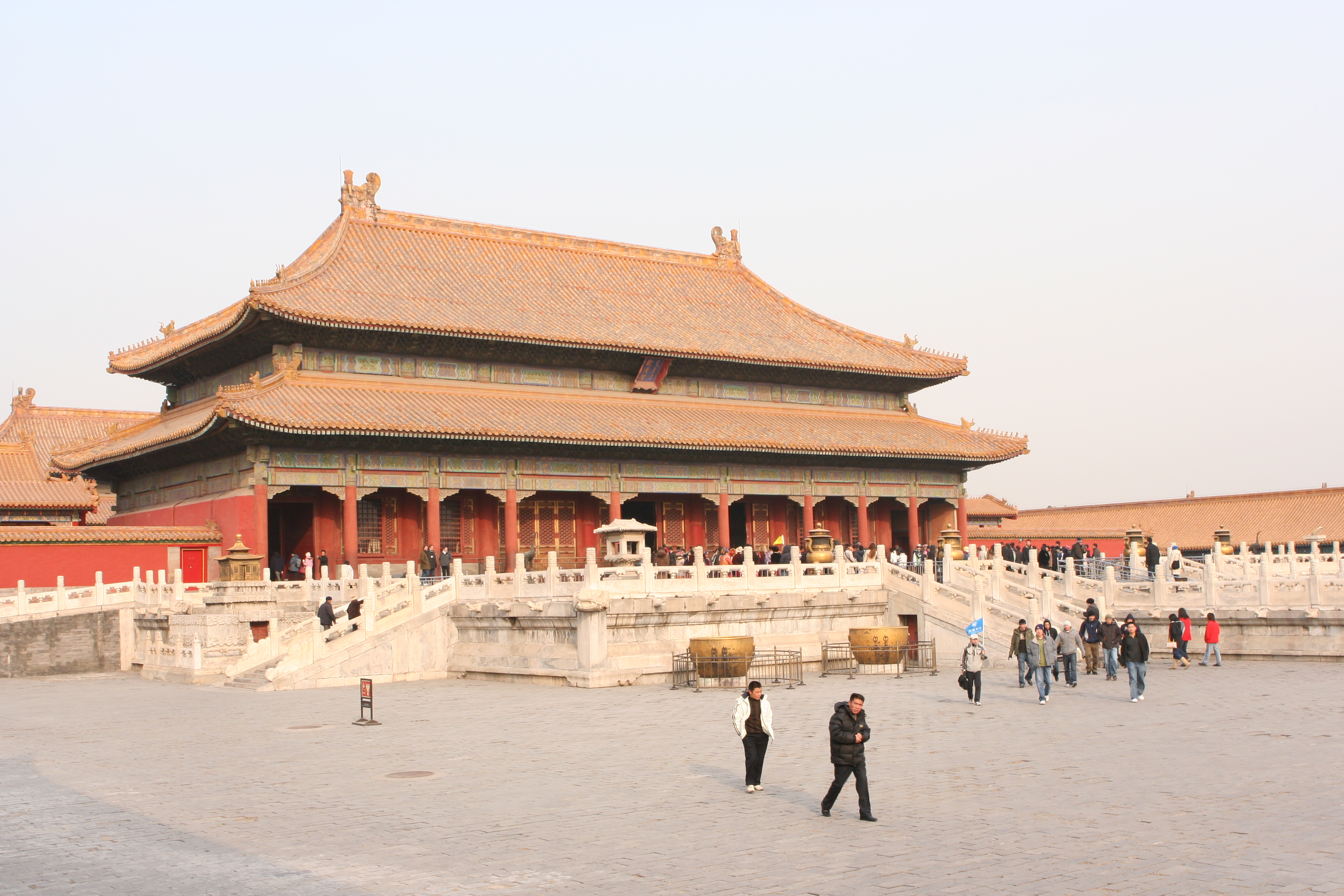
The Forbidden City

== Lyrics ==
迎接另一个晨曦 带来全新空气

Welcome another dawn that brings fresh air with it

气息改变情味不变 茶香飘满情谊

The scent changes, the mood remains the same, the tea's fragrance is full of friendship

我家大门常打开 开放怀抱等你

The door of my house is always open, waiting for you with open arms

拥抱过就有了默契 你会爱上这里

After hugging there will be a new understanding, you will fall in love with this place

不管远近都是客人 请不用客气

Whether you're from near or far, there's no need to be too polite

相约好了在一起 我们欢迎你

We made an appointment to spend time together, we welcome you

我家种着万年青 开放每段传奇

My family grows evergreens, opening every legend

为传统的土壤播种 为你留下回忆

Sow seeds in traditional soil, leaving memories for you

陌生熟悉都是客人 请不用拘礼

Whether we know each other well or you're a stranger everyone is a guest, there's no need to be too polite

第几次来没关系 有太多话题

It doesn't matter how many times you've come here before, there are so many things to discuss

北京欢迎你 为你开天辟地

Beijing welcomes you and creates a new world for you

流动中的魅力充满着朝气

The flowing charm is full of vitality

北京欢迎你 在太阳下分享呼吸

Beijing welcomes you, share a breath under the sun

在黄土地刷新成绩

Set a new record in the yellow land

我家大门常打开 开怀容纳天地

The door of my house is always open, open to hold the world

岁月绽放青春笑容 迎接这个日期

Time blossoms with youthful smiles to welcome this date

天大地大都是朋友 请不用客气

From all over the world we are all friends, please feel welcome

画意诗情带笑意 只为等待你

Paintings and poetry bring smiles, just awaiting you

北京欢迎你 像音乐感动你

Beijing welcomes you like how music touches you

让我们都加油去超越自己

Let's all work hard to do our best

北京欢迎你 有梦想谁都了不起

Beijing welcomes you, with a dream anyone can be great

有勇气就会有奇迹

Miracles can happen if you have courage

北京欢迎你 为你开天辟地

Beijing welcomes you and creates a new world for you

流动中的魅力充满着朝气

The flowing charm is full of vitality

北京欢迎你 在太阳下分享呼吸

Beijing welcomes you, share a breath under the sun

在黄土地刷新成绩

Set a new record in the yellow land

北京欢迎你 像音乐感动你

Beijing welcomes you like how music touches you

让我们都加油去超越自己

Let's all work hard to do our best

北京欢迎你 有梦想谁都了不起

Beijing welcomes you, with a dream anyone can be great

有勇气就会有奇迹

Miracles can happen if you have courage

我家大门常打开 开放怀抱等你

The door of my house is always open, waiting for you with open arms

拥抱过就有了默契 你会爱上这里

After hugging, there will be a tacit understanding, you will fall in love with this place

不管远近都是客人 请不用客气

Whether you're from near or far, there's no need to be too polite

相约好了在一起 我们欢迎你

We made an appointment to spend time together, we welcome you

北京欢迎你 为你开天辟地

Beijing welcomes you and creates a new world for you

流动中的魅力充满着朝气

The flowing charm is full of vitality

北京欢迎你 在太阳下分享呼吸

Beijing welcomes you, share a breath under the sun

在黄土地刷新成绩

Set a new record in the yellow land

我家大门常打开 开怀容纳天地

The door of my house is always open, open to hold the world

岁月绽放青春笑容 迎接这个日期

Time blossoms with youthful smiles to welcome this date

天大地大都是朋友 请不用客气

From all over the world we are all friends, please feel welcome

画意诗情带笑意 只为等待你

Paintings and poetry bring smiles, just awaiting you

北京欢迎你 像音乐感动你

Beijing welcomes you like how music touches you

让我们都加油去超越自己

Let's all work hard to do our best

北京欢迎你 有梦想谁都了不起

Beijing welcomes you, with a dream anyone can be great

有勇气就会有奇迹

Miracles can happen if you have courage

北京欢迎你 为你开天辟地

Beijing welcomes you and creates a new world for you

流动中的魅力充满着朝气

The flowing charm is full of vitality

北京欢迎你 在太阳下分享呼吸

Beijing welcomes you, share a breath under the sun

在黄土地刷新成绩

Set a new record in the yellow land

北京欢迎你 像音乐感动你

Beijing welcomes you like how music touches you

让我们都加油去超越自己

Let's all work hard to do our best

北京欢迎你 有梦想谁都了不起

Beijing welcomes you, with a dream anyone can be great

有勇气就会有奇迹

Miracles can happen if you have courage

北京欢迎你 有梦想谁都了不起

Beijing welcomes you, with a dream anyone can be great

有勇气就会有奇迹

Miracles can happen if you have courage

北京欢迎你 有梦想谁都了不起

Beijing welcomes you, with a dream anyone can be great

有勇气就会有奇迹

Miracles can happen if you have courage

== See also ==
- 2008 Summer Olympics Opening Ceremony
- 2008 Summer Olympics marketing
