= 2012 Summer Olympics marketing =

2012 Summer Olympics marketing was a long running campaign that began when London won its bid to host the games in 2005.

== Merchandise ==
On 21 July 2009, the LOCOG announced that Hornby had won the licence to develop and market a range associated with the Games. In March 2011, the LOCOG commissioned and published a series of training guides. The merchandise was sold online and in five shops known as "The London 2012 Shop". In addition, Adidas sold its London 2012 range in its flagship store on Oxford Street, and selected Next stores sold their 2012 range. Sainsbury's as official sponsors of the Paralympics also sold merchandise within their stores.

== Official song ==
"Survival", a single released by the English band Muse, was the official song of the Olympics. It was broadcast when the athletes entered the stadium and in the period before medal ceremonies; international broadcasters also played it while reporting on the Games.

== Stamps ==
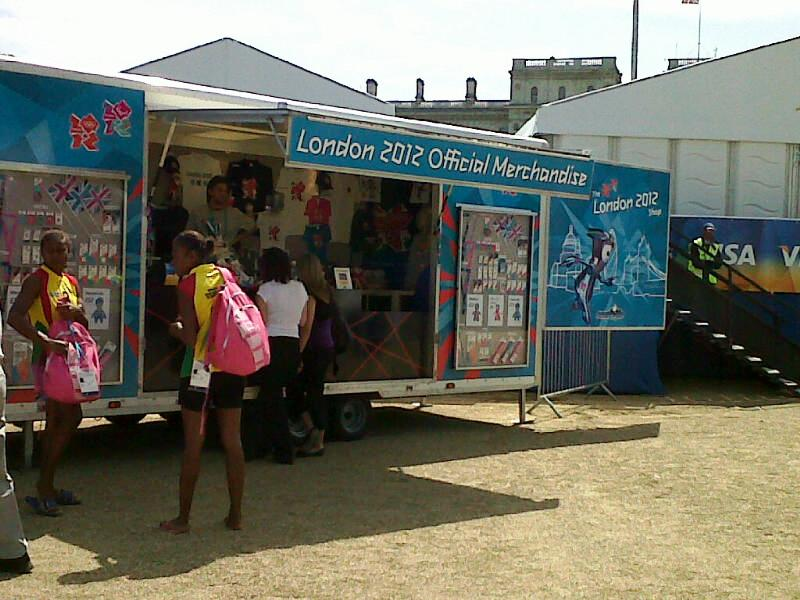
A portable shop at VISA FIVB Beach Volleyball International (2011)

In August 2009, the Royal Mail commissioned artists and illustrators to create 30 stamps which were released in batches of 10 during 2009 to 2011. The choice of 30 stamps for the issue symbolises the fact that the Games take place during the 30th Olympiad. Each stamp featured an Olympic or Paralympic sport and in addition carried the London 2012 logo. The Royal Mail had initially proposed that photographs be included as well but this was abandoned as the photos would have to be of dead people as the only living person allowed to feature on stamps in the United Kingdom is the Queen. Stamps with an Olympic theme go back to the very first games in Athens in 1890 when the organisers commissioned the sale of stamps in order to balance the books and construct the last four venues. When London first held the Games in 1908 no stamps were commissioned. That occasion and 1912 are the only times when stamps were not issued. When London last held the Games in 1948, just four stamps were issued. On 22 July 2011, the last of the 30 stamps were released.

== Coins ==
Two £5 coins were made to mark London 2012 Olympics. As with other Olympics since 1952, the Royal Mint will strike a set of commemorative one-kilogram gold and silver coins. The striking of such large coins necessitated a new Act of Parliament, the Coinage (Measurement) Act 2011.

== Chariots of Fire ==
The 1981 Best Picture Oscar-winning film Chariots of Fire, which depicts Britain's athletics successes in the 1924 Olympics, was also a recurring theme in promotions for the 2012 London Olympics. The film's theme tune was featured at the opening of the 2012 London New Year's fireworks celebrating the Olympics. The tune was also used when five thousand runners first tested the new Olympic Park.

As an official part of the London 2012 Festival celebrations, a new digitally re-mastered version of Chariots of Fire was screened in over 100 cinemas throughout the UK. The re-release began on 13 July 2012, two weeks before the Olympic opening ceremony. A 2012 stage adaptation of the same title also coincides with the Olympics, opening 9 May at London's Hampstead Theatre and transferring to the West End on 23 June.

== Fashion ==
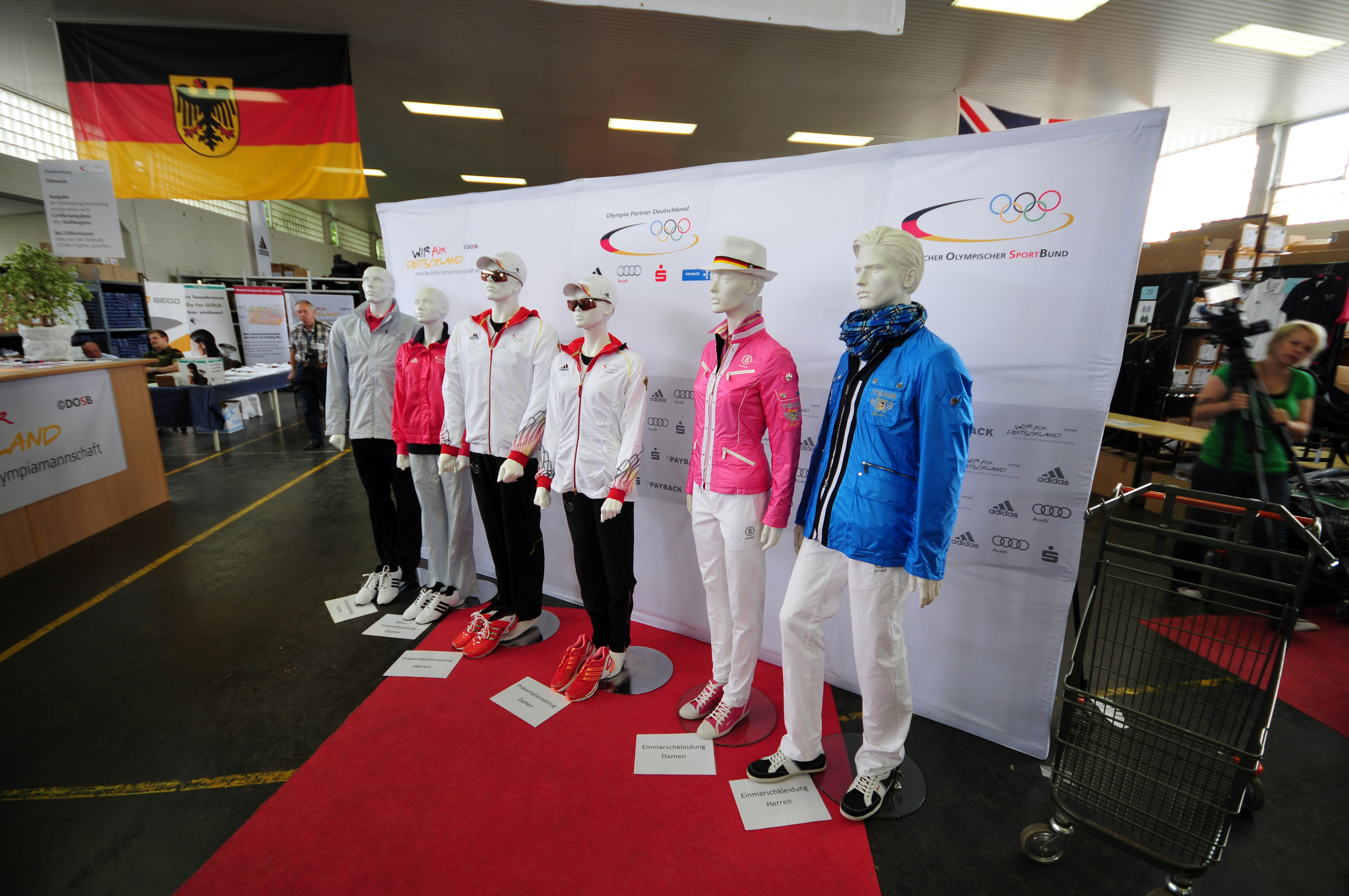
Uniforms of the German Olympic Athletes 2012

The Olympics are known as the greatest fashion show on Earth with a worldwide audience. The outfits have to fly the flag and represent their nation to the world. Fashion designers from all over the world support their countries by creating uniforms for Olympic athletes by combining hi-tech fabrics and stylish designs. The kits consist of performance suits, podium suits, villagewear, and the uniform worn during the Opening and Closing Ceremony.

Australia	Sportscraft, Dunlop, Adidas
Belize	Jeff Banks
Brazil	Nike
Canada	Hudson's Bay Company
China	Nike
France	Hermès, Adidas
Georgia	Adidas
Germany	Bogner
Great Britain	Stella McCartney for Adidas, Next
Italy	Prada, Giorgio Armani
Jamaica	Cedella Marley for Puma
Japan	Asics
New Zealand	Rodd & Gunn
Russia	Bosco
San Marino	Salvatore Ferragamo Italia S.p.A.
South Africa	Erke
South Korea	FILA, Bean Pole
Spain	Bosco
Ukraine	Bosco
United States	Ralph Lauren

== Mascots ==
The official mascots for the 2012 Summer Olympic and Paralympic Games were unveiled on 19 May 2010. Wenlock and Mandeville are animations depicting two drops of steel from a steelworks in Bolton. They are named after the Shropshire town of Much Wenlock, which held a forerunner of the current Olympic Games, and Stoke Mandeville, a village in Buckinghamshire where a forerunner to the Paralympic Games were first held. The writer Michael Morpurgo wrote the story concept to the mascots, and an animation was produced; Two stories have been created about the mascots: Out Of A Rainbow and Adventures On A Rainbow.

== Ticketing ==
Organisers estimated that some 8 million tickets would be available for the Olympic Games, and 1.5 million tickets for the Paralympic Games. It was estimated that 82% of available Olympic tickets and 63% of Paralympic tickets would be sold. LOCOG aimed to raise £375–£400 million in ticket sales. There were also free events such as marathon, triathlon and road cycling, although, for the first time in Olympic history, the sailing events were ticketed. To reduce congestion, ticket holders were entitled to free use of London's public transport network on the day of the event.

Following IOC rules, people applied for tickets from the NOC of their country of residence. European Union residents were able to apply for tickets in any EU country.

In Great Britain, ticket prices ranged from £20 for many events to £2,012 for the most expensive seats at the opening ceremony. Free tickets were given to military personnel, over 100.000 free tickets were given to schoolchildren and children were invited to win tickets. Free tickets were also given to the survivors and families of those who died during 7 July 2005 London bombings. Initially, people were able to apply for tickets via a website from 15 March 2011 until 26 April 2011. There was a huge demand for tickets, with 1.8 million people applying for 20 million tickets – three times the 6.6 million tickets available in the first round lot, with 95% of the applications from Great Britain. More than 50% of the sessions went to a random ballot, but over half the people who applied got no tickets as the process was widely criticised. On 11 May 2012 a round of nearly one million "second chance" tickets went on sale, with a second round of ticket sales for events that failed to sell out in the initial allocation. This took place over a 10-day period between 23 June and 3 July 2011, with priority given to those who were unsuccessful in the first allocation process. At this point there were about 1.7 million tickets available for football and 600,000 for other sports (including archery, hockey, football, judo, boxing and volleyball), with 1.5 million tickets priced between £20 and £50. Although technical difficulties were encountered, some events sold out in 15 minutes, and by 8 am, ten sports had sold out. People who were successful in the first round of tickets were allowed to buy more during the period 8–17 July 2011. By this point 1.5 million tickets were available for football and 8,000 for freestyle wrestling on a first-come-first-served basis. By 10 July all the tickets for volleyball had been sold, as 3.5 million tickets had been sold in total.

In Russia people bought "Olympic vouchers" which one would have to redeem in London during July and August 2012, with people making their own accommodation and travel arrangements. In Brazil, the ticket website and payment system did not work properly for the first three and a half days.

== Video games ==
Two video games were released to celebrate the 2012 Summer Olympics: Mario & Sonic at the London 2012 Olympic Games, and London 2012. Both are officially licensed by the International Olympic Committee.

== Corporate sponsorship ==
Sponsors of the 2012 Summer Olympics
Worldwide Olympic Partners
- Acer Inc.
- Atos
- Coca-Cola
- Dow Chemical Company
- General Electric
- McDonald's
- Omega SA
- Panasonic
- Procter & Gamble
- Samsung Electronics
- Visa Inc.
Partners
- Adidas
- BMW
- BP
- British Airways
- BT Group
- EDF Energy
- Lloyds TSB
Supporters
- Adecco
- ArcelorMittal
- Cadbury
- Cisco
- Deloitte
- Thomas Cook Group
- United Parcel Service
Suppliers and Providers
- Aggreko
- Airwave Solutions
- Atkins
- Boston Consulting Group
- CBS Outdoor
- Crystal CG
- Eurostar
- Freshfields Bruckhaus Deringer
- G4S
- General Mills (Nature Valley)
- GlaxoSmithKline
- Gymnova
- Heathrow Airport
- Heineken International
- Holiday Inn
- John Lewis
- McCann Worldgroup
- Mondo
- Next plc
- Nielsen Holdings
- Populous Holdings
- Rapiscan Systems
- Rio Tinto
- Technogym
- Thames Water
- Ticketmaster
- Trebor
- Westfield Group

The London Organising Committee of the Olympic and Paralympic Games (LOCOG) and the International Olympic Committee (IOC) had agreed sponsorship deals with companies (see table). The sponsors were assigned into one of four categories; worldwide, tier one, tier two and tier three. The companies cumulatively provided £1.4bn of funding, allocated evenly between the IOC and LOCOG.

Other sources estimated that sponsors provided about $957 million, rest estimated at ~ $3.9 billion would be provided by selling TV transmission rights(for the 4 years provided period). The total data for each company is not official presented, however with the sponsorship of companies not associated with the "health food" made the questions about it, and probably raised the part for contract renew.

== See also ==
- 2008 Summer Olympics marketing
- 2016 Summer Olympics marketing
- 2020 Summer Olympics marketing
