= 2016 Summer Olympics marketing =

Marketing campaign

2016 Summer Olympics marketing was a long-running campaign that began when Rio de Janeiro won its bid to host the games in 2009.

== Symbols ==
=== Emblem ===
The official emblem for the 2016 Summer Olympics was designed by the Brazilian agency Tatíl Design and unveiled on 31 December 2010, winning in a competition against 139 agencies. The logo represents three figures joined at their arms and feet, with the overall shape reflecting that of Sugarloaf Mountain. The emblem was also designed to have a three-dimensional form, which designer Fred Gelli claimed made it the "first 3D logo in the history of the Olympics."

The logo has been noted as evoking Henri Matisse's painting Dance. There were also allegations by the Colorado-based Telluride Foundation that the logo had been plagiarised from its own. While also consisting of several figures linked in motion, the Telluride Foundation logo contains four figures. This is not the first time that the foundation had alleged plagiarism of its logo by a Brazilian event; in 2004, the linked figures element had been copied for the logo of Carnival celebrations in Salvador. Gelli defended the allegations, stating that the concept of figures linked in embrace was not inherently original as it was "an ancient reference" and "in the collective unconscious". Gelli cited Dance as an influence of the logo's concept, and stated that the designers had intentionally aimed to make the interpretation of the concept as dissimilar to others as possible.

=== Slogan ===
The official slogan for the 2016 Summer Olympics was "A New World" (Portuguese: Um Mundo Novo). It was chosen to highlight the commitment of the Games organisers towards world peace, a united world, a better place to live, as well as a legacy for future generations through the hosting of the Olympic Games. This motto was chosen because this edition was the first to be held in South America.

=== Mascots ===
The official mascots of the 2016 Summer Olympics and Paralympics were unveiled on 24 November 2014. They were created by São Paulo-based animation company Birdo. The Olympic mascot Vinicius, named after musician Vinicius de Moraes, represents Brazilian wildlife and carries design traits of cats, monkeys, and birds. According to their fictional backgrounds, the mascots "were both born from the joy of Brazilians after it was announced that Rio would host the Games." Brand director Beth Lula stated that the mascots were intended to reflect the diversity of Brazil's culture and people. The names of the mascots were determined by a public vote whose results were announced on 14 December 2014; the names, which reference the co-writers of the song "The Girl from Ipanema", won over two other sets of names, tallying 44 percent of 323,327 votes. At the Olympic wrestling events, coaches were given plush dolls of Vinicius to throw into the ring when they wished to challenge a referee's call.

== Video games ==
Alongside with the Mario and Sonic series, Overwatch, a multiplayer first-person shooter game created by Blizzard Entertainment, ran an unofficial "Summer Games" event in August 2016 that ran concurrent with the 2016 Summer Olympics. The main event was a futuristic soccer game known as "Lúcioball", named for the playable hero Lúcio, who is depicted in the game's lore as a DJ and freedom fighter from Rio de Janeiro. Rio also serves as the location for the initial arena for Lúcioball, the Estádio das Rãs (Portuguese for "Stadium of Frogs", referencing Lúcio's logo).

== Virtual Reality ==
A basketball 360-degree video was produced in collaboration with Samsung and Two Bit Circus.

== Corporate sponsorship and advertising ==
=== Sponsors ===
Sponsors of the 2016 Summer Olympics
Worldwide Olympic Partners
- Atos
- Bridgestone
- Coca-Cola
- Dow Chemical Company
- General Electric
- McDonald's
- Omega SA
- Panasonic
- Procter & Gamble
- Samsung Electronics
- Visa Inc.
Official Sponsors
- América Móvil (Claro Americas, Embratel and NET)
- Banco Bradesco
- Bradesco Seguros
- Correios
- Nissan
Official Supporters
- 361 Degrees
- Aliansce Shopping Centers
- Cisco
- Ernst & Young
- Estácio S.A.
- Grupo Globo
- LATAM Airlines Group
- Sadia
- Skol
Official Suppliers
- 3Corações
- Airbnb
- C&A
- CTS Eventim
- Dica do Chef
- Editora Globo
- EF Education First
- Gas Natural
- GREE
- International Security & Defence Systems Brasil
- Kärcher
- Komeco
- Localiza
- ManpowerGroup
- Microsoft
- Mondo
- Nielsen Holdings
- Nike, Inc.
- RGS Events
- Rio de Janeiro–Galeão International Airport
- Sapore
- S. C. Johnson & Son (OFF!)
- SEG Gymnastics
- Symantec
- Technogym
Suppliers
- Bauerfeind
- Casa da Moeda do Brasil
- Dell Technologies (Dell EMC)
- Hospital dos Olhos Paulista
- Posterscope

== See also ==
- 2008 Summer Olympics marketing
- 2012 Summer Olympics marketing
- 2020 Summer Olympics marketing
- 2024 Summer Olympics marketing
