= Thimphu Athletics Track and Field Centre =

Athletics track in Thimphu, Bhutan

- Interactive map of Thimphu Athletics; Track and Field Centre
- Location: Thimphu, Bhutan
- Coordinates: 27°27′54.3″N 89°38′38.2″E

Construction
- Groundbreaking: 2010
- Opened: 2012

The Thimphu Athletics Track and Field Centre is an athletics track in Thimphu, Bhutan. It is the first synthetic athletics track in Bhutan.

== History ==
In 22 February 2012, the Thimphu Athletics Track and Field Centre, the first synthetic athletics track in Bhutan, was inaugurated. Athletics event for both men and women were held as part of the inauguration ceremony. The construction cost US$ 660 thousand and took two years to complete and was funded by the International Amateur Athletics Federation (IAAF), Olympic Council of Asia (OCA), and the International Olympic Committee (IOC).

== Facility ==
The facility hosts a synthetic athletics track which was provided by Italian firm Mondo. The athletics oval is situated more than 2,500 metres (8,200 ft) above sea level.
