= 2020 Summer Olympics marketing =

2020 Summer Olympics marketing was a long running campaign that began when Tokyo won its bid to host the games in 2013.

== Symbols ==
=== Emblem ===
Official emblems of the 2020 Summer Olympics and the Paralympics

The official emblems for the 2020 Olympics and Paralympics were unveiled on 25 April 2016; designed by Asao Tokolo, who won a nationwide design contest, it takes the form of a ring in an indigo-coloured checkerboard pattern. The design is meant to "express a refined elegance and sophistication that exemplifies Japan". The checkered design resembles a pattern called ichimatsu moyo that was popular during the Edo period in Japan from 1603 to 1867. The designs replaced a previous emblem which had been scrapped due to allegations that it plagiarized the logo of the Théâtre de Liège in Belgium.

=== Slogan ===
The Tokyo bid slogan was Discover Tomorrow (Japanese: 未来(あした)をつかもう, romanized: Ashita o tsukamō). While ashita literally means 'tomorrow', it is intentionally spelled as mirai 'future'.

The official slogan for the Tokyo 2020 Games, United By Emotion (Japanese: 感動による団結, romanized: Kando ni yoru danketsu), was unveiled on 17 February 2020.

=== Mascots ===
The Tokyo 2020 Organising Committee began accepting submissions for the official mascots of the Games from 1 to 14 August 2017. A total of 2,042 entries were received. Three shortlisted entries were unveiled at the Kakezuka Elementary School on 7 December 2017. A poll was then conducted between 11 December 2017 and 22 February 2018 to choose the winning entry, with each participating elementary school class allocated one vote. The results were announced on 28 February 2018. The winning entry was candidate pair A, created by Ryo Taniguchi, which received 109,041 votes, followed by Kana Yano's pair B with 61,423 votes and Sanae Akimoto's pair C with 35,291 votes. Miraitowa is a figure with blue checkered patterns inspired by the Games' official logo, which has old-fashioned charm and new innovation combined with a special power of instant teleportation. Both Miraitowa and Someity were named by the Organising Committee on 22 July 2018.

== Video games ==
Sega re-gained the rights to produce video games based on the Olympics, after the rights for 2018 were held by Ubisoft. Sega has developed officially licensed games for various platforms since the 2008 Summer Olympics, most notably the Mario & Sonic series.

At Sega Fest 2019, Sega announced they will be releasing four titles that will take place in the 2020 Olympics:

- Olympic Games Tokyo 2020 - The Official Video Game (for Nintendo Switch, Xbox One, PC and PlayStation 4)
- Mario & Sonic at the Olympic Games Tokyo 2020 (for Nintendo Switch)
- Mario & Sonic at the Olympic Games Tokyo 2020 - Arcade Edition (for Arcades)
- Sonic at the Olympic Games - Tokyo 2020 (for iOS and Android)

Mario & Sonic at the Olympic Games Tokyo 2020 on the Switch released on November 5, 2019, worldwide. Olympic Games Tokyo 2020 - The Official Video Game released on July 24, 2019, for PlayStation 4 and Nintendo Switch in East Asia, while the release date for the other territories is June 22. Sonic At The Olympic Games - Tokyo 2020 released for mobile devices on May 6, 2020. The arcade game came out in 2020.

In the Konami game, eBaseball Powerful Pro Yakyuu 2020, the game includes "Tokyo 2020 Olympics Mode" where players can play at the Fukushima Azuma Baseball Stadium and the Yokohama Stadium with Tokyo 2020 branding.

== Corporate sponsorship and advertising ==
As of 2015, total sponsorship for the 2020 Games reached approximately $1.3 billion, setting an Olympics record (the 2008 Summer Olympics in Beijing attracted $1.2 billion). Following the postponement of the Games, the organising committee released an advertisement titled "Tokyo 2020+1".

=== Sponsors ===
Sponsors of the 2020 Summer Olympics
Worldwide Olympic Partners
- Airbnb
- Alibaba Group
- Atos
- Bridgestone
- Coca-Cola
- Dow Chemical Company
- General Electric
- Intel
- Omega SA
- Panasonic
- Procter & Gamble
- Samsung Electronics
- Toyota
- Visa Inc.
Gold Partners
- Asahi Breweries
- Asics
- Canon Inc.
- Eneos Holdings
- Fujitsu
- Lixil Group
- Meiji Holdings
- Mitsui Fudosan
- Mizuho Financial Group
- NEC
- Nippon Life
- NTT Docomo
- Nomura Holdings
- Sumitomo Mitsui Banking Corporation
- Tokio Marine
Official Partners
- Airweave
- Ajinomoto
- All Nippon Airways
- ALSOK
- The Asahi Shimbun
- Cisco
- Dai Nippon Printing
- Daiwa House
- East Japan Railway Company
- Earth Corporation
- EF Education First
- Haneda Airport
- Hisamitsu Pharmaceutical
- Japan Airlines
- Japan Post Holdings
- JTB Corporation
- Kikkoman
- KT-CT Holdings
- Mainichi Shimbun
- Mitsubishi Electric
- Narita International Airport Corporation
- The Nikkei
- Nissin Foods
- Recruit Holdings
- Secom
- Tobu Top Tours
- Tokyo Gas
- Tokyo Metro
- Toppan
- Toto Ltd.
- Yamato Transport
- Yomiuri Shimbun
Official Supporters
- Aggreko
- AOKI Holdings
- Boston Consulting Group
- ECC
- Ernst & Young
- Google Japan
- Hokkaido Shimbun
- Kadokawa Future Publishing
- Kokuyo
- Marudai Foods
- Morisawa Inc.
- Nomura Kōgei
- Park24
- Pasona
- Sankei Shimbun
- Shimizu Corporation
- Tanaka Kikinzoku
- Technogym
- Tokyo Skytree
- Yahoo! Japan

== Songs and anthems ==
Like most Olympic Games has featured official songs for each sport event since 2021, the IOC and the Tokyo 2020 Organizing Committee chose songs for the 2020 Summer Olympics.

- (Japan) (United States) (South Korea) (South Africa) Colorful J-pop artists have been tapped for a new song called “Colorful,” the official song produced by Team Coca-Cola for the Tokyo 2020 Summer Olympics and Paralympic Games The following artists participated in the recording of the track celebrating diversity: Ai, Motohiro Hata, Little Glee Monster, Daichi Miura, Perfume, Taemin (SHINee), MIYAVI, Nasty C, Sabrina Carpenter, Ayumu Imazu, Blue Vintage, Mizki, Sanari, and Chikuzen Sato (Sing Like Talking).
- (Japan) Paprika (パプリカ) is a song by the children choral group Foorin. NHK invited Kenshi Yonezu to produce it as a cheer song for the 2020 Summer Olympics.
- (United Nations) Wave Your Flag is song the international global pop music group Now United.
- (South Korea) ASAP is a song recorded by South Korean girl group STAYC for their second single album Staydom.
- (Japan) Kite the Japanese boy band Arashi The song "Kite" served as the theme song for NHK's coverage of the 2020 Summer Olympics, including the special program "2020 Stadium" (2020スタジアム) hosted by the group.
- Naoki Satō composed the music for the medal ceremonies. Satō chose not to employ any musical elements distinctive to Japan "because victory ceremonies are for athletes from around the world" and he wanted all medalists to "feel at ease" when taking their places on the podium, regardless of their nationality.
- (Japan) (Spain) (United States) (South Africa) (New Zealand) (Germany) Imagine pre-recorded version of the song performed by John Legend, Keith Urban, Alejandro Sanz and Angélique Kidjo and Suginami Junior Chorus, with musical arrangement by Hans Zimmer, was featured in the opening ceremony for the 2020 Summer Olympics in Tokyo in July 23 2021.
- (Colombia) 200 Copas The colombian singer Karol G this new single 200 Copas.
- (South Korea) Dreamers The South Korean Boy Group Ateez released their first Japanese single, which serves as the fifth ending theme for the 2020 reboot anime series Digimon Adventure.

== See also ==
- 2008 Summer Olympics marketing
- 2012 Summer Olympics marketing
- 2016 Summer Olympics marketing
- 2024 Summer Olympics marketing
