= Gold Sands Beach =

Beach in Shandong, China

Coordinates: 35.954°N 120.243°E

Gold Sands Beach is located in the southern tip of the Shandong Peninsula of sea shore in Phoenix island Huangdao District of Qingdao. It is near Yellow Sea in the south. Its shape is like a crescent. Gold Sands Beach is more than 3,500 m (11,500 ft) long and 300 m (980 ft) wide. Because that the water is clear, the beach is flat, sand is like powder and the colour and lustre is as gold, it is named "Gold Sands Beach", which is the largest and most beautiful beach, known as "the first beach in Asia". In 2008, it is rated as the AAAA level scenic spot.

== Gold Sands Beach outdoor bathing place ==
Gold Sands Beach is stretching like a sickle-shaped moon. It is more than 3,500 m (11,500 ft) long. The sand is as gold and very soft. The sea water is clear, even can see the golden sand under the water. It has the most beautiful beach and waves. The waves, which lifted by sea breeze blown from the Yellow Sea, always rush into the beach in threes and fours, which makes the long and narrow more splendid. Gold Sands Beach has three gems: Sea cucumber, Abalone and Crab. They are big fat and high nutrition. It is said that you have a prolong life after eating. Whether this statement is accurate still waits for scientific appraisal. But one true thing is that the residents live around it are all longevous and people over 80 years old can be seen everywhere.

== The Golden Beach Cultural Tourism Festival ==
The Golden Beach Cultural Tourism Festival is the full name of the Golden Beach Qingdao cultural tourism festival in China. It uses the gold beach as the carrier and highlights the features of open, internationalism, fashion and mass. Then it highlights beach culture, marine culture and tourism fashion culture and put culture, economic and trade, sports and other plate activity in one body. By hosting the national scale and level activities, government tries to make the Golden Beach Cultural Tourism Festivals as the national-influenced and well-known festival activity. The Golden Beach Cultural Tourism Festival is developing and improving gradually. It not only becomes a cultural event which embodies development zone cultural quality, the opening consciousness and construction achievements, but also becomes Qingdao region famous brands festival activity. In every opening ceremony of the cultural tourism festival, many singers, hosts and chorus who are famous at home and abroad are invited.

=== "The Golden Beach Summer" cultural tourism weeks in 1998 ===
With the purpose of building up the brand sex culture activities and creating good social environment for development zone economic construction, the government of development zone ceremoniously rolled out "the Golden Beach summer" cultural tourism weeks from July seventeenth to twenty-second. It held 15 kinds of activities.

=== "The Golden Beach Summer" Cultural Tourism Festival in 1999 ===
In 1999, "the Golden Beach summer" cultural tourism weeks changed the name as "the Golden Beach Summer" Cultural Tourism Festival. It is held from August seventh to twelfth.

=== "The Golden Beach Summer" Cultural Tourism Festival in 2000 ===
It was held in administrative center business square from August eleventh to seventeenth.

=== The Golden Beach Cultural Tourism Festival in 2001 ===
This festival is officially called the Golden Beach Qingdao cultural tourism festival in China. It was held in gold beach performance square from 4–12 August. Experts and scholars, who enjoyed a high reputation both at home and abroad, such as Zhou Shulian and Yang Qixian, and showbiz stars such as Li Wen and Mao Amin came to beach. Besides, national athletes, model, journalists, etc. also entered into the beach. It was broadcast live for the first time to an important activity by Shandong TV.

=== The Golden Beach Cultural Tourism Festival in 2002 ===
It was held in gold beach performance square from August third to tenth. The opening ceremony corporated with Closed-circuit television(CCTV)society by exemplary, and invited many Taiwan's famous singers, Jiang Yuheng, and mainland's famous singers, such as Han Hong, Sun Yue, Yu Quan, Lin Yilun and so on.

=== The Golden Beach Cultural Tourism Festival in 2003 ===
It was held in gold beach performance square from August ninth to fifteenth. Because of the Severe acute respiratory syndrome(SARS), there were great changes in principle, activities content and organization operations. But it was still attracted more than 100,000 people.

=== The Golden Beach Cultural Tourism Festival in 2004 ===
It was held in QDETDZ from August seventh to thirteenth. It was with "investment promotion, pushing forward the development" as the theme, stood out the features of internationalism, academy, the characteristics of the mass. Hong Kong and Taiwan singers, Ren Xianqi, Liang Yongqi, Rong Zu'er, Tong An'ge, and mainland singers, Yin Xiumei, Ai Dai, Huang Zheng, Wang Rong, were dedicated cast. More than 300,000 people took part in the ceremony.

=== The Golden Beach Cultural Tourism Festival in 2005 ===
China · the Golden Beach Qingdao cultural tourism festival's most important activities plate-the covenant of xinghua· meeting in the phoenix island's large literary party were held in the Golden Beach, which made the whole city immerse in the happy festival atmosphere.

=== The Golden Beach Cultural Tourism Festival in 2006 ===
In the evening, the Golden Beach performance square of Qingdao development zone immersed in a joy and warm rich festival atmosphere in July fifteenth.

== The Golden Beach international football culture festival of Qingdao ==
It was an important part of the Golden Beach Cultural Tourism Festival in 2010. It made competitive as support, happy for fundamental key. Using the global popular carnival sports activities define traditional form, it promoted beach football which was the new sports to be a kind of lifestyle that relaxes body and mind. It gathered football fans from all over the world and invited The United States, Canada, France, South Korea, Japan and Beijing, Shanghai, Guangzhou, Qingdao and so on to attend. Furthermore, this program added beach football baby contest, which made the whole football culture festival content more lively and wonderful.
