= Aliansce Shopping Centers =

Brazilian company

Aliansce Sonae Shopping Centers S/A
- Type: Sociedade Anônima
- Traded as: B3: ALSC3
- Industry: Shopping malls
- Founded: 2004
- Defunct: 2019
- Successor: Alliances Sonae
- Headquarters: Rio de Janeiro, Brazil
- Key people: Renato Rique (chairman and CEO)
- Revenue: ▲US$ 227.0 million (2018)
- Net income: ▲US$ 30.7 million (2018)
- Website: www.aliansce.com.br

Aliansce Sonae was the second-largest shopping mall developer and management group in Brazil. It was founded in 2004 through a joint venture between the Brazilian company Nacional Iguatemi and American real estate group GGP. In August 2019, it merged with the manager Sonae Sierra Brasil, forming Alliances Sonae and becoming the largest manager of shopping centers in the country.

While in operation, the company was listed on B3 and had 40 shopping malls with approximately 1.4 million meters of gross leasable area (GLA).

== History ==
Aliansce was founded in 2004 through a joint venture between Nacional Iguatemi and GGP. GGP sold its interests in 2016.

In August 2019, it merged with Sonae Sierra Brasil to form Alliances Sonae, becoming the largest manager of shopping centers in the country.

Aliansce's portfolio included shopping centers located in all five Brazilian regions. Aliansce was also responsible for planning the Boulevard Shopping Campos.

After its merger to become Aliansce Sonae, it managed 12 third-party malls.
