= Keith Chen =

Chinese American behavioral economist

M. Keith Chen is a Chinese American behavioral economist. As of 2020, he is a tenured professor of economics at UCLA's Anderson School of Management.

Chen holds a Ph.D. in economics from Harvard University (2003). From 2003 to 2008 he was an assistant professor of economics at the Yale School of Management, and an associate professor there from 2008 until he transferred to UCLA in 2013 as associate professor.

Chen's research focuses on applied microeconomic theory. His Whorfian hypothesis on how languages might affect behavior has received attention outside academia.

He is married to Elisa Long, associate professor of operations management at UCLA.

== Select publications ==
- with Elisa Long and Ryne Rhola (2020), "Political Storms: Emergent Partisan Skepticism of Hurricane Risks" (PDF), Science Advances, 6 (37) eabb7906, Bibcode:2020SciA....6.7906L, doi:10.1126/sciadv.abb7906, PMC 7486090, PMID 32917709, S2CID 221616983
- The Effect of Language on Economic Behavior: Evidence from Savings Rates, Health Behaviors, and Retirement Assets (PDF), American Economic Review, 2013
- Are Women Overinvesting in Education? Evidence from the Medical Profession (PDF), Journal of Human Capital, 2012
