= Erke (brand) =

Sportswear brand owned by the Chinese company HongXing Erke Group

Hongxing Erke Sports Goods Co., Ltd.
- Industry: Sports equipment
- Founded: 2000; 26 years ago
- Headquarters: Quanzhou, Fujian, China
- Area served: Southeast Asia, Middle East
- Products: Footwear, sportswear
- Revenue: Annual Turnover US$ > 250,000,000
- Website: en.erke.com

Erke
- Simplified Chinese: 尔克
- Traditional Chinese: 爾克
Transcriptions
Standard Mandarin
- Hanyu Pinyin: Ěrkè

ERKE is a sportswear brand owned by the Chinese company HongXing Erke Group. The brand specializes in footwear and sportswear and has sponsored major sports icons within the Chinese Olympic team. Erke was also the official kit sponsor for the Korea DPR national football team.

Erke was also the official apparel sponsor for the 2012 WTA Tour Championships and Shanghai ATP 1000 tennis tournament, and the Qatar Open table tennis tournament.

It was reported that Hongxing Erke's revenue in 2020 would be 2.8 billion, and its net profit would be a loss of 220 million.

== Sponsorship ==
=== Olympic Committees ===
- Croatia

=== Football ===
- (Singapore) Gombak United FC

=== Tennis ===
==== Players ====
- (Belgium) Yanina Wickmayer
- (Germany) Andreas Beck
- (Germany) Benjamin Becker
- (Germany) Philipp Petzschner
- (Germany) Mischa Zverev
- (Spain) Tommy Robredo
- (United States) Vania King

==== Teams ====
- Germany Fed Cup team
