= Li Yugang =

Chinese singer

Li Yugang 李玉刚
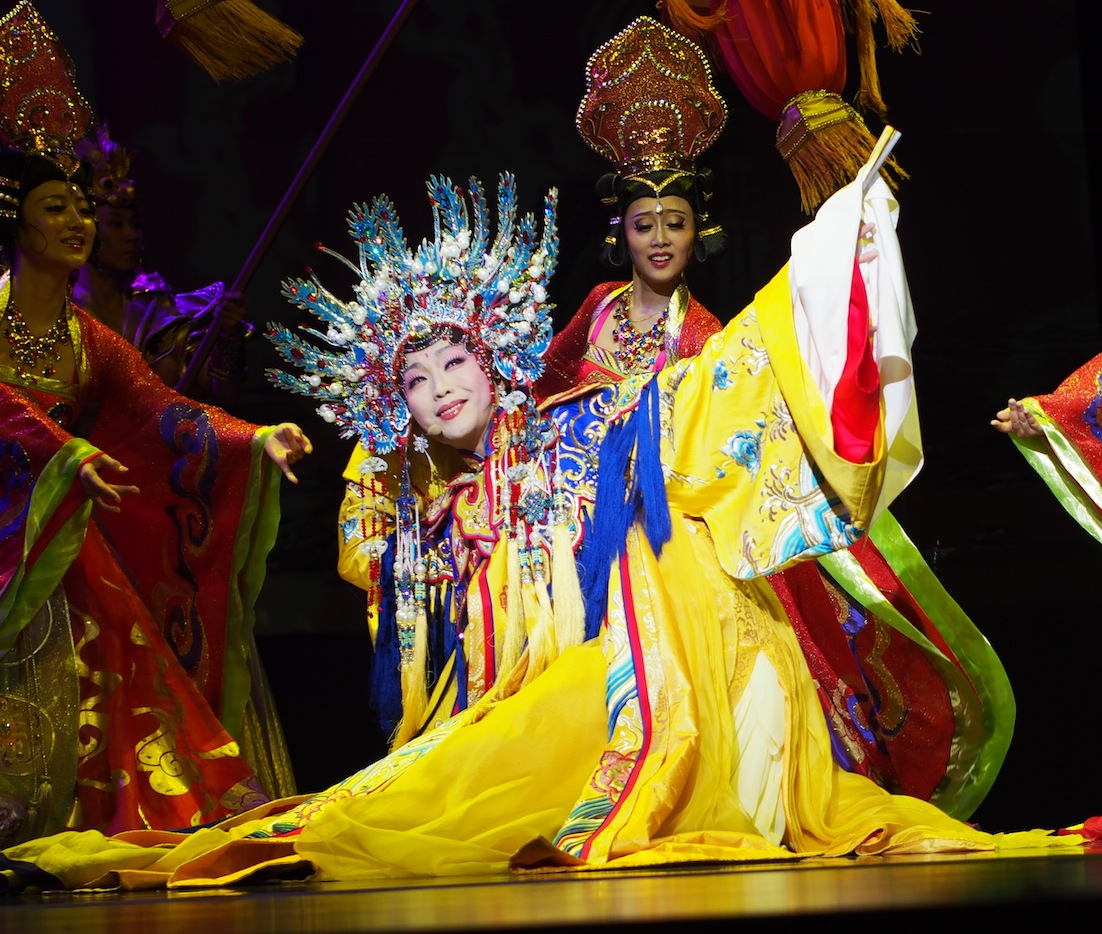
- Yang Guifei in "Portrait of Four Beauties.(2011)

Background information
- Also known as: Mr. Yu (玉先生)
- Born: Li Gang (李刚); July 23, 1978 (age 48); Gongzhuling, Jilin, China
- Genres: Beijing opera; Mandopop
- Occupations: Singer, stage actor
- Instrument: Vocals
- Years active: 2006–present
- Label: Jade (玉泽东方)
- Website: https://weibo.com/n/李玉刚

Chinese name
- Traditional Chinese: 李玉剛
- Simplified Chinese: 李玉刚
Transcriptions
Standard Mandarin
- Hanyu Pinyin: Lǐ Yùgāng

Li Yugang (Chinese: 李玉刚; pinyin: Lǐ Yùgāng; born July 23, 1978) is a Chinese singer, artist, and soloist with the China National Opera & Dance Drama Theater. A National First-Class Actor, he specialises in nándàn (男旦) roles, male performances of female parts, in Peking opera.

Born into a farming family in Jilin province, Li was unable to attend college and worked various jobs before becoming a club singer in Xi'an. It was there that his ability to sing in both male and female registers was discovered when he filled in for an absent colleague. Li rose to prominence in 2006 after placing third on the talent show Star Boulevard and has since released music, performed internationally, and expanded into writing, cultural promotion, and filmmaking.

== Early life ==
Born in 1978 to a farming family in Jilin, Li was accepted into the provincial Art College but could not attend due to financial constraints. Following high school, he held various jobs in Changchun before moving to Xi'an to work as a waiter in an entertainment club.

Soon, he was allowed to sing a few songs and became a club singer. His breakthrough came when a female colleague didn't show up and he had to take her place, singing in a female voice. "That's how I started with female roles," recalled Li Yugang. The ability to perform in both male and female vocal ranges led to a full-time position. From 1998 to 2006, Li trained professionally to develop skills in nándàn, the traditional Peking opera practice of men portraying female characters.

== Career ==
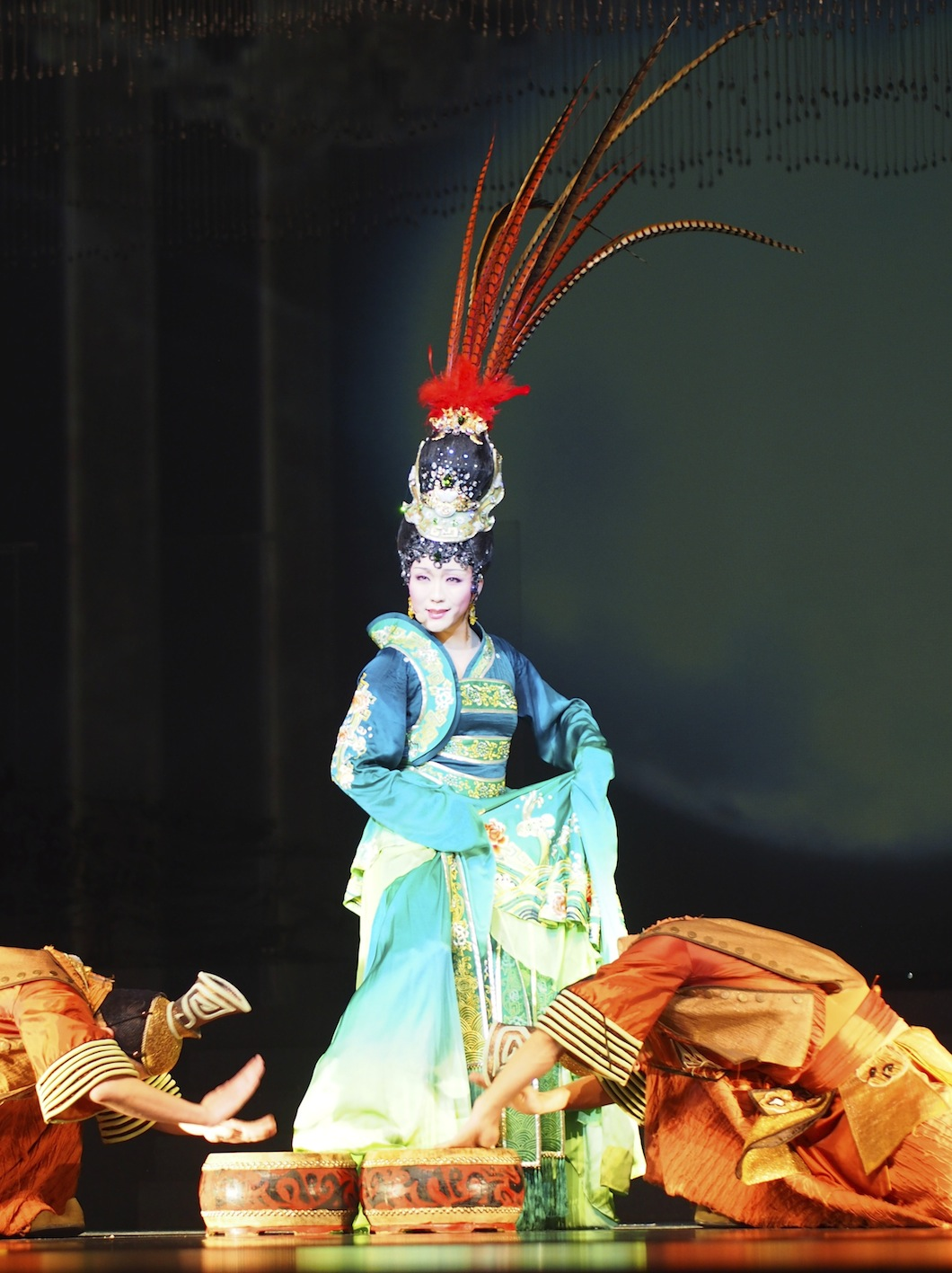
Diao Chan in "Portrait of Four Beauties

=== Early years ===
In 2006, Li rose to prominence after placing third on Star Boulevard (星光大道), a national talent competition on CCTV. His performances of "Farewell My Concubine" (霸王别姬) and "The Drunken Beauty" (贵妃醉酒), both from the Peking Opera repertoire, gained him significant public attention.

The following year, Li gave his first solo performance in Beijing, titled "Where Flowers are Unbounded" (凡花无界). In April 2008, he performed at the "2008 United Nations Spring Cultural Festival" at the United Nations Headquarters in New York. In 2009, he joined the China National Opera & Dance Drama Theater and was awarded the title of National First-Class Actor. That same year, Li performed at the Sydney Opera House, becoming the second Chinese artist to do so, and was awarded the Southern Cross Gold Prize for Culture by the Australian Government.

=== Stage ===
In 2010 and 2011, Li developed the stage productions "Flower in Mirror, Moon in Water" (镜花水月) and "The Painting of Four Beauties" (四美图), respectively, performing over 100 shows domestically and internationally. In 2015, he directed and starred in "Lady Zhaojun" (昭君出塞), an Oriental Poetic Stage production that took three years to prepare. It premiered in Beijing from 16–19 April 2015.

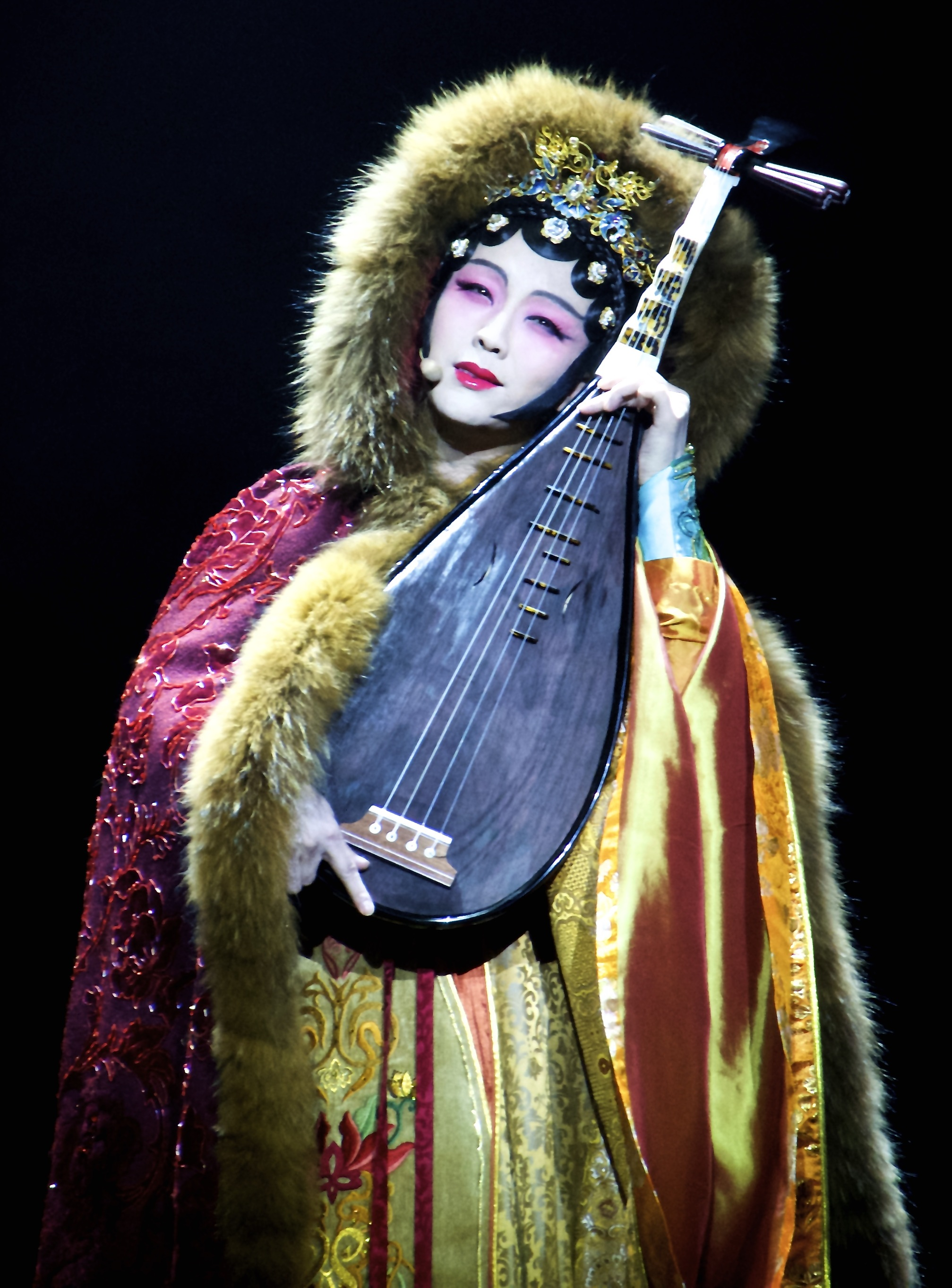
Li Yugang in the premiere of "Lady Zhaojun"

A new musical adaptation of "Lady Zhaojun" premiered at the Beijing Tianqiao Performing Arts Center on 26 April 2019, followed by a global tour in June. By 8 December 2019, the production had completed 46 performances. Following a hiatus, the tour was scheduled to resume in 2023.

=== Music ===
In 2010, Li Yugang released his debut album "The New Drunken Beauty" (新贵妃醉酒), and then released "Dream-chasing Chant" (逐梦令) and "Lotus" (莲花). In 2014, the Rhymoi Music company released Li Yugang's "Once Upon a Time in Shanghai" (民国旧梦) CD album.

On 10 November 2016, the single "Happened to meet you" (剛好遇見你) was released for the 10th anniversary of his debut and the self-titled album was released in 2017. "Happened to meet you" stayed on the music charts for 10 weeks, and the music video for the song reached over 100 million views on YouTube. After that, he started the tour of "Li Yugang's 10-year Classic Concert" (李玉剛十年經典演唱會) on 17 Dec. 2016.

By now(2023), Li Yugang has released nearly a hundred singles, mainly in Chinese style. He has also blended variety styles like R&B, rap and electronic elements into his music.

=== Cross-Border ===
In addition to being a stage actor and singer, Li Yugang has also branched out into writing, planning and holding cultural gatherings, promotion of ceramic culture, and film director.

In November 2016, his first literary work "The beauty I met" (玉見之美) which recorded his pilgrimage to China's intangible cultural heritage with words and pictures was published. At the end of 2016, Li 's art space "Jade Space" (玉空間) was completed in Beijing, extending his love and obsession with traditional culture from stage art to life aesthetics. In May 2021, after the "Jade Space" in Beijing and Suzhou, Li Yugang's porcelain culture-themed art space - "Jade Workshop" (玉工坊) was unveiled in Jingdezhen, Jiangxi Province.

In 2019, the short film "A Date After Twilight", Li directed and starred, was set as the opening film of the 86358 Short Film Exchange Week hosted by Jia Zhangke Art Center. On 30 March 2023, Li has begun filming his feature directorial debut "Nostalgia in the Cloud" (雲上的雲).

== Stage works ==
- 2010 "Flower in Mirror, Moon in Water" (镜花水月)
- 2011 "The Painting of Four Beauties" (四美图)
- 2012 "The new Flower in Mirror, Moon in Water" (新镜花水月)
- 2019 "Lady Zhaojun" (昭君出塞)

== Director's works ==
Year	Title	English Title	Credited as	Type
2023	雲上的雲	Nostalgia In The Clouds	Director, Writer, Actor	Feature film
2019	人約黃昏後	A Date After Twilight	Director, Actor	Short film
2017	般若號角	Prajna Horn	Director, Actor	Musical
2015	昭君出塞	Lady Zhaojun	Director, Actor	Musical

== Discography ==
=== Singles ===
2024
Date	Title	Eng. Title
2024-02-05	長春	Chang-Chun

2023
Date	Title	Eng. Title
2023-09-29	九州	Nine Provinces
2023-09-27	絶色江西	Stunning Jiangxi
2023-06-09	刻木成香	Memories of Woodcarving
2023-03-31	刚好遇见你 - 长安幻想	Happened to Meet You - Chang'an Fantasy
2023-01-20	豫見	*Encounter Henan
2023-01-01	山河一脈	*China

2022
Date	Title	Eng. Title
2022-12-22	暖暖	Warm
2022-12-19	故人酒	Wine for Old Friends
2022-09-17	心憂天下	Worried about the World
2022-09-12	賦得古原草送別	Ode to Farewell in the Ancient Grassland
2022-09-02	阿里郎回故鄉	*Arirang
2022-08-17	鷓鴣天杯滄海	Partridge Sky
2022-06-08	瓷語	Porcelain's Talk
2022-06-03	四方明月	Moonlight Everywhere
2022-05-21	繞	Winding
2022-04-28	誅仙忘塵	ZhuXian - Forget the Mundane World
2022-04-27	把酒問月	Ask the Moon With a Cup of Wine in Hand
2022-04-22	姑蘇	Gu-Su
2022-04-04	清明客	Missing my hometown on Qingming Festival
2022-03-05	新霸王別姬	New Farewell My Concubine
2022-02-21	羽生	Feather Falls for Rebirth
2022-01-27	世界飛馳吧	*Fly Me to the World
2022-01-22	窗花	Paper-cut for Window Decoration
2022-01-21	青城不老	*Qing-Cheng
2022-01-15	華夏	Hua-Xia
2022-01-01	長安行	Changan Trip

2021
Date	Title	Eng. Title
2021-12-15	追風趕月的你	You who Chase the Wind and the Moon
2021-11-25	定風波	Calming the Storm
2021-11-23	東方不敗	*Swordsman
2021-11-22	經山海	Traveling through The Classic of Mountains and Seas
2021-10-31	俠客行	Ode to Gallantry
2021-09-25	水調歌頭·遊覽	Prelude To Water Melody-Tour
2021-09-17	天下大足	Da-zu
2021-09-12	赤伶(交響樂版)	The Red Actors(Symphony Edition)
2021-08-26	一場煙雨	*Misty Rain
2021-08-07	一剪梅	*A Spray of Plum Blossoms
2021-07-03	畫眸	Painting Eyes
2021-07-01	記號	Sign
2021-06-09	歸夢長	Homecoming Dream
2021-05-04	萬疆	Vast Territory
2021-04-08	將軍嘆	General's Sigh

2020
Date	Title	Eng. Title
2020-12-11	霓裳飛花	Rainbow Skirts Flying Flowers
2020-12-08	古都風色	*Ancient Densing
2020-11-27	一念拂曉	Dawning in a Moment
2020-11-02	茉莉茶歌	The Song of Jasmine Tea
2020-10-21	滿弦	Full Moon
2020-10-03	月半望雲山	Look Over the Cloud-covered Mountains with a Full Moon
2020-09-24	紅昭愿	Zhaojun's Wishes
2020-09-11	花木蘭	*Mulan
2020-08-08	遇見桑羅	Meet SANGLUO
2020-07-31	黍離	Lush Broomcorn Millet
2020-07-18	昭君出塞	Zhaojun Goes Out of The Frontier
2020-06-29	無塵	Out of the World
2020-06-17	白首	*Growing Old Together
2020-06-17	赤伶	The Red Actors
2020-05-14	將進酒	Invitation to Wine
2020-05-06	落緣	Lost Fate
2020-04-18	清明上河圖	Along the River During the Qingming Festival
2020-04-17	善念起	Right Mindfulness Arise

2019
Date	Title	Eng. Title
2019-12-20	七子新歌	*New Song of Seven Sons
2019-10-27	夢回誅仙	Dream back to ZhuXian
2019-09-08	浮雲散	Floating Clouds Parted
2019-07-23	長春	*Chang-Chun
2019-05-08	我只在乎你	*I Only Care About You
2019-04-06	和項王歌	Ode to Emperor Xiang
2019-02-19	梨花頌	Ode to Pear Blossoms
2019-01-24	傳人	Heirs

2018
Date	Title	Eng. Title
2018-12-21	月兒彎彎	*Curvy Moon
2018-11-29	夜將至	*Nightfall
2018-11-28	蝶戀	Butterfly Love
2018-10-31	遇見旗袍	*Meet Cheongsam
2018-09-24	我一直在這裏	*I've Been Here
2018-06-02	菩提	Bodhi
2018-05-26	陌上風雅	Field Elegance
2018-04-18	花魁	Oiran
2018-04-09	如初	As Beginning
2018-04-03	寶頂之巔	Top of Bao-Ding Mountain
2018-02-27	獨孤天下	*The Legent of Du-gu

2012-2017
Date	Title	Eng. Title
2017-11-03	天地有靈	Animism
2016-12-10	天池南	South of Heaven Lake
2016-01-19	國色天香(對唱版)	National Beauty (Duet Version)
2015-02-12	李	Li
2015-01-19	再見，貝兒	Farewell, Bei-Er
2014-01-24	國色天香	National Beauty
2014-01-22	日日紅上海	Shanghai Memory
2014-01-22	于是探戈	Let's Tango
2014-01-22	與天使同在	Be with angels
2012-02-28	雨花石	Yuhua Stone

(English titles with "*" are from the official.)

=== Studio albums ===
Date	Title	Literal English Translation
2021-09-15	《李玉剛合輯》	Li Yugang Compilation
2021-08-26	《李玉剛懷舊集》	Li Yugang Nostalgic Collection
2017-04-05	《剛好遇見你》	Happened to Meet You
2014-12-04	《蓮花》	The Lotus
2014-11-11	《民國舊夢》	Once upon A Time in Shanghai
2011-12-15	《逐夢令》	Dream-chasing Chant
2010-12-28	《新貴妃醉酒》	The New Drunken Beauty (Drunken Concubine)
2010-12-22	《嫦娥奔月》	Chang’e Flying to the Moon
2010-01-01	《遊園驚夢》	Startling Dream (Peony Pavilion)

=== EP ===
Date	Title	Literal English Translation
2022-11-04	《追風趕月的你》	You who Chase the Wind and the Moon
2021-08-10	《四美圖》	The Painting of Four Beauties
2018-11-07	《禪意三部曲》	*Buddhist Mood Trilogy
2015-02-13	《李》	Li

=== Live album of Musical ===
Date	Title	Literal English Translation
2012-12-26	《新镜花水月》2012全国巡演原声大碟	"New Flower in Mirror, Moon in Water" 2012 National Tour Original Soundtrack (CD)
2011-12-15	《四美圖》國家大劇院首演實況DVD	"The Painting of Four Beauties" Live DVD Premiere at the National Center for the Performing Arts
2011-05-23	《鏡花水月》李玉剛新春演歌會	" Flower in Mirror, Moon in Water" Chinese New Year Concert (DVD)
2011-05-03	《镜花水月》演歌會原聲大碟	"Flower in Mirror, Moon in Water" Concert Original Soundtrack (CD)
2011-04-20	《鏡花水月》2010全球巡演日本演歌會	"Flower in Mirror, Moon in Water" 2010 World Tour in Japan (DVD)
