= Tobu Top Tours =

Travel and holiday companies of Japan

Tobu Top Tours Corporation (東武トップツアーズ株式会社) TTA, INC. TopTour Europe
- Type: Corporation
- Industry: Travel agency
- Founded: Tokyo, Japan (1 March 1956)
- Headquarters: Sumida-ku, Tokyo, Japan
- Area served: East Asia, United States, United Kingdom, Europe, Australia
- Key people: Nobuaki Sakamaki, President; Mikio Miura, President (TTA, Inc.)
- Number of employees: 2,280 (2015); 46 (2016) (TTA, Inc.)
- Website: Tobu Top Tours

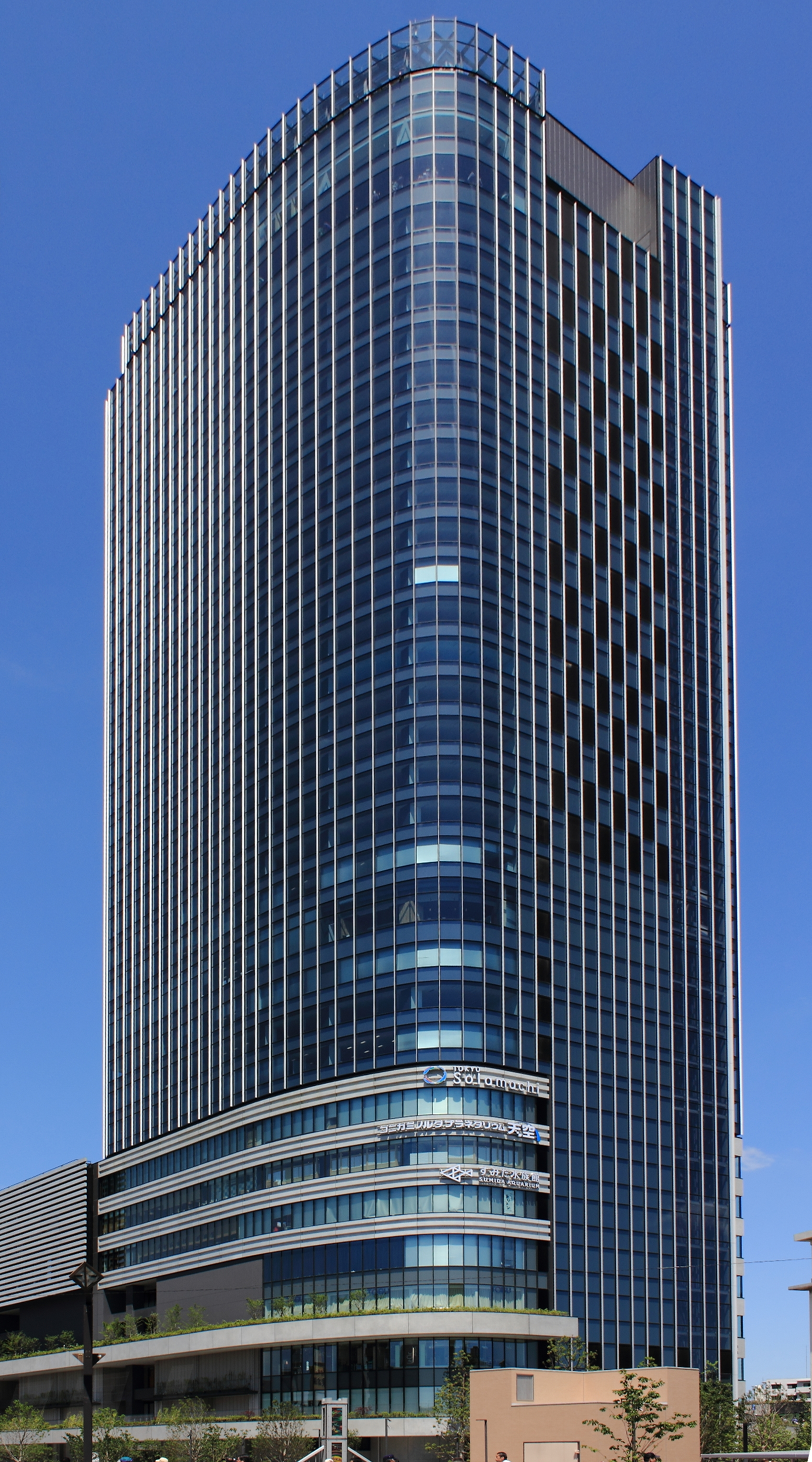
Tokyo Skytree East Tower

Tobu Top Tours Corporation (東武トップツアーズ株式会社, Tōbu Toppu Tsuāzu Kabushiki Gaisha) is a travel agency located in Sumida-ku, Tokyo, Japan, and a part of Tobu Group. Its old name was Tokyu Tourist Corporation (東急観光株式会社 Tōkyū Kankō Kabushiki Gaisha) a part of Tokyu Group before it became independent from it in 2004. In 2006, the company renamed to TopTour Corporation (トップツアー株式会社 Topputsuā Kabushiki Gaisha). has over 100 branches in Japan, and offices in London, Paris, New York, San Francisco, Los Angeles, Hawaii, Guam, Sydney, Gold Coast (Australia), Bangkok, Hong Kong, Shanghai, Beijing, and Singapore. On April 1, 2015, merged with Tobu Travel Co., Ltd. (東武トラベル株式会社 Tōbu Toraberu Kabushiki Gaisha), renamed to Tobu Top Tours Corporation, and head office moved to Tokyo Skytree East Tower.

== Services ==
Tobu Top Tours, along with its subsidiary companies TTA, Inc. and Top Tour Europe Limited, primarily offer both leisure and corporate travel worldwide, with a concentration in East Asia, Europe, and the United States. Tobu Top Tours offers activities such as project proposal, planning and management of international and domestic meetings and conferences, as well as the planning and management of expositions, anniversary events, sports events and lectures. The company also specializes in organization of and consulting on seminars relating to travel, tourism, and culture, planning, design, and consulting relating to development of tourist destinations. It also offers business relating to advertising and publicity, leasing and management of real estate, non life insurance agency and life insurance subscriptions, temporary staffing services, computer-based information processing and information delivery services, language interpreting and translation, and ticket booking agencies.

=== Travel ===
Both the subsidiaries and parent company operating under Tobu Top Tours offer a wide variety of incentive packages for both leisure and corporate travel, as well as organized short and day travel tours for individuals and large groups. Additionally, Tobu Top Tours, TTA, Inc. and Top Tours Europe are all authorized sellers and distributors of Japan Rail Passes, more commonly known as a JR Pass.

== History ==
=== 1949-2015 ===
Prior to the April 2015 Merger, Top Tours and Tobu Travel Company existed as two separate entities operating within separate special wards of Tokyo, Japan. Top Tours was founded as Tokyu Tourist Corporation (東急観光株式会社, Tōkyū Kankō Kabushiki Gaisha) in Shibuya-ku, in January 1958, with Tobu Travel Company being founded under the name of Zen Nihon Kanko Co., LTD (禅日本観光株式会社, Zen Nihon Kankō Kabushiki Gaisha) in the neighboring ward of Minato-ku in December 1949. During the 1970s, both companies underwent separate mergers, with Tokyu Tourist Corporation merging with Tokyu Travel Service Co. in April 1972, LTD and Zen Nihon Kanko Co., LTD. merging with Tobu Tetsudo Kanko in July 1971 after changing their name to Tobu Travel Company, LTD in April of that year. On the 50th Anniversary of the 2006, Top Tours changed its name to TopTour Corporation, and went under the umbrella of the Tobu Group in August 2013. The two companies merged on April 1, 2015.

=== 2015 Merger-Present ===
On April 1, 2015, Tobu Travel Company and Top Tours merged under the Tobu Group. The company is currently operating under Tobu Top Tours. As of 2015, there are over 100 active offices within Japan, with 2,280 active employees. The company is valued at an estimate of ¥3,000,000,000 (Capital). In June 2015, the office headquarters relocated to the Tokyo Skytree East Tower. Tobu Top Tours holds memberships with the Japan Association of Travel Agents, Japan Association of Travel Agents Compensation Security Bond System, Travel Agency Fair Trade Council, PATA, ASTA, and UFTAA.

== Expansion ==
Tobu Top Tours currently holds offices outside of Japan in the United States, Europe, Australia, and China. Expansion of the company began in December 1964 with the founding of Tokyu Travel Service Inc. in Los Angeles, California. In July 1986, another overseas branch, Tokyu Travel Europe Ltd., was established in the United Kingdom. Since the 2015 merger, the companies have been renamed Top Tour America, Inc. (TTA, Inc.) and Top Tour Europe Limited (TTE), respectively. TTA, Inc.'s headquarters relocated from Los Angeles to Torrance, California in 2001, and TTE's headquarters are in London, England. Both TTA, Inc. and TTE are independent subsidiary companies of Tobu Top Tours.

=== TopTour America ===
TopTour's branches in the United States are referred to as TopTour America, Incorporated founded January 1, 1964. It is commonly referred to as TTA, Inc. TTA, Inc. has four offices: Los Angeles, San Francisco, New York City, and Honolulu. The Los Angeles office serves as the American headquarters. While New York, Los Angeles, and San Francisco offices handle both inbound and outbound travel and act as a destination management company and full-service travel management company, Honolulu currently services US inbound travel only. TopTour America offers group tours, incentive tours, flights, and hotels for travel around the world, mainly in organizing meetings and conference exhibitions arrangements in East Asia, including Japan, China, South Korea, Cambodia and Vietnam.

=== TopTour Europe ===
TopTour has a branch in London and Paris under name TopTour Europe Limited which was founded in 1986. TopTour Europe offers similar services to TopTour America, with inbound and outbound travel mostly originating and terminating in European countries.
