= Royale Furniture Holdings =

Chinese furniture manufacturer and wholesaler

Royale Furniture Holdings Limited 皇朝傢俬控股有限公司
- Type: Public limited company(SEHK: 1198)
- Industry: Furniture
- Founded: 1997
- Headquarters: Hong Kong, People's Republic of China
- Area served: People's Republic of China
- Key people: Mr. Tse Kam Pang (Chairman); Ma Gary Ming Fai (Chief executive officer); Zeng Le Jin; Lam Toi
- Number of employees: 3,800
- Website: www.hkroyal.com

Royale Furniture Holdings Limited (Chinese: 皇朝傢俬控股有限公司) (SEHK: 1198) is one of the largest furniture manufacturers and wholesalers in China. It offers its furniture products in "Shunde Empire Furniture" in Shunde, Guangdong, the biggest furniture wholesale market in China.

== History ==
The company was founded in 1997. It was formerly known as Chitaly Holdings Limited and changed its name to the current name in 2007. It is headquartered in Hong Kong and Shunde.
