= Lingdian =

Chinese rock band

Zero Band (Chinese: 零点乐队; pinyin: Lingdian Yuedui) is a Chinese rock band from Inner Mongolia. The lead singer is Zhou Xiaoou (周晓鸥). The English name "Zero Band" was used in Beijing concert advertisements, though the band did not originally use an English name; the name has also been translated as "Point Zero" in some older English publications. The band appeared on the Jingwen label in China, but was licensed outside China by JVC. One of the top Beijing bands at the end of the 1990s, Lingdian originally suffered the same resistance from government-owned venues as other indigenous PRC rock bands.

Lead singer Zhou Xiaoou announced that he was retiring from the band in 2008, following his acting role in the TV series Struggle (2007), leading the media, such as Xinhuanet, to conclude that the band had broken up.

== Albums ==
- Bie wuhui 别误会 1996
- 永恒的起点
- 每一夜每一天
- 00：00：00
- 没有什么不可以
- 越来越
- 风·雷·动
