= Vatti =

Chinese kitchen appliance company

- Traded as: SZSE: 002035
- Industry: Kitchen appliances
- Founded: 1992; 34 years ago
- Headquarters: Zhongshan, Guangdong, China
- Area served: Worldwide
- Website: vatti.com.cn vattimalaysia.com

Vatti is a Chinese company which manufactures kitchen appliances. Founded in 1992. It manufactures gas hobs, water heaters and extractor fans.
