= Chris Yu =

Taiwanese singer and songwriter

- Born: October 30, 1968 (age 57); Taipei, Taiwan
- Education: Lien Ho Junior College of Technology
- Occupations: Singer, songwriter, television personality
- Years active: 1989—present
- Spouse: Huang Yu-hsiu (m. 1997)
- Children: 2

Chinese name
- Traditional Chinese: 游鴻明
- Simplified Chinese: 游鸿明
Transcriptions
Standard Mandarin
- Hanyu Pinyin: Yóu Hóngmíng
- Musical career
- Also known as: Yu Hong-ming; You Hongming
- Genres: Mandopop
- Instruments: Vocals, guitar

Chris Yu (Chinese: 游鴻明; born October 30, 1968) is a Taiwanese singer and songwriter.

Known for his ballads, Yu has written for several pop music artists, including Alan Tam, Andy Lau, Stefanie Sun, Sammi Cheng, Coco Lee, and Cass Phang.

His 2002 release Falling in Love with Chris Yu 2002 Love Song was one of the best-selling albums of the year in Taiwan.

In 2010, Yu became a judge on the seventh season of One Million Star. He was also a judge on the third season of Million Star, which aired in 2013.

== Discography ==
=== Studio albums ===
Title	Album details
Deng Bu Ji Yao Dui Ni Shuo 等不及要對妳說	Released: November 1993; Label: Kolin Records; Formats: CD, digital download
Lian Shang Yi Ge Ren 戀上一個人	Released: September 1994; Label: Kolin Records; Formats: CD, digital download
Love Once Hurt Once 愛一回傷一回	Released: July 1995; Label: Power Promotion; Formats: CD, digital download
Kuang Bei Kuang Xi 狂悲狂喜	Released: May 1996; Label: Power Promotion; Formats: CD, digital download
Confused Missing 受困思念	Released: April 5, 1997; Label: Music Impact Entertainment; Formats: CD, digital download
Snow in May 五月的雪	Released: April 15, 1999; Label: Cosmo Music; Formats: CD, digital download
Sanding 下沙	Released: September 2000; Label: Cosmo Music; Formats: CD, digital download
Subway 地下鐵	Released: August 2001; Label: Sony Music Taiwan; Formats: CD, digital download
2003 Heart Felt Self-Composed-Lonesome Space In Taipei 台北寂寞部屋 2003心情歌創作	Released: May 2, 2003; Label: Sony Music Taiwan; Formats: CD, digital download
Autumn Love Songs 2004 - The First Thousand Days 2004秋季戀歌-第一千個晝夜	Released: October 14, 2004; Label: Sony Music Taiwan; Formats: CD, digital download
The Poet's Tears 詩人的眼淚	Released: March 17, 2006; Label: Sony Music Taiwan; Formats: CD, digital download
The Tired Birds 倦鳥餘花	Released: November 26, 2007; Label: Skyhigh Entertainment; Formats: CD, digital download
Nothing About Love 與愛情無關	Released: July 2, 2009; Label: Hove Entertainment; Formats: CD, digital download
These Days 最近的游鴻明	Released: April 24, 2015; Label: Sony Music Taiwan; Formats: CD, digital download

=== Extended plays ===
Title	Album details
Everyone Is Changing 每個人都在變	Released: December 29, 2011; Label: Hove Entertainment; Formats: CD, digital download

=== Compilation albums ===
Title	Album details
Love You One Day More 一天一萬年 - 創作精選	Released: February 21, 1998; Label: Music Impact Entertainment; Formats: CD, digital download
33 Chris Yu Best Collection 33 游鴻明	Released: June 2001; Label: BMG Taiwan; Formats: CD, digital download
Falling in Love with Chris Yu 2002 Love Song Collection 戀上游鴻明 2002情歌創作精選集	Released: March 15, 2002; Label: Sony Music Taiwan; Formats: CD, digital download
2006 The Best Chris Yu 游式情歌 1993-2006經典全紀錄	Released: November 2006; Label: Sony Music Taiwan; Formats: CD, digital download
The Golden Love Songs of Chris Yu 2008 2008情歌金選最終回 新歌+精選 終極情歌	Released: February 1, 2008; Label: Sony BMG Taiwan; Formats: CD, digital download
Best Love Songs Of Julia Peng V.S Chris Yu 彭游戀歌 最愛精選	Released: May 20, 2008; Label: Sony BMG Taiwan; Formats: CD, digital download

=== Singles ===
Year	Title	Notes
1999	"We Still Have Fishes Here" ("我們這裡還有魚")	Collaboration with Nicholas Tse, China Huang and David Wong
2000	"Intimate Talk" ("談心")	Collaboration with Joi Chua
2001	"Stray Dog" ("流浪狗")	
2008	"Conquer" ("征服")	Collaboration with Fan Ren
2008	"Curved Rainbow" ("彩虹彎彎")	Collaboration with Peter Ho

== Filmography ==
=== Television ===
Year	English title	Original title	Notes
2010	One Million Star Season 7	超級星光大道7	Judge
2013	Million Star Season 3	華人星光大道3	Judge

== Awards and nominations ==
Year	Award	Category	Nominated work	Result
1998	9th Golden Melody Awards	Best Composer	"Loving Me"	Nominated
2002	2nd Global Chinese Music Awards	Best Album	2003 Heart Felt Self-Composed-Lonesome Space In Taipei	Won
2002	2002 Hito Music Awards	Top 10 Songs	" In Love With The Other"	Won
2003	3rd Global Chinese Music Awards	Top Twenty Hits	"In Love With The Other"	Won
