= Mondo (Italian company) =

Italian company

- Company type: Public
- Industry: Conglomerate
- Founded: 1948; 78 years ago
- Founders: Edmondo Giovanni Stroppiana
- Headquarters: Alba, Piedmont, Italy
- Area served: Worldwide
- Website: Mondoworldwide.com Mondocontractflooring.com Mondomarine.it

Mondo S.p.A. is an Italian company best known for manufacturing and installing track and field and other athletic surfaces. The company was founded in 1948 in Alba, Piedmont by Edmondo Giovanni Stroppiana, who used part of his name to name the organization. Mondo has supplied track and field surfaces for the last ten Olympic Games. The company also produces commercial rubber flooring for schools, hospitals, office buildings, and more.

== History ==
After Edmondo Giovanni Stroppiana founded Mondo in 1948, the company began making adhesives to repair the inner tubes of bike tires. In addition, Mondo also manufactured rubber balls for Pallapugno, an Italian handball game. In 1950, the company got its break by winning a contract to produce 500,000 promotional Pallapugno balls for Ferrero S.p.A.

As the company grew, they began to expand their product line into floors. In 1961, Mondo supplied flooring for the 100th anniversary of Italian Unification. In 1972, they won their first contract to install the first track at the Italian National Olympic Committee, which began their foray into providing athletic surfaces for the Olympic Games. In 1980 they became the official supplier of the Moscow Olympics and have been so consecutively since the Barcelona Olympic Games in 1992 all the way through the most recent Tokyo 2020 Olympic Games.

Today, Mondo is an official supplier for more than 100 sports-related associations and organizations including IAAF, National Soccer Coaches Association of America and YMCA and sells products in nearly 200 countries. The company has manufacturing subsidiaries in its home country of Italy, as well as Luxembourg, Spain, China, and the U.S. supplying sports surfaces, contract flooring, sports balls, and luxury yachts.
