= List of fictional bears =

The fictional bears listed here are limited to notable, named characters that appear in video games, film, television, animation, comics and literature, including pandas, but not the unrelated red panda species. This is a subsidiary to the List of fictional animals article.

== Animation ==
Character	Origin	Notes
Akakabuto	Ginga Nagareboshi Gin	A power-hungry bear from the fictional Japanese mountains of Ohu. His name means "red-helmet", after the unusual red patch of fur lining his backbone. Bloodthirsty and wrathful, he terrorizes the people of nearby villages and forms alliances with other powerful bears to build a fortress in the mountains. He is the main villain in Ginga Nagareboshi Gin and makes a cameo in Ginga Legend WEED via narrated flashbacks.
Andy Panda	Walter Lantz	He has a girlfriend called Miranda Panda and a father called Andrew Senior, who have appeared in many cartoons and comic books. One of his comic book adventures was drawn by Carl Barks. John Stanley also did Andy Panda comic book work.
Baloo	The Jungle Book (Disney)	A sloth bear and friend of Mowgli and Bagheera in the 1967 animated film, an adaptation of the original The Jungle Book stories by Rudyard Kipling, who reprises his role in the 2016 live-action remake. In the animated series TaleSpin, he is the pilot of the transport plane "Sea Duck".
Barnacles	The Octonauts	The captain of the Octonauts ship.
Barney Bear	Barney Bear	A grumpy brown bear who struggles to cope with the annoyances around him.
Barry Bear	The Angry Beavers	Barry Bear is a laid-back grizzly bear with a deep voice. He enjoys funk music and is a disco artist with multiple songs. He is a parody of Barry White.
Bear	Masha and the Bear	A brown bear who is Masha's best friend.
Bear	WordWorld	A bear that is made up of the letters B, E, A, and R.
Bears	Sing	The main antagonists of the film and enemies of Mike the Mouse.
Benjamin "Ben" Bear	The Secret World of Benjamin Bear	The titular protagonist of the children's animated series, in which teddy bears are alive, but this must be kept a secret.
Bernard	Bernard	A funny polar bear, also known as Backkom.
Bert	Willa's Wild Life	
Bikini Bear	Steven	Bikini Bear is a male bear who wears a bikini.
Bi-Polar Bear	Queer Duck	One of Queer Duck's friends. He often makes bad jokes that only he finds funny.
Big Mikey	Bunsen Is a Beast	A black bear who is given to and named after Mikey in the episode "Bearly Acceptable Behavior".
Blossom	Whisker Haven Tales with the Palace Pets	Mulan's panda cub and member of the Palace Pets.
Bladvic	Legends of Chima	The Prince of the Bear tribe.
Blubber Bear	Wacky Races	Luke's racing partner.
Bobo	The Simpsons	Mr. Burns' treasured childhood teddy bear.
Bojan	Bojan the Bear	A painter who paints his own world with three colours.
Bongo	Fun and Fancy Free	A circus bear.
Boo-Boo	The Yogi Bear Show; The Huckleberry Hound Show	Boo-Boo Bear resides in Jellystone Park and, while evading Ranger Smith along with Yogi Bear, often questions him why they are trying to steal picnic baskets.
Boog	Open Season	Elliot's best friend and the protagonist of the film and its sequels.
Boris	Miffy and Friends	
Brandon	OK K.O.! Let's Be Heroes	An anthropomorphic bear and minor recurring character, who works at IFrame Outlet in Lakewood Plaza Turbo alongside A Real Magic Skeleton.
Bossy	Bossy Bear	
Breezly	Breezly and Sneezly	A comical, resourceful polar bear who sticks with his friend Sneezly.
Brother Bear	Coonskin	A satirical subversion of Joel Chandler Harris and Disney's similar character from Song of the South, reimagined as an African-American.
The Buddy Bears	Garfield and Friends	Singing annoying bears that 'always get along'.
Burble	Danger Rangers	A polar bear good at skateboarding, who teaches kids about safety.
Burple Bear	Foster's Home for Imaginary Friends	
Charlie Beary	The Beary Family	An incompetent family man bear who has to deal with his naggy wife Bessie, his dim-witted teenage son Junior, and younger daughter Suzy.
Cindy Bear	The Yogi Bear Show	Yogi Bear's girlfriend. First appears as a blue bear wearing yellow garments, but is redesigned in Hey There, It's Yogi Bear!.
Corporal	Penguins of Madagascar	A polar bear who is a member of the North Wind.
Cub	Happy Tree Friends	Causes trouble, usually through dangerous activities, while his father does not pay attention.
Disco Bear	Happy Tree Friends	A light orange-colored bear with an orange afro and sideburns who likes to dance to disco music. He wears 1970s-style clothing, including a yellow leisure jacket, yellow bell-bottom pants, and orange and white dancing platform shoes.
Ernest	Ernest & Celestine	An initially destitute bear who rejects his family's plan for him to go into law to pursue his dream of becoming an entertainer.
Farmer Bear	Elinor Wonders Why	A presumably female grizzly bear who is a recurring character in the show. She is, as her title implies, a working farmer in Animal Town. She is voiced by Ellen Dubin.
Flippy	Happy Tree Friends	Flippy is a retired veteran soldier in the Army who fought in the Weaponized Animal Regiment (W.A.R.) and has an obsession with making booby traps. He is named for his tendency to "flip out" and kill anyone in sight when he sees or hears something related to war.
Fluffy	Duckman	A pink teddy bear and one of Duckman's two Care Bear-esque office assistants along with his co-worker Uranus, who try to get Duckman to act kindly and more politically correct.
Fozzie Bear	The Muppets	
George and Junior	Metro-Goldwyn-Mayer cartoons	Two bears inspired by George and Lennie from John Steinbeck's Of Mice and Men.
Ginko Yurishiro	Yuri Kuma Arashi	
Gordon	Camp Lazlo	A bear bean scout.
Grizzly	Shirokuma Cafe	
Grizzly Bear	Happy Tree Friends	A male grizzly bear who appears in the episode "Take a Hike".
Grizzly Bear	We Bare Bears	One of three brothers trying to fit in with human society.
Grizzy	Grizzy & the Lemmings	A bear who constantly battles a clan of lemmings, with results that always end in both Grizzy and the lemmings losing in bizarre, comical ways.
Grizz Kodiak	The Mysteries of Alfred Hedgehog	Local carpenter of Gnarly Woods.
Gummibär	Gummibär (Music Videos), Yummy Gummy Search For Santa and Gummibär & Friends: The Gummy Bear Show	An obese, anthropomorphic green gummy bear wearing orange Y-front underwear, who loves singing and dancing.
Hei Bai	Avatar: The Last Airbender	Spirits of the forest that take the form of a panda bear.
Humphrey the Bear	Walt Disney shorts	A bear who usually harasses Donald Duck and park ranger J. Audubon Woodlore.
Ice Bear	We Bare Bears	One of three brothers trying to fit in with human society.
Jack Bear	Goldie & Bear	Mama and Papa Bear's son, who met Goldie after she accidentally broke his favourite chair.
Karadi	"Karadi Tales"	A Himalayan brown bear who appears in the first season of the show, telling stories from the Panchatantra, Jatakas and Indian mythology.
Kenai	Brother Bear	An Alaskan native teenager who is transformed into an Alaskan Kodiak bear, as described by the film information, or as a brown bear, as determined by historical facts, as punishment for killing Koda's mother. Along with Koda, he embarks on a journey to the mountain where the lights touch the earth to turn back into a human, but decides to remain a bear after realizing that Koda needs him more.
Kevin	Zootopia	Mr. Big's most trusted henchman and a member of the Tundratown mafia.
Kissyfur	Kissyfur	A male cub who lives with his father in the swamps.
Kit Cloudkicker	TaleSpin	Formerly an air pirate, he becomes a navigator for Baloo after escaping.
Koda	Brother Bear	An orphaned Alaskan grizzly bear cub, as described by the film information, or as a brown bear cub, as determined by historical facts, who becomes a friend to Kenai.
Kumajiro	Hetalia: Axis Powers	A pet polar bear owned by the personification of Canada. He is often shown to not recognize Canada as a joke that no one knows Canada, even his pet.
Leonard	Rudolph the Red-Nosed Reindeer: The Movie	
Life Beauty	Yuri Kuma Arashi	
Life Cool	Yuri Kuma Arashi	
Life Sexy	Yuri Kuma Arashi	
Little John	Disney's Robin Hood	A legendary outlaw and Robin Hood's best friend.
Lots-o'-Huggin' Bear	Toy Story 3	A stuffed bear and the main antagonist.
Luk	Balto	
Lulu Yurigasaki	Yuri Kuma Arashi	
Lumpjaw	Fun and Fancy Free	Main antagonist to Bongo.
Malloy	Brickleberry	A crude, racist, and sexist grizzly bear cub who plays video games.
Marezou	Girl Friend BETA	
Master Yo	Yin Yang Yo!	Father and teacher of Yin and Yang.
Maxie	Chilly Willy	A polar bear and one of Chilly Willy's best friends. He is first seen in Polar Fright, when he must take care not to wake up a dog. Maxie meets Willy in Chilly Chums, when he saves Maxie from a hunter.
Mimmo	Charley and Mimmo	Charley's subanthromorphic teddy bear toy and one of the main characters. He communicates through squeaks and squeals.
Mishka	Masha and the Bear	A retired circus bear who acts as a fatherly figure and friend to Masha.
Molly Cunningham	TaleSpin	Rebecca Cunningham's yellow-furred, six-year-old daughter.
Mor'du	Brave	A violent, massive bear with the strength of ten men. Formerly a human Scottish prince, he was transformed through a spell he acquired in an attempt to defeat his brothers for total control of an ancient kingdom.
Mouk	Mouk	A globe-trotting bear.
Muk	Balto	
Natsu	Kuma Miko: Girl Meets Bear	
Norm	Norm of the North	The titular character, who has to prevent Greene Homes condos from arriving in the Arctic.
Norvyn	Kingdom Force	A serious polar bear who protects the Ice Kingdom and part of Kingdom Force. He is the biggest, oldest, and strongest member of the team; his vehicle Rider 5 is the strongest of the vehicles, has a grappling hook, and can turn into a submarine. He also has a nephew, named Artie. Norvyn has a big appetite and a keen interest in fishing. He wears blue fingerless gloves.
Oso	Special Agent Oso	A teddy bear and the titular protagonist. A special agent working for the United Network for Investigating Quite Usual Events (U.N.I.Q.U.E.), who helps children perform everyday tasks.
Pancada	The Little Panda Fighter	A panda bear working as janitor at the Bear Bar Box, a boxing ring and bar for bears, who dreams of becoming a dancer.
Panda Bear	Shirokuma Cafe	
Panda	Jujutsu Kaisen	A mutated Cursed Corpse resembling a giant panda.
Panda Bear	We Bare Bears	One of three brothers trying to fit in with human society.
Panny	Panda! Go, Panda!	
Pants Bear	Pants Bear	The story of Pants Bear and his family started in 2018, but the origins of Pants Bear dates back to the early 1990s in Finland, when Dr. Taavi Kuisma, who would go on to become the author of Pants Bear, acquired a special teddy bear with bright green pants.
Papa Panda	Panda! Go, Panda!	
Party Pat	Adventure Time	A slender bear who is the leader of the Party Bears.
Pat	Adventure Time	A female bear who is Kim Kil Whan‘s wife.
Paw Paw Chuck	Paws & Tales	Grizzly bear and folksy mentor of C.J. Brown and his friends.
Peetie the Sexual Harassment Panda	South Park	Real name Tom Morris, he is a misfit educational mascot dressed as a panda who teaches children about sexual harassment. He eventually becomes "Peetie the Don't Sue People Panda" to end the crisis of South Park's citizens constantly suing various people.
Penny Ling	Littlest Pet Shop	
Pepper	Summer Camp Island	A panda normally seen with his security blanket, who tends to have a somewhat neurotic personality.
Peter the Panda	Phineas and Ferb	A secret agent panda from Seattle.
"Master" Po Ping	Kung Fu Panda	An energetic and overweight giant panda who becomes the Dragon Warrior.
Polar Bear	Shirokuma Cafe	The proprietor of the café, which serves organic foods and drinks and is popular with both humans and animals. He has a habit of making bad puns with his customers and friends, for the amusement of hearing their retorts.
Pop	Happy Tree Friends	Cub's father, who usually causes misfortune for his son casually or through negligence.
Professor Paljas	Alfred J. Kwak	
Punch	Hustle Punch	The main character: a street child bear.
Queen Elinor	Brave	Merida's mother, who is transformed into a bear for two days by a spell that Merida obtains from The Witch, which has unforeseen consequences.
Rebecca Cunningham	TaleSpin	
Rilakkuma	Rilakkuma	"Relax Bear" and his friend Korilakkuma are bear characters from the San-X Company who are largely popular in Japan.
Roro	Shirobako	Rupert is a comic strip character from Great Britain's Daily Express.
Sebastian Star Bear	Sebastian Star Bear: First Mission	An extraterrestrial Star Bear from the Ursa Major constellation who flies to Earth in his CRYOG after hearing Griselda's plea for help.
Shao May	Fullmetal Alchemist: Brotherhood	
Sonny	Rimba Racer	
Sonya the Bear	Madagascar 3: Europe's Most Wanted	King Julien's love interest.
The Squishy Bearz	Eek! The Cat	Parodic versions of the Care Bears, consisting of Kozy, Puffy, Wuz Wuz and Pierre.
SuperTed	SuperTed	A teddy bear made in a toy factory who is discarded after he is discovered to be defective. He is discovered by the alien Spotty, who brings him to life with his "cosmic dust" and takes him to Mother Nature, who gives him powers.
Taotao	Taotao	
Ted E. Bear	The Bear Who Slept Through Christmas	Theodore Edward (Ted E.) Bear is a bear who goes exploring while the other bears are hibernating.
Ted the Polar Bear	The Madagascar Penguins in a Christmas Caper	A polar bear who has a lonely Christmas until Private decides to get him a present.
Teddy Ruxpin	The Adventures of Teddy Ruxpin	Better known as "The World's First Animated Talking Toy".
Teri	The Amazing World of Gumball	A paper cutout bear and student at Elmore Junior High.
The Gummi Bears	Disney's Adventures of the Gummi Bears	Fictional group of anthropomorphic bears who have a long and rich history, and are relatively unknown to the humans of the world, who believe that they are legends and fairy tales.
The Hair Bear Bunch!	Help!... It's the Hair Bear Bunch!	Three fun-loving bears – the fast-talking Hair Bear (voiced by Daws Butler), bafflegab-talking Bubi Bear (voiced by Paul Winchell), and laid-back Square Bear (voiced by William Callaway) – who are always trying to find a way to escape from the Wonderland Zoo on some sort of get-rich-quick scheme, or a wild night of fun.
The Hillbilly Bears	The Hillbilly Bears	The Hillbilly Bears starred in a Hanna-Barbera Productions animated television series, featuring Paw Rugg, Maw Rugg, Floral Rugg, and Shag Rugg.
The Three Bears	Looney Tunes	The Three Bears are a family that consists of Papa Bear (sometimes called Henry), Mama Bear, and Junior Bear (sometimes spelled Junyer or Joonyer).
Tim the Bear	The Cleveland Show	One of Cleveland and Donna's neighbors in Stoolbend. He is thirty-five years old and lives with his wife, Arianna, and his son, Raymond. He has deep religious convictions, often attending Stoolbend Community Church and having his honeymoon in Israel, and works as a telemarketer at Waterman Cable.
Umka	Umka	A polar bear cub who befriends a boy from the Nenets tribe and sets out to find him after people leave the territory.
Uranus	Duckman	A blue teddy bear and one of Duckman's two Care Bear-esque office assistants along with his co-worker Fluffy, who try to get Duckman to act kindly and more politically correct.
Various bears	Adventure Time	
Victor	Victor & Maria	
Vincent	Over the Hedge	An American black bear and the antagonist.
Vladimir Goudenov Grizzlikof	Darkwing Duck	A grizzly bear and S.H.U.S.H.'s top agent.
Winnie-the-Pooh	Winnie the Pooh (franchise)	A teddy bear and the titular protagonist of the Winnie the Pooh franchise created by A.A. Milne. He is one of Disney's most popular characters.
Yogi Bear	The Yogi Bear Show; The Huckleberry Hound Show	Yogi Bear resides in Jellystone Park and often tries to steal picnic baskets while evading Ranger Smith.
Wilbur	The Son of Bigfoot	A good and friendly grizzly bear in the animated movie.
Windy & Breezy	Walter Lantz	A father bear and his son, Windy usually tries to sneak food from people and always ends in bad situations while his son Breezy innocently exclaims proudly "Thats my pop!", the duo debuted in the Woody Woodpecker cartoon "Fodder and Son" and also have co-starred with the other Lantz' character Inspector Willoughby in some cartoons, the duo appeared in a total of 5 theatrical cartoons.
Zozi	Bartok the Magnificent	

== Comics ==
Character	Origin	Creator	Notes
Ambrose	Rupert the Chick	Arthur White	Best friend of Rupert the Chick.
Anne Marie Doddel	Tom Poes	Marten Toonder	Love interest and later wife of Olivier B. Bommel.
Bamse	Bamse	Rune Andréasson	The strongest bear in the whole world.
Barnstable Bear	Pogo	Walt Kelly	A simple-minded bear.
Bear	Bear	Jamie Smart	
Biffo the Bear	The Beano	Dudley D. Watkins	
Birre Beer	Birre Beer	Phiny Dick, Ton Beek, Andries Brandt, Eiso Toonder	A naïve young bear who lives in a forest with his friends Socratov the mouse and Mirre, the daughter of a woodsman.
Bobby Bear	The Annuals	Kitsie Bridges, Dora McLaren, Wilfred Haughton, Meg	
Bobo	Bobo	Lars Mortimer	
Brommy & Tommy	Brommy & Tommy	Jan Dirk van Exter	Two young bears who are good friends.
Mrs. Bruin	Tiger Tim (aka The Bruin Boys)	Julius Stafford Baker, Herbert Sydney Foxwell	A female bear who works as a teacher. The character was originally a hippopotamus named Mrs. Hippo.
Brummel	Brummel und Knickebein	Rolf Kauka	A bear whose sidekick is Knickebein the raven.
Bussi Bär	Bussi Bär	Rolf Kauka	A bear whose comic strip ran from 1973 until 2013.
Cornelius Bear	Achewood	Chris Onstad	
Demon Bear	New Mutants	Chris Claremont, Bob McLeod	A monstrous bear created by the Adversary by transforming Danielle Moonstar's parents, William and Peg.
Fuzz	Fuzz & Pluck	Ted Stearn	A naïve, gullible teddy bear with self-doubt.
Genma Saotome	Ranma ½	Rumiko Takahashi	
Giorgione	Pinky	Massimo Mattioli	Best friend of Pinky the rabbit.
Gohin	Beastars	Paru Itagaki	One of the main characters. A giant panda who acts as a doctor and therapist for carnivores in the Black Market.
Io	The War of the Realms: New Agents of Atlas	Greg Pak, Gang Hyuk Lim	A "half-moon" bear spirit sealed inside a magic mask. Companion to Crescent.
Jasper the Bear	Jasper the Bear	James Simpkins	Debuted in a gag comic and later became mascot of Jasper National Park
Kozlov Leifonovich Grebnev	Biomega	Tsutomu Nihei	
Lala Hiyama	Knights of Sidonia	Tsutomu Nihei	A talking bear who serves as "dorm mother."
Lord Noriyuki	Usagi Yojimbo	Stan Sakai	
Nanook The Bipolarbear	Nanook the Bipolarbear (Book)	James Osborn	A bear on a journey of discovery.
Nestor	Moky et Poupy	Roger Bussemy	Pet bear of two Native American children, Moky and Poupy.
Olivier B. Bommel (Oliver B. Bumble)	Tom Poes	Marten Toonder	A bear who lives like a nobleman. Best friend of Tom Poes.
Panda	Panda	Marten Toonder	A intelligent panda bear.
Peter	Snowdrop's Zoo	Arnold Warden	A sidekick of Chic the clown.
Ping	Jungle Jinks	Mabel F. Taylor	A panda friend of the main cast.
Placid	Placid et Muzo	José Cabrero Arnal	
Pooky	Garfield	Jim Davis	Garfield's teddy bears.
Popol et Virginie	Popol Out West	Hergé	Two bears who visit the United States, where they encounter Native American rabbits.
P.T. Bridgeport	Pogo	Walt Kelly	A flamboyant impresario and traveling circus operator named after P. T. Barnum, with a theatrical speech pattern and carnival barker's sales spiel satirizing the circus-like, media frenzy atmosphere of American political campaigns.
Rasmus Klump	Rasmus Klump	Carla and Vilhelm Hansen	A bear who owns a boat on which he travels the world.
Riz	Beastars	Paru Itagaki	Primary antagonist of the third story arc. A bloodthirsty brown bear struggling to conceal his predatory instincts and the murder of his alpaca classmate Tem from his classmates at Cherryton Academy.
Rupert Bear	Rupert Bear	Mary Tourtel	An English bear who wears a red shirt and yellow scarf.
Samantha Strong	Beneath the Trees Where Nobody Sees	Patrick Horvath	Brown bear in a world of anthropomorphic animals; a carpenter who is secretly a serial killer
Téodor Orezcu	Achewood	Chris Onstad	
The Three Bears	The Three Bears	Leo Baxendale	A bear family modelled after the fairytale and consisting of Pa Bear, Ma Bear, and young son Ted.
Tobby	Tim und Tobby	Becker-Kasch	A bear who is best friends with a fox.
Trinket	Critical Role: Vox Machina Origins	Matthew Mercer	The loyal pet companion of the Half-Elf Ranger, Vex'ahlia de Rolo.
Uncle Bruno	Rupert Bear	Alfred Bestall	Rupert's uncle.
Ursinho Bilu	Monica's Gang	Mauricio de Sousa	A metafictional cartoon character.

== Film and television ==
Character	Origin	Notes
Amy	Bananas in Pyjamas	One of three teddies of Cuddles Avenue.
Archie	Dr. Dolittle 2	A wise-cracking circus-performing bear.
Baby Bear	Sesame Street	Son of Papa and Mama Bear and a good friend of Telly Monster, who later becomes brother to his new baby sister Curly.
Basil the Bear	Sesame Park	
Bear	Bear in the Big Blue House	Bear is a bear who lives in the titular house with his friends Tutter the mouse, Pip and Pop the otters, Ojo the bear cub, Treelo the lemur, and Shadow the shadow.
Bear	Bedknobs and Broomsticks	The Bear is a sailor and fisherman on the Isle of Naboombu who pulls the bed, with Miss Price's group on it, out of the lagoon with his fishing pole, and takes them to see the King after warning them of his temper.
Beary Barrington	The Country Bears	
Ben	The Life and Times of Grizzly Adams	Played by a live bear named Bozo.
Bobby	Teen Titans	A living teddy bear summoned by Melvin who is able to become invisible. Due to his powers, Bobby is initially assumed to be Melvin's imaginary friend.
Bobo the Bear	Muppets Tonight	He is easily amused yet often dry, sarcastic, and slightly befuddled.
Br'er Bear	Song of the South	A dimwitted bear who works together with Br'er Fox.
Bungle	Rainbow	An inquisitive bear who is clumsy and often complains about the other characters.
Buttons the Bear	Puppets Who Kill	
Cocaine Bear	Cocaine Bear	Inspired by the true story of a bear that got high on cocaine.
Colargol	Les Aventures de Colargol	The series was produced from 1967 to 1974, comprising 53 thirteen-minute episodes which were broadcast in many European countries. Renamed Barnaby when it was dubbed into English and broadcast in the UK by the BBC, the series underwent another name change to Jeremy the Bear when a second dubbed version of the series was shown in Canada and in the UK and Ireland.
Dancing Bear	Captain Kangaroo	Silent bear (man in costume) who would dance to songs in occasional appearances.
Eddy and the Bear	Collingwood & Co.	
Fozzie Bear	The Muppets	An orange-brown, fozzie bear who often wears a brown pork pie hat and a pink-and-white polka-dot necktie. Serves as the show's stand-up comic.
Gentle Ben	Gentle Ben	A boy and his tame bear.
Humphrey B. Bear	Here's Humphrey	A tall, shaggy brown bear with a large, glossy nose, straw boater, tartan waist-coat and oversized yellow bow-tie.
Jake The Polar Bear	Jim Henson's Animal Show	One of the show's two hosts.
Jelly	Xuxa	
Jerry Bear	Pajanimals	A bear who loves to give hugs to the ones around his Friendly Forest.
Katahdin	Prophecy 1979	Mutated killer bear.
Lulu	Bananas in Pyjamas	One of three teddies of Cuddles Avenue.
Morgan	Bananas in Pyjamas	One of three teddies of Cuddles Avenue.
Nassur	Tomorrow's Pioneers	An aggressively anti-Semitic teddy bear
Nev the Bear	Bear Behaving Badly	A small, blue puppet bear.
Norvyn	Kingdom Force	A polar bear. He is one of six main leading characters and the team's muscle member. Norvyn pilots a blue snowplow and a submarine.
Ojo	Bear in the Big Blue House	A small bear who is one of Bear's friends.
Oxsana	Borat	Borat and Azamatt's American black bear, which they used for protection when traveling across the United States. She is named after Borat's late wife. who ironically was attacked and killed by a bear.
Radar	Sesame Street	Big Bird’s stuffed teddy bear.
Ringbear	How I Met Your Mother	The ring bearer at Barney and Robin's wedding.
Sooty	The Sooty Show	A glove puppet bear, created by Harry Corbett in 1948, that appears on British television.
Ted	Ted	A talking teddy bear.
Teddy	A.I. Artificial Intelligence	A robotic toy bear belonging to David, a robot himself.
Ursa	Bear in the Big Blue House	Bear's Hispanic girlfriend.
Waldo	"The Waldo Moment" episode of Black Mirror	A computer generated, human animated foul-mouthed television celebrity.

== Literature ==
Character	Origin	Author	Notes
Aloysius	Brideshead Revisited	Evelyn Waugh	Sebastian Flyte's teddy bear.
Baloo	The Jungle Book, The Second Jungle Book	Rudyard Kipling	A sloth bear who is Mowgli's mentor and friend.
Bear	Franklin	Paulette Bourgeois	A brown bear who is Franklin's best friend.
Bear	The Honey and Bear Stories	Ursula Dubosarsky	A bear who lives with the bird Honey, a silvereye, native to Australia.
Bear	Bear	Marian Engel	The titular unnamed bear, whose relationship with a librarian is the subject of the novel.
Bear Family	Berenstain Bears	Stan and Jan Berenstain	The Family consists of Father Bear, Mother Bear, Brother Bear, Sister Bear, and eventually Honey Bear.
Ben	The Life and Times of Grizzly Adams	Charles Sellier	
Big Double	Little Tricker the Squirrel Meets Big Double the Bear	Ken Kesey; Barry Moser	An obese grizzly bear, who is the main antagonist. He terrorizes and eats the animals of Topple's Bottom until he is outmatched by Little Tricker the Squirrel.
Bluebear	The 13 1/2 Lives of Captain Bluebear	Walter Moers	A Chromabear living in Zamonia who goes on many adventures. He is intelligent and amiable.
Br'er Bear	"Uncle Remus" stories	Joel Chandler Harris	A slow witted bear working with Br'er Fox to capture and eat Br'er Rabbit.
Corduroy	Corduroy	Don Freeman	A teddy bear who hopes to be owned by a girl named Lisa.
Gentle Ben	Gentle Ben	Walt Morey	A grizzly bear in the book, who is a black bear in the TV series and movies.
Harvey	A Father's Day Thank You	Janet Nolan	A bear cub who gives a thankyou card to his dad.
Iorek Byrnison	His Dark Materials	Philip Pullman	A male armored polar bear and honorable friend to Lyra, who is the rightful king of Svalbard.
Issi Noho	Issi Noho	Keith Chatfield	
Lars	The Little Polar Bear	Hans de Beer	Adapted into a TV Series for BBC in the 1990s and five films by Warner Bros.
Little Bear	Little Bear	Else Holmelund Minarik	Illustrated by Maurice Sendak and adapted into a TV series by Nelvana and Nickelodeon.
Mary Plain	Mary Plain	Gwynedd Rae	
Misha	The Foundation Pit	Andrei Platonov	
Mister Bultitude	That Hideous Strength	C. S. Lewis	The Great Bear of Logres, resident at St. Anne's.
Mord	Borne	Jeff VanderMeer	
Old Bear	Old Bear and Friends	Jane Hissey	An elderly dusty teddy bear, whom the other toys look up as a fearless, yet wise leader.
Old Ben	The Bear	William Faulkner	
Old Majesty	Irish Red	Jim Kjelgaard	A large bear that terrorizes the wilderness.
Osweald Bera	Osweald Bera	Colin Gorrie	A bear living in England during the reign of Æthelred the Unready. he is accompanied on his journey to see the world by Æthelstan the Mouse and Cuthbert the Monk.
Paddington Bear	Paddington Bear	Michael Bond	A bear who emigrated from Peru to the station he was named after. First illustrated by Peggy Fortnum.
Padistan Bear	Padistan Bear	John Warner	A young bear forced to leave home alone and make his way in the world. Illustrated by Angela Winstanley.
Rupert Bear	Rupert Bear	Mary Tourtel	Also known as Rupert the Bear.
Shardik	Shardik	Richard Adams	
State O' Maine	The Hotel New Hampshire	John Irving	An oddly intelligent performing bear who works with Freud, a Viennese Jew.
Snuffles	Snuffles	R.A. Lafferty	Appears in: Galaxy Magazine, 1960–12. The sole inhabitant of the bizarre planet Bellota, he is discovered by a scientific expedition of five, who he kills, and is revealed to be the Demiurge.
Teddy	The Night After Christmas	James Stevenson	
Teddy Robinson	The Teddy Robinson Storybook	Joan G. Robinson	Teddy Robinson is a cuddly but accident-prone teddy bear belongs to a little girl named Deborah.
Tessie Bear	Noddy	Enid Blyton	A female teddy bear and Noddy's best friend. Debuted in the 1954 book Noddy Gets into Trouble.
The Three Bears	Goldilocks and the Three Bears	Robert Southey	A family of three bears, whose house Goldilocks enters.
Tottles	Tottles the Bear	Humphry Bowen	
Winkie	Winkie	Clifford Chase	
Winnie-the-Pooh	Winnie-the-Pooh	A. A. Milne	Described as a bear of very little brain, yet has good ideas when helping with his friends.

== Video games ==
Character	Origin	Developer	Notes
Agent Patch	Fortnite	Epic Games	An anthropomorphic male panda bear with an eyepatch on his left eye.
Bamboo Pandamonium (Note: "Bamboo Pandemonium" (バンブー・パンデモニウム Banbū Pandemoniumu) in the original Japanese version.)	Mega Man X8	Capcom	Robotic panda encountered as a boss in a bamboo forest. Works with the main villain, Sigma, to bring about his vision of the world.
Banjo	Diddy Kong Racing	Rare	A laid back and easygoing bear, who is the titular protagonist alongside the loudmouthed bird Kazooie.
Bear villagers	Animal Crossing	Nintendo EAD	The bear villagers include Beardo, Charlise, Chow, Curt, Dozer, Grizzly, Groucho, Ike, Klaus, Megan, Nate, Paula, Pinky, Teddy, Tutu, and Ursala.
Bearbara	Rhythm Heaven Megamix	Nintendo SPD	Beary's girlfriend. She is tan-colored with a pink dress and a pink ribbon over her left ear.
Beary	Rhythm Heaven Megamix	Nintendo SPD	The player character in the minigame "Blue Bear". Appearing as a solemn blue bear who loves to eat donuts and cakes, it is revealed at the end that the events of the minigame were his dream. In reality, he is brown with a red nose.
Ben Bigger	Zenless Zone Zero	miHoYo	A playable anthropomorphic male brown bear agent and member of the Belobog Heavy Industries faction.
Bentley Bear	Crystal Castles	Atari, Inc.	The main protagonist and playable character in Crystal Castles. After hibernating for over a decade, Bentley was featured as a racer in Atari Karts on the Jaguar. More recently, he was referenced in a Lupe Fiasco song and made a cameo appearance in Wreck-It Ralph.
Bruno Bear	Toon Blast	Peak Games	A bear who is friend of Wally Wolf and Cooper Cat.
Chen Stormstout	Warcraft III: The Frozen Throne	Blizzard Entertainment	Warrior and Brewmaster of the Pandaren people. Playable character in the Heroes of the Storm.
Choko	Animal Boxing	Gammick Entertainment	Male brown bear boxer.
Cub villagers	Animal Crossing	Nintendo EAD	The cub villagers include Aisle, Barold, Bluebear, Cheri, Chester, Cupcake, Judy, June, Kody, Maple, Marty, Murphy, Olive, Pekoe, Poko, Poncho, Pudge, Stitches, Tammy and Vladimir.
Freddy Fazbear	Five Nights at Freddy's	Scott Cawthon	An animatronic bear built for Freddy Fazbear's Pizza. He has five counterparts: Golden Freddy/Fredbear, who appears in Five Nights at Freddy's and Five Nights at Freddy's 2, Toy Freddy, Withered/Old Freddy, and Purple/Shadow Freddy, who appear in Five Nights at Freddy's 2, Phantom Freddy, who appears in Five Nights at Freddy's 3, and Nightmare, who appears in Five Nights at Freddy's 4 alongside Golden Freddy as "Fredbear".
Grizzly Slash (Note: "Crescent Grizzly" (クレッセTント・グリズリー Kuressento Gurizurī) in the original Japanese version.)	Mega Man X5	Capcom	Robotic grizzly bear fought as a boss on a large truck after he goes berserk from the "Sigma Virus".
Grriz	Fortnite	Epic Games	
Hank	Bear and Breakfast	Gummy Cat	Hank the Bear and his friends convert a small, rundown shack into the best hospitality service this side of the Mississippi.
Herbert Percival Bear, Esquire	Club Penguin	Disney Interactive Studios	The main antagonist.
Ivan the Bear	Brutal: Paws of Fury	GameTek	Russian brown bear who fights using Soviet military style.
Kuma	Tekken	Namco	Bodyguard and pet of Heihachi Mishima.
Kumazo	Animal Boxing	Gammick Entertainment	Male polar bear boxer.
Li Li Stormstout	World of Warcraft: Mists of Pandaria	Blizzard Entertainment	Niece and traveling companion of Chen Stormstout. Playable character in the Heroes of the Storm.
Lola	Lola Panda	BeiZ Ltd.	An anthropomorphic panda who wears a pink short-sleeved shirt, knee length jeans, and sneakers.
Misha	Warcraft III: The Frozen Throne	Blizzard Entertainment	Brown bear companion of the beastmaster Rexxar. Misha also appears in the Heroes of the Storm as a part of Rexxar's ability kit.
Moneybags	Spyro 2: Ripto's Rage!	Insomniac Games	A greedy bear who has an obsession and love for money.
Monokuma	Danganronpa	Spike	A robotic black and white teddy bear that takes over Hope's Peak Academy and finds joy in spreading despair.
Mr. Grizz	Splatoon 2	Nintendo	Initially represented by a Kibori kuma-shaped radio in the Salmon Run mode, he first appears in the flesh in Splatoon 3, where he is the main antagonist. A gigantic bear with a small head, he plans to cover the Earth in Fuzzy Ooze in order to change all marine life back into mammals. He is the Founder & CEO of Grizzco Industries, a shady company that employs Inklings and Octolings to collect Golden Eggs, a vital ingredient in creating the Fuzzy Ooze.
Naughty Bear	Naughty Bear	Artificial Mind and Movement	A revenge-driven bear and the titular protagonist.
Neera Li	Freedom Planet	GalaxyTrail	A panda priestess and police chief who serves as a midboss in the original game, and the fourth playable character in the sequel. Voiced by Ashlyn Selich.
Panda	Tekken 3	Namco	Companion of Ling Xiaoyu.
Panda King	Sly Cooper and the Thievius Raccoonus	Sucker Punch Productions	Pyrotechnics expert of the Fiendish Five who is recruited to be part of the Cooper Gang in the third game.
PJ Berri	PaRappa The Rapper	NanaOn-Sha	Parappa's best friend and the DJ at ClubFun.
Polar	Crash Bandicoot 2: Cortex Strikes Back	Naughty Dog	Polar bear cub and pet of Crash Bandicoot.
Polar Patroller	Fortnite	Epic Games	An anthropomorphic male polar bear skin.
Poler Kamrous	Mega Man Zero 2	Capcom	Robotic polar bear fought as a boss in Antarctica, where she guards a defense system computer.
Sana	Armello	League of Geeks	Chosen hero of the Bear Clan attuned with nature.
Spade	Freedom Planet	GalaxyTrail	A high-ranking member of the Red Scarves, and arch-rival of Team Lilac. Voiced by Sean Chiplock.
Storvacker	Dragon Age: Inquisition	Bioware	Stone-Bear Hold's Hold-Beast in the Jaws of Hakkon DLC.
Stray	Anomaly Collapse	RocketPunch Games	A playable police chief and one of three main protagonists.
Teddie	Persona 4	Atlus	A Curious Bear/Shadow who joins your Party in hopes of understanding humans as well as helping solve the mystery of a serial killer throwing people into Tvs in a small town called Inaba
Teddy	Animal Crossing	Nintendo EAD	A jock villager who appears in every game in the Animal Crossing series
Teddy	The Darkest Tales	Trinity Team	A stuffed bear warrior that dual wields a pair of scissors as swords.
The Grizz	Sly Cooper: Thieves in Time	Sucker Punch Productions	Graffiti artist who became evil and serves under the command of Cyrille Le Paradox.
Ulfsaar the Ursa Warrior	Defense of the Ancients	Kyle Sommer	Ulfsaar the Warrior is the fiercest member of an Ursine Tribe.
Volibear	League of Legends	Riot Games	A demi-god of the Freljord.
Wallop	Skylanders: Trap Team	Activision	An inventive and hard-working hero of Mount Scorch, who is always looking for new ways to create.
Wally Bear	Wally Bear and the NO! Gang	American Game Cartridges	Title character and anti-drug advocate.
Yaya Panda	Crash Bandicoot Nitro Kart 3D	Polarbit	A female panda who loves to race and is good friend of Crash and Coco Bandicoot.
Yumil	Lollipop Chainsaw	Grasshopper Manufacture	The undead companion of Viking metal zombie Vikke.

== Mascots ==
- Avalanche the Golden Bear, the official mascot of the Golden Bears of Kutztown University of Pennsylvania
- Baerenmarken (Nestle Bear Brand), the mascot for Bärenmarke, a German milk and dairy products company.
- Bananas T. Bear, the official mascot of the University of Maine
- Bandabi, the mascot of the 2018 Winter Paralympic games
- Bely Mishka, one of three mascots of the 2014 Winter Olympics
- Berlino, the mascot of the 2009 World Championships in Athletics
- Berni, the mascot of Bundesliga club Bayern Munich
- Billy Bob Brockali, was the mascot of ShowBiz Pizza Place and was the bass and vocals of the band for the show The Rock-afire Explosion before it re-branded to Chuck E. Cheese's.
- Bing Dwen Dwen, the mascot of the 2022 Winter Olympics
- Blue, the official mascot of Labatt Brewing Company
- Boomer, the official mascot of Lake Forest College
- Boomer, the official mascot of Missouri State University
- Broxi Bear, official mascot of Rangers Football Club
- Bruiser, the official mascot of Baylor University
- Bruiser, the official mascot of Belmont University
- Bruno, the official mascot of Brown University
- Brutus the Bruin Bear, the official mascot Salt Lake Community College
- Bundy R. Bear, official mascot of Bundaberg Rum
- The Care Bears, greeting card mascots
- Carlton the Bear, the official mascot of the Toronto Maple Leafs
- The Charmin Bears, the mascot family of bears for Charmin
- Clark, official team mascot of the Chicago Cubs
- Clutch, the official mascot for the Houston Rockets
- Coca-Cola polar bears, mascots of the Coca-Cola Company
- Coal, one of three mascots of the 2002 Winter Olympics
- Comet, the official mascot of Concordia University
- Cooper, the official mascot for the West Virginia Black Bears
- Cresta, the official mascot for Cresta
- General, the official mascot of Georgia Gwinnett College
- George, the bear in the British Hofmeister Beer commercials of the 1980s.
- Golbear, the official mascot of Haribo
- Golden Bear, the official mascot for Miles College
- Golden Bear, the official mascot for Western New England University
- The Gomdoori, the two Asian black bear mascots of the 1988 Summer Paralympic games
- Griz, the official mascot for Franklin College
- Grizz Also Super Grizz, from the Memphis (Vancouver) Grizzlies
- Grizz, official mascot of Oakland University
- Grizzlies, official mascot of Adams State University
- Grizzly, official mascot of Butler Community College
- The Grupo Bimbo mascot
- Hamm's Beer bear and its wife, Harley bear
- Hidy, one of two mascots of the 1988 Winter Olympics
- Howdy, one of two mascots of the 1988 Winter Olympics
- The Icee Company Bear
- Jazz Bear, the official mascot of the Utah Jazz
- John Lewis bear, mascot for the 2013 Christmas Advert by the John Lewis chain of department stores in Great Britain.
- Jingjing, one of five mascots of the 2008 Summer Olympics
- Klawz Da Bear, the official mascot of the University of Northern Colorado
- Kumamon, mascot of Kumamoto Prefecture, Japan
- Max C Bear, the official mascot of the State University of New York at Potsdam
- Miga, one of three mascots of the 2010 Winter Olympics
- Misha, the mascot of the 1980 Summer Olympics
- Monte, the official mascot of the University of Montana
- The Modified Bear, the main logo/mascot of English rock band Radiohead, created for their 4th studio album, Kid A
- Nanook, one of two mascots for the Edmonton Eskimos
- NYIT Bear, the official mascot of the New York Institute of Technology
- Objee, the official mascot of the United States Coast Guard Academy
- Oski the Bear, the official mascot of the University of California, Berkeley
- Parker T. Bear, the mascot for the Fresno Grizzlies
- Phineas T. Brizzly, the mascot for Brizzly
- Polar Bear, the official mascot of Fox's Glacier Mints
- Polar Bear, the official mascot of the Bowdoin College
- Polar Bear, the official mascot of the Ohio Northern University
- Polar Bear, the official mascot of the University of Alaska Fairbanks. AKA Nanook
- Pom-Bear, the teddy shaped potato snack mascot
- Populoso, the official mascot of the Puerto Rico Islanders
- Pudsey Bear, the official mascot of Children in Need
- Ranger D. Bear, the official mascot of the University of Wisconsin–Parkside
- Scotty the Bear, the official mascot of the University of California, Riverside
- Smokey Bear, mascot of the U.S. Forest Service, based on a real orphaned bear cub also named Smokey
- Snuggle, the fabric softener bear (known as Coccolino in other regions)
- Staley Da Bear, the official mascot of the Chicago Bears
- Sugar Bear, mascot for General Foods Corporation's Post Sugar Crisp cereal
- T. C., the official mascot for the Minnesota Twins
- The Great Root Bear and its wife, Rosie Bear - Corporate mascots for A&W Root Beer and A&W Restaurants
- Toby, the official mascot of Mercer University
- Touchdown, the official mascot of Cornell University. AKA Cornell Big Red
- United Buddy Bears initiated by Klaus and Eva Herlitz
- Victor E. Bear, the official mascot of the University of Central Arkansas

== Myth and folklore ==
- Callisto
- Drop bear
- Golden Bear
- Jambavan
- Jean de l'Ours
- Nandi bear
- Otso
- Ungnyeo
- Ursa Major
- Ursa Minor

== Other ==
- The animatronic cast of the Country Bear Jamboree attraction, found at Walt Disney World's Magic Kingdom and Tokyo Disneyland
- Beach Bear was the guitar and vocals of the band for the show The Rock-afire Explosion before it was re-branded to Chuck E. Cheese.
- Boof, a teddy bear belly heart in Suzy's Zoo
- Choo-choo, a baby black bear that was part of the Rock-afire Explosion. He does not speak, popping out of his tree stump and dancing to the music.
- Cleo deCap, a character from sci-fi comedy Narrative Play podcast Backwater Bastards. Cleo was originally a human whose consciousness was later transferred into a bear-like alien.
- Duffy, Mickey's teddy bear. Originally created for and briefly sold at the Disney World Once Upon a Toy shop in Orlando in 2002, he now can be found at the Tokyo Disney Resort, Disneyland and Disney California Adventure Park in California, Walt Disney World in Florida, Hong Kong Disneyland and Disneyland Paris.
- Fuzzy Wuzzy, subject of the rhyme "Fuzzy Wuzzy Was a Bear", recorded in print in an April 1940 issue of the student newspaper of Susquehanna University.
- Gloomy Bear, character from Japanese graphic designer Mori Chack. An abandoned young bear, he is rescued by Pitty, a little boy. At first, he is cute and cuddly, but becomes wilder as he grows up. Since bears do not become attached to people like dogs by nature, Gloomy attacks Pitty despite him being his owner.
- Gund Snuffles is a plush bear developed and produced by the GUND toy company, who was the recipient of 1996 Oppenheim Toy Portfolio Award.
- Pedobear is an Internet meme that became popular through the imageboard 4chan. As the name suggests ("pedo" being short for "pedophile"), it is portrayed as a pedophilic bear. It is a concept used to mock pedophiles or people who have any sexual interest in children or jailbait. The bear image has been likened to bait, used to lure children or as a mascot for pedophiles.
- Smokey Bear is the iconic mascot of the U.S. Forest Service's wildfire prevention campaign, created in 1944. His famous catchphrase is "Only you can prevent wildfires". The campaign's inspiration came from a real bear cub, found with burned paws after a 1950 wildfire in New Mexico, who was named Smokey and lived at the National Zoo
