= Turner, Kansas City, Kansas =

Turner, Kansas
- Neighborhood
- Location within the state of Kansas Turner (the United States)
- Coordinates: 39°05′00″N 94°42′16″W
- Country: United States
- State: Kansas
- County: Wyandotte
- Elevation: 830 ft (253 m)
- Time zone: UTC-6 (CST)
  - Summer (DST): UTC-5 (CDT)
- Area code: 913
- FIPS code: 20-71775
- GNIS feature ID: 0478951

Turner is a neighborhood within Kansas City, Kansas, United States. It was formerly an unincorporated community of Wyandotte County, similar to Piper, Kansas. Turner has its own school district, Turner USD #202.

== History ==
The Prophet (Tenskwatawa; literally, "the door opener"), brother of Tecumseh, created Shawneetown in the area (near what today is Woodend and Shawnee Drive at 35th street). He made his final home near Turner in Argentine, Kansas. Blue Jacket (Weyapiersenwah), who was Tecumseh's adoptive brother, was known to the early European settlers in this area. According to legend, one of the Shawnee chiefs, Fish, died and was buried in the Shawnee Township Cemetery (which is located in the heart of modern-day Turner).

=== 19th century ===
Wyandotte County, Kansas, 1899 Map from History of Kansas by Noble Prentis.

In 1828, Cyprian Chouteau established the first trading post in this locale. It was the American Fur Company trading house (located near 55th and Speaker Road). The original Shawnee Methodist Mission was built in 1830 near Chouteau's old trading post (near the heart of the Turner community). Reverend Thomas Johnson built the mission for the Shawnee. It was located at what would be 5100 block of Edgehill Drive. This mission was open until 1839, when the Mission School was built at the current location in Johnson County. Around 1837, Charles Lovelace established a saw mill (today it would be located at 55th and Speaker Road, but has been long ago torn down). There was also a grist mill in close proximity. In 1838, the mighty steamboat, "The Antelope" docked in the area. It had several scientists and pioneers heading west. They stayed over in the area on their journey to Fort Pierre in South Dakota.

The Delaware Crossing (or "Military Crossing"; sometimes "the Secondine") was where the old Indian trail met the waters of the Kaw River. Around 1831, Moses Grinter (one of the earliest permanent white settler in the area) set up the Grinter Ferry on the Kansas River here. His house, the Grinter Place, still stands at 1420 South 78th Street. The ferry was used by individuals (such as traders, freighters, and soldiers) traveling between Fort Leavenworth and Fort Scott on the military road. Other would cross this area on their way to Santa Fe.

Various farmers took up residence around Turner by the fall of 1854. Turner as a community was known as early as 1856 (and no later than 1859). The community, then named "Farmer, Kansas", tried to incorporate itself on October 8, 1859. The attempt failed because the community never had enough population to achieve the statute requirements.

Members of the old Quantrill's Raiders sacked a few homes and killed some of the inhabitants of the area around July 1863. Various families (living in the area that today is between Swartz Road from 51st to 53rd Street) suffered in the attacks. They were fended off from but a few homes.

In 1859, the community had been referred to as the "Farmer" community (when the first post office was established). Twenty years later, the community took the name "Turner". Farmer post office name was switched to the "Turner" post office on September 23, 1879; by Robert M. Hester.

=== 20th century ===
The Flood of 1903 hit Turner. The 1910 population was around 200 people. In 1912, Turner had a few general stores, a school, money order post office, telegraph and express facilities.

Historically, the Atchison, Topeka and Santa Fe Railway went through Argentine, Turner, and Kaw Valley. From the railroad yard in the Argentine, the railroad cars would be turned around at the Farmer train platform. The Farmer train station's circular platform stood at 55th street (which is Turner’s main downtown area).

Parts of Turner were hit in the Great Flood of 1951 and the flood resulted in the "Highland" community being built (for displaced individuals from Argentine and Armourdale). Between late 1965 and early 1966, Kansas City, Kansas, annexed the community of Turner. Although now a part of Kansas City, Kansas, the community still retains its own distinct flavor and personality.

The Turner post office was discontinued in 1958.

== Education ==
=== Primary and secondary education ===
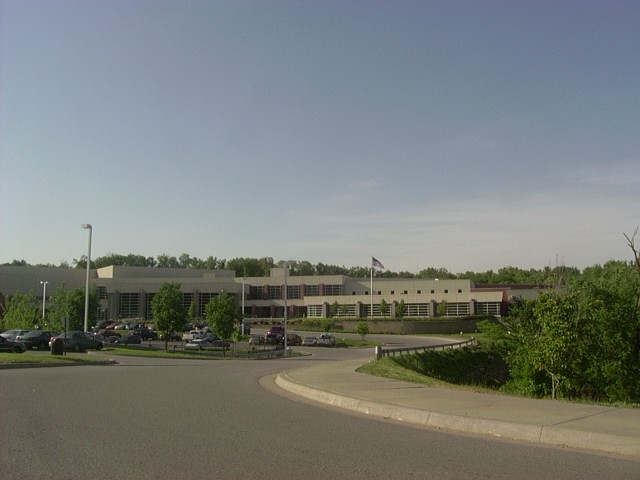
Turner High School, in 2007

The community is served by Turner USD 202 public school district.

The Golden Bear mascot was adopted for the school and community in 1886. Two members of the community, Warren Hewitt and Jule Gaignet, submitted the icon and it won the majority of support in a contest. Reportedly, the two youths had heard of the bear from stories told by their grandparents. This icon is based on legends of a golden bear that live in the area.

According to John Gardiner in 1831, the great golden bear that lived in the area was feared and admired by the local native population. The bear lived south of the river in the hills west of the Methodist Mission. According to legend, it was the largest bear that any of the natives had ever seen. It would raid the settlements of the area folks and feasted on the animals owned by the local population (the Shawnee tribe). Many of the Indians wanted to kill the bear for the pride of such a feat and the capture of its hide (the fur was most sought after). The golden bear was seen several times by the ferry crew on the Old Grinter Ferry during the 1830s and 1840s. Both the Shawnee and the Wyandot gathered a hunting party, but were unsuccessful in tracking the bear down.

Turner USD 202 consolidated the five old school districts of Turner, Junction, Oak Grove, Morris, and Muncie in 1961 and currently consists of:

- Turner High School
- Turner Middle School
- Turner Primary
- Junction Primary
- Oak Grove Primary
- Midland Trail Primary
- Sixth Grade Academy

== Infrastructure ==
=== Roads ===
- Interstate 435
- Turner Diagonal
- K-132

=== Street names ===
The road overseers were Peter Partonnar, John Gibbs, and H. L. Swinggley. Peter Partonnar (sometimes misspelled as Parturner) has been rumored to be the origin of the name for Turner (but this is doubtful as the Partonnar family lived in Shawnee for many years and did not come to live in Turner till the name was already acquired).

New and old

- 55th Street (Portion) was known as "Lovelace Mill Road" and later it was named "Ambrose Key Road" after the saw mill was closed down. Still later it was renamed "Turner Avenue" until annexation. (55th leads Douglas and then into Key lane which goes to Gibbs Road)
- 56th Street was "Central Avenue"
- 57th Street was "Ore Avenue"
- Gibbs Road was named in honor of John Gibbs Jr.
- Metropolitan Avenue was "Hester Road"; Albert Hester had a farm, Hester Farm, on this route (it also crossed the road from Fort Scott and Fort Leavenworth).
- Swartz Road was "Silver Avenue"
- Miami was "Smelter Avenue"
- Osage was "Cable Avenue"
- Key Lane was for a time called "Ridgeview Road"
