= Delaware Crossing =

Delaware Crossing may refer to

An event:

- George Washington's crossing of the Delaware River with the Continental Army prior to the Battle of Trenton on December 26, 1776
- Washington Crossing the Delaware (1851 painting), an oil painting depicting the above

A place:

- Washington Crossing State Park, a state park of New Jersey
- Washington Crossing Historic Park, a state park of Pennsylvania
- Grinter Place, a house on the US National Register of Historic Places above the Kansas River in the Muncie neighborhood of Kansas City, Kansas.
