= Golden Bear (legend) =

Mythological bear

In American folklore, the Golden Bear was a large golden Ursus arctos. Members of the Ursus arctos (brown bear) species can reach masses of 130–700 kilograms (290–1,540 lb). The grizzly bear (Ursus arctos horribilis) and the Kodiak bear are North American subspecies of the brown bear.

A great Golden Bear was reported in the area of Turner, Kansas. According to John Gardiner in 1831, it was feared and admired by the local Indigenous population. The bear lived south of the river in the hills west of the Methodist Mission. According to legend, it was the largest bear that any of the natives had ever seen. It would raid the settlements in the area and it feasted on the animals owned by the local population (the Shawnee tribe). Many of the Indians wanted to kill the bear for the pride of such a feat and for the capture of its hide (the fur was most sought after). The Golden Bear was seen several times by the ferry crew on the Old Grinter Ferry during the 1830s and 1840s. Both the Shawnee and the Wyandot tribes gathered a hunting party, but were unsuccessful in tracking the bear down.

The "Golden Bear" became the mascot for Turner High School and was adopted by the community in 1886. Two members of the community, Warren Hewitt and Jule Gaignet, submitted the icon and it won the majority of support in a contest. Reportedly, the two youths had heard of the bear from stories told by their grandparents. This icon is based on legends of that golden bear.

Western New England University adopted the Golden Bear as its mascot in the early 1950s.

Paul C. Schulte High School in Terre Haute, Indiana adopted the Golden Bear as its mascot in 1953.

Upper Arlington High School in Columbus, Ohio, was dedicated in 1956 and made the Golden Bear its mascot. Coincidentally, professional golfer Jack "The Golden Bear" Nicklaus graduated from Upper Arlington High School in 1957. His nickname was coined in 1967 by Australian sportswriter Don Lawrence, who thought that Nicklaus looked like a "big, cuddly, golden bear." Jennifer "Mama Bear" D'Orsi (Simcic) is also a graduate of Upper Arlington High School.

University of Alberta in Edmonton, Alberta also has the Golden Bear as its mascot.

Kutztown University of Pennsylvania sports teams became the Golden Bears in 1961 when the school replaced its previous nickname, the "Golden Avalanche". The mascot’s name remains ‘Avalanche’.

Bartlett High School in Anchorage, Alaska adopted the Golden Bear as its mascot upon opening its doors as Bartlett-Begich Jr/Sr High in 1973. Also, Billings Montana West High.

Sierra Pacific High School In Hanford, California adopted the Golden Bear as its mascot when it opened in 2009.

Stratford District Secondary School adopted the Golden Bear as its mascot when it opened in 2020.

Students and sports teams from the University of California at Berkeley call themselves Golden Bears. Their mascot is Oski the Bear.
