= Ambrose Key =

American pioneer (1829–1908)

Ambrose W. Key (27 November 1829 – 17 August 1908) was an American pioneer. He was born in Crawfordsville, Indiana, the son of George Key and his wife Rebecca Mintun. George, a native of Virginia, settled with his family in Ohio circa 1800. From there, he began a career as a trader, traveling various rivers while establishing his trade routes. In 1836, George spotted lands in Iowa which reminded him of his boyhood home in Virginia, staking a claim to what he dubbed "Virginia Grove" in Louisa County. George planted crops there in 1836 and 1837, and wintered with his family back in Montgomery County, Indiana. While raising his crops in 1838, George sent for his wife and family to come to Iowa. Rebecca hired 10 men to help her move her family of 10 children, including Ambrose, 300 miles (480 km) from Indiana to Iowa. They averaged 7 miles per day on their 45-day trek, employing three wagons and a carriage, while driving a collection of young horses, cattle, and nearly 100 head of sheep.

Ambrose purchased 80 acres (320,000 m^{2}) of government land in Louisa County during 1855, and was an established merchant in the town of Wapello by 1856. On 21 May 1859, he married Mary Jones Garrett, a native of Ohio, in Tipton, Moniteau County, Missouri. Within a year, the couple was residing in Washington County, Texas, where Ambrose was the proprietor of a general store. Ambrose also purchased the Baker and Thomson Sawmill on the San Jacinto River, and operated a sash, door, and blind factory for about 4 years. The family lived in Falls County, Texas for several years, where Ambrose bought another sawmill and started a tannery.

At the close of the Civil War, Ambrose and family spent a year in St. Louis, then relocated to Westport on the Kansas border. He carried on a general trading and freighting business from Westport for 3 years, then bought a farm in Shawnee Township of Wyandotte County, Kansas on the Gibbs road, 3 miles (4.8 km) southwest of Argentine. From 1872 until his death on 17 August 1908, Ambrose conducted a profitable business of raising fruits on his farm. He was survived by his wife and 4 children: sons Sidney D. and Joseph Francis Key, and daughters Nellie G. Key and Mrs. Gertrude Baldwin.

== See also ==
- Turner, Kansas
