= Muncie, Kansas City, Kansas =

Neighborhood in Kansas City, Kansas

Muncie
- Neighborhood
- Location within the state of Kansas
- Coordinates: 39°5′15″N 94°44′50″W
- Country: United States
- State: Kansas
- County: Wyandotte
- Time zone: UTC-6 (Central (CST))
  - Summer (DST): UTC-5 (CDT)

Muncie is a neighborhood in Kansas City, Kansas on the north bank of the Kansas River.

The area derives its name from the Munsee, which was part of the Algonquian speaking Delaware (tribe). Reverend Jesse Vogler and John Kilbuck, and 72 Christianized Munsee Indians, came to the area aboard the St. Peters. The Munsee Moravian Mission was located in the Westfield settlement. Its original location was along the Union Pacific Railroad halfway between Edwardsville and Kansas City.

On December 8, 1874, the James-Younger Gang are believed to have robbed a Kansas Pacific Railroad train of $30,000.

Grinter Place in the Grinter Heights neighborhood is on the National Register of Historic Places. A ferry that was used on the military route between Fort Leavenworth, Kansas and Fort Scott, Kansas crossed the river here.

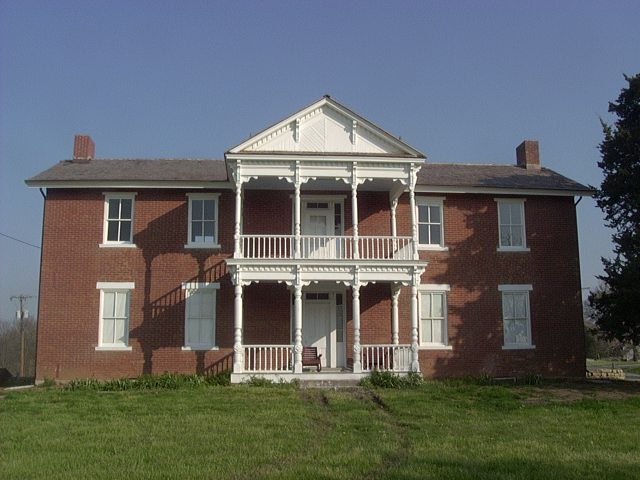
Grinter House
