= Turner High School (Kansas) =

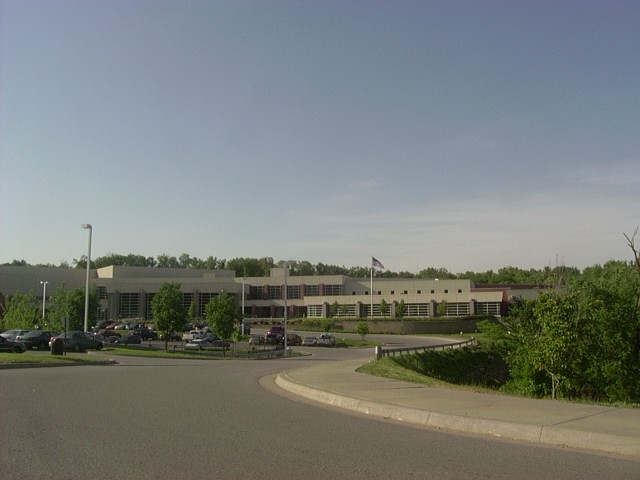

Location
- 2211 South 55th Street; Kansas City, Kansas 66106; United States; 39.060316°N 94.702621°W

Information
- School type: Public, High School
- Established: 2001, 1950s, 1924
- School board: Board Website
- School district: Turner USD 202
- CEEB code: 172960
- Principal: Mark Farrar
- Teaching staff: 74.33 (FTE)
- Grades: 9 to 12
- Gender: coed
- Enrollment: 1,134 (2023–2024)
- Student to teacher ratio: 15.26
- Hours in school day: 7 classes (8th is offered)
- Campus type: Urban
- Colors: Gold; Black
- Athletics conference: United Kansas Conference
- Mascot: Golden Bear
- Team name: (Turner) Golden Bears
- Rival: J.C. Harmon High School, Bonner Springs High School
- Website: School Website

Turner High School is a fully accredited public high school located in Kansas City, Kansas, United States. It serves students in grades 9-12, and is operated by the Turner USD 202 school district.

== History ==
Turner High School dates back to the 1920s, and it still currently stands as the only high school in the district. Turner High School was formerly located in the building that now houses the Turner Recreation Commission. In the 1950s, it moved to a new building that now houses Turner Middle School. In the late 1990s, a bond issue was passed to build a new high school facility. The new Turner High School was then built on a piece of land that was once a farm. The farm was torn down, and the new Turner High School opened its doors in 2001.

In 1958, several students from Turner High School kidnapped two boys from Washington High School in Kansas City as a prank after Washington beat Turner at a basketball game.

== Extracurricular activities ==
The Golden Bears are classified as a 5A school, which is the 2nd largest classification in Kansas according to the Kansas State High School Activities Association (KSHSAA). Turner High School has activities such as Football, Girls Basketball, Boys Basketball, Volleyball, Wrestling, Baseball, Softball, Girls Soccer, Boys Soccer, Bowling, Track and Field, Cross Country, and more.

Turner also offers many academic and athletic co-curricular and extra-curricular opportunities. An example of this would be the Greenbush Virtual Academy, a program that provides continued learning opportunities for adult high school dropouts culminating in a Turner High School diploma.

WNBA star Caitlin Clark and the Hy-Vee supermarket chain made an impact on the Turner High School girls' basketball team, the Lady Bears. The team had a low player number. Clark met the team and funded the team with $30,000, new apparel, and a 3-year supply of healthy snacks. The Lady Bears’ story of resilience and community connection was captured in a documentary and a TV commercial. It is available on the Hy-Vee YouTube Channel.

== Notable alumni ==
- Pat (Huggins) Pettey, Kansas State House of Representatives 1993–1996; Kansas Senate 2013-present. Graduate of Turner High School 1964.
- Matt Vogel, muppeteer, voice of Kermit the Frog since 2008, a 1989 graduate of Turner High School.
- Lynn Melton, member of the Kansas House of Representatives.

== See also ==
- List of high schools in Kansas
- List of unified school districts in Kansas
