= Issi Noho =

British children's book and television franchise

Issi Noho is the eponymous main character in a series of books and children's television programmes created, written and narrated by author Keith Chatfield. Issi Noho was originally published by Heinemann and Piccolo, and 52 episodes of the television programme were produced for Thames Television between 1974 and 1978.

== Premise ==
Issi Noho is a panda with magic powers. His magic results from completing the vacant square in a series of magic number squares that he inherited from his Chinese ancestors. In a magic square the numbers must come to the same total in whichever direction they are added up, horizontally, vertically or diagonally. Issi's poor arithmetic causes frequent mathematical errors, with unexpected and humorous consequences.

Issi's name comes from the middle letters of THIS SIDE UP, USE NO HOOKS. These were the words on the packing case in which he was discovered by the children, Sally and Andrew. Issi had camouflaged his packing case with branches and leaves and the children could only see the middle letters ISSI NOHO, which they took to be his name.

== Television ==
The television program showed illustrations by Edward C. Standon while the author Keith Chatfield read the story aloud. Audrey Starrett directed episodes "Singing Makes My Legs So Tired" and "Mum and Dad May Never Forgive You", both with guest vocal performances by singer James Thornton. Charles Warren directed another episode, "The Clever Middle Bit," about a maze Issi Noho creates in the children's garden.

== Books ==
- Keith Chatfield, Issi Noho (ISBN 9780948467004)
