= Winkie (novel) =

Novel by Clifford Chase

- Winkie.
- Author: Clifford Chase
- Language: English
- Publisher: Grove Press
- Publication date: 2006
- ISBN: 978-0-8021-1830-1 (first edition, hardcover)
- Dewey Decimal: 813.6
- LC Class: PS3603.H3793 W56

Winkie is a 2006 allegorical novel by Clifford Chase about a sentient teddy bear who is accused of terrorism.

== Plot ==
Winkie is a teddy bear miraculously given life and freedom of movement and speech. In the novel, Winkie's gender transforms, from being a 'she' to a 'he,' as he is passed on to different children. He is first called "Marie" in the hands of Ruth, his first owner. By then Marie was just a toy, albeit already having consciousness and feelings. Marie is then passed on to Ruth's fifth children. In the ownership of Clifford Chase, the youngest of Ruth's children and named after the author, Marie is then changed into a boy. He was called "Winkie" from then on. However, when Cliff, like the previous owners, abandons and ignores Winkie upon growing up, Winkie feels betrayed, and altogether alone, for he knows that there will be no one left to 'hug' him any more. He is left sitting on the shelf above Cliff's dresser for years until given the gift of life by some mysterious and unexplainable force.

Winkie then decides to go out into the world, to get away from the humans that betrayed him. He shatters the bedroom window with a book, and climbing out onto the tree outside, is able to fulfill the first of his three wishes: freedom. He continues to fulfill the other two, with nothing else to do. Noticing some brown pods underneath a tree, Winkie eats them, fulfilling his second wish. After eating, he then proceeds to defecate, "doo-doo" as he calls it – his third wish. Winkie then goes to the other lawns of the neighborhood, making his "special mark."

On his twenty-fifth lawn, Winkie meets an old woman. Here he is torn between accepting the sweet croons of the woman and turning his back on her. Anger boiling inside him, he chooses the latter, scaring the woman away as he yelps "Heenh! Heenh! Heenh!" He then decides to go to the forest, trying to distract himself and forget the encounter with the old woman. After two days of walking and crawling, he arrives. Here he eats more berries. He falls asleep on a rock, only to be wakened by an excruciating pain in his stomach. Rolling over and over, Winkie feels as if his seams will burst open, only to find that the pain is intensifying. At its peak, however, it disappears. Thinking that the stomachache was brought by the berries he ate the night before, he turns to look at the terrible mess he made, only to find that, instead of "doo-doo," there was a baby "Winkie".

For months, father-mother and daughter live peacefully in the forest, eating berries and sometimes from garbage cans nearby. One day, Baby Winkie is kidnapped by a mad English professor living in the woods. The professor is a terrorist, making bombs and mailing them to other terrorists. He kidnapped Baby Winkie for he fell in love with her innocence and purity, only to be disappointed to find that she speaks his language of books. For months Winkie is distraught, lying down on the ground until vines began to crawl around him. One evening, he hears a hum which he is sure came from Baby Winkie. He runs after the sound, only to find her, glowing and shining brightly, in the hut where the professor lives. Baby Winkie then disappears, leaving Winkie alone and depressed. He resolves to live in the hut, acknowledging that his daughter is forever gone yet still hoping that she will return. He disposes of the professor, who died before Baby Winkie disappeared.

In the days after her disappearance, Baby Winkie appears before Winkie in a dream. "Think back," she says, and then is gone again. After three days, Winkie is arrested by the police. In the months following this apparition and his imprisonment, Winkie tries to remember everything, from his life with Ruth until his hearings in court, and is able to find meaning in his being and existence. His trial, led by the insecure and stuttering Charles Unwin against the prosecutor and most of the court audience, is not as Winkie expects. With 9,678 charges – of which he knew nothing – Winkie felt that he would lose. But when Judy, the prosecutor's assistant, sees that Winkie really is innocent and reveals that they are withholding evidence deliberately, Winkie regains hope. In the end, the jury reaches deadlock. Winkie, in the meantime, is free after the Free Winkie Committee pays for his bail. He travels to Cairo, Egypt with Françoise – a lesbian cleaning woman who mended him after he was shot during his arrest in the forest – where he begins to accept and understand why everything has happened to him.

== Characters ==
- Marie/Winkie
- Baby Winkie
- Ruth Chase
- Clifford Chase
- Françoise
- Charles Unwin

== Reception ==
The Cooperative de Mai in France wrote that Winkie presents a "new and critical look at our society and offers a wonderful opportunity for questioning and denunciation. Original and fanciful, this novel sends a sarcastic nod to the absurdities and excesses of the American judicial system. The Dallas Morning News praised the character of Winkie, saying that he is "one [of] the most memorable stuffed animals since the Velveteen Rabbit." Time Out Chicago praised Clifford's writing, saying that "what elevates Chase's work above simple cleverness is the magic of the prose itself, which derives beauty from all things." In a starred review, Publishers Weekly said "This book is way too odd to be sentimental, and its political sensibility shuttles easily between the cartoonish and the shrewd. Chase puts himself in the same league as David Sedaris with this unclassifiable debut.

The novel was named a must-read selection by Entertainment Weekly, a notable book by The New York Times, and a finalist for a Borders Original Voices Award. Booklist also named the novel as one of the ten best science fiction and fantasy books of the year.

However, not all reviews were positive. USA Today said Winkie's satire was only "surface-deep," adding "Chase might have a funny Saturday Night Live sketch here, but it isn't a novel."

Literary agent Donald Maass has held Winkie up as a prime example of political satire for new writers, stating that "the humor isn't in the teddy bear itself. Hilarity springs from the bear's too-real situation."

Since its publication, Winkie has been translated into nearly a dozen languages.

== Adaptations ==
In 2011, Winkie was adapted into an off Broadway play at 59E59 Theaters by the Godlight Theater Company. The play was adapted by Matt Pelfrey and directed by Joe Tantalo.
