= Old Bear Stories =

British children's stop-motion television show

- Genre: Stop motion puppet animation
- Based on: Old Bear and Friends by Jane Hissey
- Story by: Jane Hissey
- Directed by: Kevin Griffiths; Liz Whitaker
- Narrated by: Anton Rodgers
- Composer: Paul Castle
- Country of origin: United Kingdom
- Original language: English
- No. of series: 3
- No. of episodes: 41

Production
- Executive producer: Peter Gillbe
- Producer: Richard Randolph
- Editors: Nick Follows; Nick Aleck
- Running time: 10 mins 20 mins (special episodes)
- Production company: Optomen

Original release
- Network: ITV (Carlton); Channel 5
- Release: 22 September 1993 – 23 December 1997

Old Bear Stories is a British stop-motion animated children's television series based on the Old Bear and Friends books by Jane Hissey. It was first broadcast on 22 September 1993 and ran for three series until 24th December 1997, concluding with a double-length Christmas special. In total, 41 episodes were produced. The series won the BAFTA for Best Children's Programme in 1993.

The series was produced by Optomen Television in association with Ealing Animation and Carlton Television, and was originally broadcast in the United Kingdom on ITV. Episodes have subsequently been repeated on Channel 5 in the UK. The series was also broadcast internationally, including in the United States, Canada, Australia, South Africa and several European countries, and was screened on armed forces television via BFBS.

Episodes of the series were released on VHS by Carlton Video.

== Plot ==
In a playroom that is home to a variety of sentient toys, their wise and caring leader, Old Bear, has long been absent after being put into the loft and forgotten. After the toys rescue him and bring him back to the playroom, Old Bear once again becomes their most respected toy and guides his friends in their many adventures, both in the playroom and in the garden.

== Characters ==
- Old Bear – An elderly dusty teddy bear. He was put up in the attic when he reached an advanced age, but was rescued by the other toys. They now look up to him as a fearless, yet wise, leader.
- Bramwell Brown – A wise and intelligent teddy bear, often considered second to Old Bear. He often likes to cook things for the other toys.
- Duck – a gloomy and pessimistic but amiable toy duck. He sometimes wishes he could fly, and he does not like to get his feet wet.
- Rabbit – An impulsive and energetic toy rabbit. He enjoys jumping, and has talents for magic tricks and acrobatic performances.
- Little Bear – A small white bear who wears overly baggy orange-red trousers. Being the youngest of all the toys, he is very enthusiastic and inquisitive, rather like a young child. He sometimes has good ideas for solving problems or playing games.
- Jolly Tall – A kind and loyal toy giraffe who, despite his height, suffers from acrophobia – he says his head thinks it is high enough already.
- Sailor – a sailor doll who enjoys sailing in his toy boat.
- Zebra – A female toy zebra, who likes giving the other toys rides in her cart.
- Hoot – A toy owl living in the attic. She originally had a nest made of a bunch of socks that didn't match, until Little Bear gave her an old bobble hat to use instead. She doesn't often appear as, like all owls, she sleeps during the day. However, she sometimes appears at night to help people, such as when she rescued Little Bear from the snowy rooftop one Christmas Eve.
- Ruff – A toy dog that resembles a Fox Terrier. He had been left in the garden next door, as found nobody seemed to want him due to his bouncy nature. When he first visited the toys, they gave him his name due to the barking noise he made. They also gave him a whole week of birthdays, as he believed he was seven years old but had never counted or celebrated a birthday before. At the end of the week, he was afraid that the toys would want him to leave; but to his delight, they asked him to stay permanently.
- Dog – A toy black Scottish Terrier who likes to bury his rubber bones in some plant pots.
- Camel – A kindly toy camel who is almost as tall as Jolly Tall. She once tried to use Little Bear's trousers as hump warmers.
- Cat – A sleepy toy cat who likes to nap in any place she finds.
- Rabbit's cousin – A female cousin of Rabbit, who occasionally stays with the toys. She wears a straw hat, seems to like to cause mischief and does not like cleaning.
- The dolls – A family of three dolls (a father, mother and daughter) who live in a dolls' house in a corner of the playroom.

== Episodes ==
=== Series overview ===
Series	Episodes	Originally released	
Series	Episodes	First released	Last released
1	13	3 October 1993	21 December 1993
2	13	18 September 1994	29 November 1994
3	13	4 September 1996	27 November 1996

=== Series 1 (1993) ===
No. overall	No. in series	Title	Original release date
1	1	"Old Bear"	3 October 1993
Bramwell Brown remembers his Old Bear, who, a long time ago, was put away in the attic for safe keeping, Bramwell and his friends decide to get Old Bear back down to the playroom but it's a long way up to the attic and they don't have a ladder. The friends try some dramatic and heroic rescue attempts, but nothing quite works until they remember the little toy plane. Little Bear finally manages to get up to the attic safely but how will he bring Old Bear down again? Luckily Bramwell Brown has a plan...
2	2	"Little Bear Lost"	10 October 1993
Old Bear has just finished packing a picnic basket full of food when Little Bear dashes in, followed by the other toys. They are all playing hide-and-seek but, unfortunately, they have forgotten to choose a seeker. Old Bear agrees to look for them and soon finds everyone except Little Bear. After they have searched high and low they decide to eat their picnic and then search again. But a surprise awaits them when they open the lid of the picnic basket!
3	3	"There Were Five In A Bed"	17 October 1993
The bed where all the toys sleep is getting rather crowded. When Old Bear falls out and bumps his head the toys decide it would be a good idea to try and find somewhere else to sleep. They try all sorts of strange sleeping places; drawers, baskets, bowls and hammocks but there always seems to be a problem. In the end Old Bear comes up with the perfect solution and, at last, there is plenty of room for them all to sleep.
4	4	"Jolly Tall"	24 October 1993
A mysterious box arrives in the playroom. After approaching it cautiously the toys discover it contains a new friend, Jolly Tall the giraffe. With Jolly still inside, everyone sets to work to turn his box into a cosy house for him. There is a problem though; Jolly is too tall to get out of the door! Using a toy crane, the friends finally manage to rescue Jolly and Jolly, in return, performs a rescue of his own. In the end the toys find that something Bramwell has been knitting all week turns out to be the perfect present for their new playmate.
5	5	"Little Bear's Trousers"	31 October 1993
Little Bear wakes up to find he has lost his trousers. After visiting his friends, one by one, he discovers they have all been using the trousers in very untrousery ways; as a sail for a boat, as a skiing hat, to carry bricks and as a flag. Little Bear is quite upset when he finally finds Bramwell Brown using the red trousers as an icing bag! But the cake Bramwell has made saves the day when it becomes a "Trousers Day" cake and Little Bear finally gets his beloved trousers back.
6	6	"The Circus"	7 November 1993
There has been a party in the playroom and the toys can see that there is lots of food left on the table, but it is just out of reach. Little Bear explores underneath the tablecloth and discovers that it looks just like a circus tent; a starting point for a wonderful new game. Many of the toys want to perform in the circus and others come to watch. It is Rabbit who turns out to be the star of the show and he, accidentally, solves the problem of the out-of-reach food.
7	7	"The Rainy Day"	14 November 1993
It is a wet afternoon and the rain is coming in the playroom window and dripping through a hole in the dolls' house roof. The poor Doll family don't know what to do; all their things are getting wet. The toys dream up lots of ingenious ways of mending the hole, but nothing really works until Little Bear find a solution quite by chance. While standing on the roof, clutching his umbrella, he accidentally falls through the leaky hole and the Doll family are delighted with the surprising repair.
8	8	"The Fancy Dress Parade"	21 November 1993
Old Bear and Bramwell Brown find an old basket full of bits and pieces and all the toys decide to have a fancy dress competition. Old Bear agrees to be the judge. The toys have great fun making their costumes and they parade them proudly in front of Old Bear. The parade starts well but soon ends in chaos. Luckily Old Bear finds a way to make sure that everyone's a winner in the end.
9	9	"Little Bear's Big Race"	28 November 1993
Little Bear finds Bramwell Brown examining a piece of tinfoil. Together they make some silver cups, and this gives Rabbit an idea. he suggests they have a sports day and use the cups as trophies for the winners of each race. They have a sock race, a potato and spoon race and a six-legged race. Little Bear begins to feel rather sad because he is sure he won't win a prize; he is just too small to beat the others. However, his friends find a way to cheer him up and in the end, he has a surprising bit of luck.
10	10	"The Apple Tree"	5 December 1993
Little Bear decides to grow an apple tree as a surprise for Old Bear. With help from his friends he manages to plant an apple pip in a flower pot. He is disappointed to hear that, despite watering it and keeping it warm, his pip could take years to grow into a tree. However, while he is waiting, Bramwell Brown finds a way that they can help Little Bear make an instant tree that will really surprise Old Bear.
11	11	"The Winter Picnic"	12 December 1993
One cold morning Old Bear decides all the toys should go for a picnic. They pack lots of hot food, wrap up warmly and pull the picnic basket to the top of a hill on a little cart. After enjoying the food and playing lots of games they realise how cold they are and climb into the basket to keep warm. They imagine their surprise when the picnic ends with a rather bumpy, and very exciting, journey home.
12	12	"Jolly Snow"	19 December 1993
Jolly Tall has never seen snow and he wishes it would snow today. The other toys try to find ways to show him what snow is like. They all have fun making pretend snow out of flour, paper decorations, bubbles and feathers. Bramwell even makes snowflake biscuits. They are so busy enjoying themselves they almost forget to look out of the window. What a surprise they have when they do.
13	13	"The Doll's House Christmas"	21 December 1993
Old Bear and his friends have decorated the playroom for Christmas. But Little Bear and Bramwell suddenly notice the dolls' house, forgotten in a dark corner of the playroom, it has no Christmas decorations at all. The two friends have an idea and while Rabbit and Duck entertain the Doll family, the others all work quickly to decorate their house with a tiny Christmas tree and lots of miniature decorations. The dolls have a wonderful surprise when they return and declare it is the best Christmas they have ever had.

=== Series 2 ===
No. overall	No. in series	Title	Original release date
14	1	"Ruff"	6 September 1994
The toys meet a new friend, a bouncy dog, named Ruff. When they discover that he has never had a birthday party they quickly set about putting things right. They decide to hold an all-week birthday to celebrate all the birthdays Ruff has missed. Each day brings different birthday fun; parties, presents, games and birthday cakes. And on the seventh birthday they give Ruff the present he has always wanted.
15	2	"The Play"	13 September 1994
Old Bear is reading a story to his friends in the garden when Jolly Tall gives them an idea of putting on a play. The toys make a stage on the grass and perform their own, rather special, version of "Goldilocks and the Three Bears". Little Bear doesn't want to be "Baby Bear" until he realises there will be real porridge in the play. With Rabbit as a rather over-enthusiastic Goldilocks and three bowls of porridge on the table, just about anything could happen.
16	3	"The Boat Race"	20 September 1994
Old Bear and his friends are playing in the garden. As Bramwell is making pirate hats with scraps of newspaper, the toys think it would be a good idea to have a boat race. First of all, the toys have to build their boats, (although Sailor already has his own) then, when they are ready, they launch them in the stream and the race begins. It doesn't go quite according to plan but a spectacular air/stream rescue by Rabbit saves the day and it isn't the biggest boat that wins the race.
17	4	"Jigsaw"	27 September 1994
The toys are searching everywhere for a missing piece of jigsaw puzzle. Their search leads them all over the house and they find all sorts of interesting things they were not looking for. When they find some plates that belong to the Dolls' House dolls, Mrs Doll invites them to tea to thank them. When tea is served everyone is amazed to see what Mrs Doll is using as a tray.
18	5	"Little Bear's Book"	4 October 1994
Old Bear promises to read Little Bear a very special bedtime story because he has been so helpful. Little Bear is very excited as he gets ready for bed but then he can't find Old Bear anywhere. It seems that everyone else is also too busy to read him a story. Little Bear is very disappointed, but he needn't worry; he eventually discovers Old Bear and the reason why all his friends have been so busy. And his bedtime story really is extra special.
19	6	"The Birthday Band"	11 October 1994
It it Old Bear's birthday and the toys decide to surprise him with a special, musical treat. Everyone sets out to find or make an instrument and soon they are making wonderful music. Old Bear is delighted with his surprise and the only is that Bramwell has managed to lose his special birthday buns. However, all is revealed when Little Bear's big bass drum rolls out of control.
20	7	"Hot and Spotty"	18 October 1994
When Duck wakes up covered in mysterious red spots, the day's plan; to paint the garden gate have to be postponed. The toys think up many different ways to entertain Duck and help him forget his spots. Duck thoroughly enjoys having so many special treats until, by chance, Little Bear discovers the unexpected cause of the spots. Perhaps Duck is not unwell after all.
21	8	"Hoot"	25 October 1994
Little Bear is woken in the middle of the night by a crash and a "whooo" noise. Is it a ghost? He wakes the others and together they try to find out who made the noise. At last they meet a little white owl whose nest of socks has fallen down from the top of the wardrobe. The toys find their new friend an even better nest and Little Bear has a rather unexpected night-time flight. When the toys wake in the morning they find that another mystery has been solved in the night.
22	9	"Ruff Follows His Nose"	1 November 1994
Ruff sets off in pursuit of an irresistible smell. Little Bear follows him and together they search high and low for Ruff's mysterious smell. Ruff's nose leads them all over the house and he discovers plenty of smelly things but not the one he is looking for. However, in the end, with the other toys' help he finally tracks down what he has been looking for in the most unlikely of places.
23	10	"Spring Clean"	8 November 1994
Dusty windows remind Old Bear that it's time for a little spring-cleaning. All the toys lends a hand and find that cleaning can be fun. They even tie dusters to their feet and skate away the dust. Old Bear's suggestion; that they try a little airborne dusting, works well at first but soon it looks as if it might end up with a rather bumpy landing. Luckily, Little Bear's clever plan brings them safely back down to earth.
24	11	"Old Bear's Chair"	15 November 1994
The toys are having a wonderful time using Old Bear's special chair as a slide. When Ruff has a go, it collapses and, however hard they try, they can't put it back together again. They decide it must be broken and are worried what Old Bear will say when he finds out. However, when at last they pluck up courage of confess, Old Bear shows them how easy it is to mend a deck chair...if only they know how!
25	12	"Market Day"	22 November 1994
While searching for treasure in the sandpit Rabbit discovers a hoard of yellow counters. Bramwell Brown suggests they use the counters as money. They decide to have a market and all make their own stalls to sell odds and ends. They have great fun buying things from each other with the counters and are puzzled when Old Bear buys lots of containers from Rabbit's stall. The mystery is soon solved when Old Bear teaches the toys another game they can play with their counters.
26	13	"The Car"	29 November 1994
It looks as if nobody wants to ride in Zebra's little wooden cart now the toys have seen Bramwell Brown's big, red car. But the car likes to go very fast and the lack of brakes makes it really rather dangerous. After much excitement and a few disasters, all the friends agree that Zebra's little cart might be, after all, a much safer and more comfortable ride.

=== Series 3 (1996) ===
No. overall	No. in series	Title	Original release date
27	1	"Hoot and the Mystery Eggs"	4 September 1996
Rabbit finds some eggs in an old flowerpot while playing with Little Bear in the garden shed. When no bird returns to sit on them the toys decide to recruit Hoot for the job of hatching the eggs. Hoot is very demanding and the plan proves to be hard work for everyone. However, with the help of Old Bear's book, Little Bear eventually discovers exactly what kind of eggs they are trying to hatch. Maybe Hoot won't be needed after all.
28	2	"The Clock"	11 September 1996
Little Bear is sure it must be teatime but Old Bear isn't so sure because the clock has stopped. While Old Bear looks for the key to wind up the clock, the other toys, convinced the clock must be broken, try to mend it. Unfortunately they just make things much worse until Old Bear arrives to try and put things right. They still haven't found the key though, but now the clock does seem to be trying to tell them something...
29	3	"The Castle"	18 September 1996
When Little Bear and Duck are sorting through their farm set they find an old piece of castle wall. This gives them an idea and with the help of the other toys they create a new castle complete with a moat and drawbridge. Old Bear explains what sort of games they can play with a castle and they find a clever way to divide themselves into teams to play. With Little Bear firing paper cannon balls from the battlements, it look as though it will be hard for Bramwell's team to invade the castle but he has a very clever plan.
30	4	"The Colour Chase"	25 September 1996
The toys are having a drawing competition and when it's finished they want to play another game. Old Bear suggests they have a competition to find objects that match the colour of the pencil they have chosen. They all set off in search of coloured objects that match their pencils. Little Bear is disappointed that he picked brown of his colour because he can't find many brown things but gets a double surprise as the colour chase comes to an end.
31	5	"Little Bear's Snowmen"	2 October 1996
It's winter and snow has covered everything in the garden. The toys have fun playing on a sledge and building a wonderful snowman. Little Bear is worried that the birds must be very hungry as their food is hidden under the snow. At lunchtime the toys all go inside to make bread snowmen to go with Old Bear's delicious soup. While they are waiting for them to cook, they tell each other food stories and become more and more hungry. At last the bread is ready but Little Bear has not forgotten that the birds need feeding too and he has a really good idea.
32	6	"The Painting"	9 October 1996
Old Bear is busy redecorating the bathroom. Rabbit thinks decorating looks like fun and gets the other toys to come and lend a hand. The toys are very enthusiastic about painting but soon there is paint everything but on the walls. Old Bear thinks of a way that everyone can help without making a mess and in the end they are all delighted with the result!
33	7	"Duck Tries to Fly"	16 October 1996
Little Bear and Rabbit find Duck trying to improve his flying skills. They decide to try to help him but their various contraptions don't seem to be too successful; even Little Bear ends up flying further than Duck. Duck is beginning to think that flying is not such a good idea when Sailor offers him two old sails from his boat. The triangles of cloth give Duck a good idea when the toys all go out in the garden they do see a bit of flying after all.
34	8	"The Jolly Dragon"	23 October 1996
Old Bear is reading Little Bear a very exciting book about a dragon. When Old Bear explains that there aren't any real dragons, Little Bear decides to pretend to be a real dragon living in a cave, just like the one in the book. But it isn't until the other toys arrive that he discovers how realistic his dragon mask is. It takes Old Bear to sort out the problem of just too many dragons.
35	9	"Rabbit and the Visitor"	30 October 1996
Rabbit's rather rude cousin turns up unexpectedly and decides to stay with the toys for a few days. After a large picnic tea, where she eats most of the food, the toys get ready for bed. She puts on her pyjamas and climbs into the bed, leaving no room for Rabbit. The next morning the toys decide having a guest is not as much fun as they thought and Old Bear thinks of a plan that might persuade her to go home.
36	10	"Little Bear's Cold Day"	6 November 1996
It is a very cold day and all the toys are trying to think of ways to keep warm. They play various games that involve running, skipping and rowing but as soon as they stop they feel cold again. Zebra even suggests that they hibernate under a pile of leaves. Ruff thinks that a game of catch would be a better idea. However, it isn't until they are in the middle of the game that they realise just why they have been feeling so cold all day.
37	11	"Ruff and the Big Wheel"	13 November 1996
When Little Bear accidentally breaks a wheel of Zebra's cart, Old Bear finds a box of shiny, round lids to mend it. There are enough lids left over to make a lovely go-cart. When it is finished it turns out that Ruff is too big and needs a bigger cart of his own. But there are only two wheels left. Old Bear hunts in the cupboard under the stairs and find a wheel that is much bigger than all the others.
38	12	"The Birthday Camp"	20 November 1996
It is Little Bear's birthday and the toys have given him a tent. He is so excited that he wants to sleep in it that night. Old Bear isn't so sure but Rabbit volunteers to look after him, so they all go out in the garden to put up the tent. As it gets dark Little Bear and Rabbit discover that they are still rather hungry but they have forgotten to bring a torch to find the food. However a night-time visitor comes to their rescue and the birthday goes on getting better long into the night.
39	13	"The Treasure Hunt"	27 November 1996
It is a lovely warm day and the toys are out in the garden. Duck is weeding, Bramwell is planting seeds and Jolly Tall is watering. The only ones who aren't helping are Little Bear and Ruff who are much too busy playing. But Bramwell has an idea, he sends them on a treasure hunt which, to their surprise, ends up with them helping in the garden too!

=== Christmas Specials ===
No. overall	No. in series	Title	Original release date
14	14	"The Perfect Presents"	24 December 1993
When the excitement of Christmas seems to be over, Old Bear finds a surprising way to remind the other toys of the fun they have had over the festive seasons. This compilation of "The Winter Picnic", "Jolly Snow" and "The Dolls' House Christmas" has added extras to keep everyone happy, including Old Bear.
41	14	"Little Bear and the Christmas Star"	24 December 1997

== Crew ==
Series 1

- Narrated by Anton Rodgers
- Written by Jane Hissey
- Animation: Humphrey Leadbitter, Fin Leadbitter
- Music: Paul Castle
- Video Editors: Nick Follows, Simon Brook, Chris Reynolds
- Dubbing Mixer: Nigel Glynn-Davies
- Puppet Makers: Val Jones, Monique Brown, Alix Hardwood
- Sets: Colin Armitage
- Props: Pippa Randolph, Sue Phillips
- Executive Producer: Peter Gillbe
- Producer: Richard Randolph
- Director: Kevin Griffiths
- Characters © Jane Hissey, Licensed by Random House (UK) Ltd.
- An Optomen Television Production in association with Ealing Animation for Carlton Television
- © Carlton Television 1993

Series 2

- Narrated by Anton Rodgers
- Written by Jane Hissey
- Music by Paul Castle
- Animated by Tobias Fouracre, Bryn Jones, Aziz Samuels, Humphrey Leadbitter, Dan Ryan
- Puppet Makers: Alix Hardwood, Helen Rench
- Sets: Graeme Owen
- Props: Pippa Randolph
- Production Assistant: Jilly Clarke
- Video Editor: Nick Follows
- Producers: Peter Gillbe, Richard Randolph
- Assistant Director: Liz Whitaker
- Director: Kevin Griffiths
- Characters © Jane Hissey, Licensed by Random House (UK) Ltd.
- An Optomen Television Production in association with Ealing Animation
- © Carlton Television 1994

Series 3

- Narrated by Anton Rodgers
- Written by Jane Hissey
- Music by Paul Castle
- Animated by Tobias Fouracre, Geoff Walker, Humphrey Leadbitter, Dan Ryan, Liz Whitaker, Rowan Leadbitter
- Puppet Makers: Alix Hardwood, Helen Rench
- Sets: Graeme Owen
- Props: Pippa Randolph, Fin Leadbitter, Geoff Walker, Donna Joy
- Production Assistants: Jilly Clarke, Geoff Walker, Lynne Pritchard
- Video Editor: Nick Follows, Sally Fryer, Nick Aleck
- Producers: Peter Gillbe, Richard Randolph
- Assistant Director: Liz Whitaker
- Director: Kevin Griffiths
- Characters © Jane Hissey, Licensed by Random House (UK) Ltd.
- An Optomen Television Production in association with Ealing Animation
- © Carlton UK Television 1996, 1997

== Theme music ==
The theme tune was composed by Paul Castle and consists of the lyrics:

Please read us a story Old Bear, we'll all gather round

Dear Old Bear.

Sit in your favourite chair,

We'll sit all around, all around dear Old Bear.

The harmony vocals were provided by Alison Goldfrapp of the band Goldfrapp.

== Awards ==
The series received several awards:

- 1995 Chicago International Children's Film Festival - Outstanding Achievement Award
- 1994 Royal Television Society - Best Children's Series
- 1993 BAFTA - Best Children's Programme
- 1993 New York Film Festival - Gold Medal
- 1993 Chicago International Film Festival - Silver Plaque

== See also ==
- Old Bear and Friends
- Jane Hissey
