= Jane Hissey =

British artist

Jane Hissey (born 1952) is a British author and illustrator of children's books. She is best known for her series of children's books Old Bear and Friends, which became the basis for a BAFTA award-winning television series Old Bear Stories, episodes of which were released on VHS by Carlton Video.

== Biography ==
Hissey was born in Norwich and attended Norwich High School for Girls. She studied Design and Illustration at Brighton. She taught art at a sixth form college until the birth of her first child. Hissey and her husband Ivan live in East Sussex. They have three children, Owen, Alison and Ralph.

== Old Bear ==
Hissey has written that "Old Bear" was given to her as a baby by her grandmother. During her childhood he was a main focus of her games, and when she was an adult he provided the inspiration for her first illustrated book. He was later joined by other soft toy characters. In 1986 her Old Bear was published, and made it into Booklist's "Editor's Choice" list for children's books for that year; in an earlier starred review, Barbara Elleman praised Hissey's use of perspective, texture, and colours.

== Other books ==
- Hoot 1996 - the toys of a bedroom come alive at night
