= Hidy and Howdy =

Official mascots of the 1988 Winter Olympics in Calgary, Alberta

Mascots of the 1988 Winter Olympics (Calgary)
- Significance: Twin polar bears wearing western/cowboy style outfits named after the country way for saying "greetings"

Hidy (left) and Howdy (right) in costume.

Hidy and Howdy were a pair of anthropomorphic polar bear siblings who wore cowboy hats and were the official mascots of the 1988 Winter Olympics in Calgary, Alberta, Canada. Olympic officials describe the polar bears as "lovable, huggable, and truly Canadian", and they have remained well-liked by locals in the decades after the Olympics. Students of Bishop Carroll High School served as performers during Hidy and Howdy's four years of activity. The bears retired from public life after the closing ceremonies, reappearing only once to film a cameo appearance in the 1993 movie Cool Runnings, which is based on the Calgary Olympics.

== History ==
The Calgary Zoo sponsored a contest to determine the names of the bears. In 1984, 21-year-old Kim Johnstone beat nearly 7000 entries with her response of "Hidy and Howdy", an idea she got after watching the Stampede rodeo on TV. Her submission was selected over an identical "Hidy and Howdy" response because she had added "The Welcome Bears". Johnstone won $200, T-shirts, and tickets to the opening ceremony to witness Hidy and Howdy’s Olympic debut.

Frequently called the "Welcome Bears", Hidy and Howdy were designed by Calgary artist Sheila Scott for $34,000 and made their first public appearance in 1984 in Sarajevo, site of the previous Olympic Games.

=== Physical mascot operations ===
Amid Olympic preparations and activities from 1984 to 1988, 22 sets of Hidy and Howdy costumes were stored in a office space in southwest Calgary called the "Bear Cave". Volunteers, mostly from the local Bishop Carroll High School, operated the costumes.

15 “bearkeepers” worked in daily shifts to repair and clean the costumes, which absorbed large amounts of sweat and smells such as like pancake breakfast scents and cigarettes. Certain damage required more serious repair or intervention from the bearkeepers. In noted separate incidents, the entire front of a Howdy costume was ripped open by excited children in Greece, and an intoxicated person in Vancouver punched off Hidy’s head.

Lane Kranenburg, a former police officer who led a beer trucking company, let the Alberta's Olympic Committee's mascot division, which involved a team as large as 140 people. In 1987, Kranenburg traveled with the costumed bears to Greece to receive the Olympic flame, then traveled around Canada for 88 days prior to the 1988 Winter Olympics opening ceremony. He called Hidy and Howdy "the most successful Olympic mascots ever, winter or summer."

=== Legacy and "Welcome to Calgary" signs ===
Following the end of Olympic Games, the costumes in good condition were sent to either the International Olympic Committee museum in Lausanne, Switzerland, or the Canadian Olympic Hall of Fame. Other costumes were "retired". Gladys Serifino, curator of the Olympic Hall of Fame and Museum, said "some of the mascots from other Olympics have been pretty awful, and ours were really great."

The Welcome Bears were a treasured piece of Calgary culture among residents. "Welcome to Calgary" signs featured an image of Hidy and Howdy. In 2000, one of the signs (near Canada Olympic Park on Barlow Trail and 16th Avenue) was removed, prompting backlash from Albertans including the Premier, and former Calgary mayor during the Olympics, Ralph Klein. Additional controversy arose in 2007 when the Calgary city council approved a request from transportation officials to replace remaining Hidy and Howdy signs. Upon the signs' removal they were "respectfully transported" to Canada Olympic Park and their replacements featured a "Heart of the New West" logo in place of the bears image. "It went from a very friendly welcome to a very unfriendly sign" said Kranenburg. Former Canadian Football League commissioner Doug Mitchell lamented the removal, saying "I don’t really agree with living in the past, but this is such a great legacy."

Kranenburg questioned the decision for the 2010 Vancouver Winter Olympics to have three mascots, saying "I think people are going to have trouble identifying with them. In my opinion, they've gotten very convoluted."

Preceded by Sam	Olympic mascot Hidy and Howdy; Calgary 1988	Succeeded by Hodori
