= List of Beastars characters =

Some characters of the series. (From left to right) Gohin, Haru, Jack, Juno, Legoshi and Louis

The Beastars manga series features an extensive cast of characters created by Paru Itagaki.

== Main characters ==
=== Legoshi ===
Voiced by: Chikahiro Kobayashi (Japanese); Jonah Scott (English)

Legoshi (レゴシ, Regoshi) is a towering gray wolf and a second-year student at Cherryton Academy. A gentle and reserved member of the drama club's stage crew, he conceals his intimidating traits to coexist with his herbivorous classmates. Legoshi becomes invested in uncovering the truth behind the murder of his schoolmate, Tem. This investigation intensifies his internal conflict regarding his carnivorous nature and his predatory instincts, which are further complicated by his growing attachment to Haru. Legoshi was raised primarily by his Komodo dragon grandfather, Gosha, and possesses inherited traits such as distinctive reptilian eyes and an immunity to Komodo dragon venom.

Itagaki had first conceptualized a wolf character while she attended junior high school; the design ideas remained similar, but over time she had different ideas for the character's story. Itagaki stated that she chose to make a wolf character as their similarity to dogs make them familiar to readers and that wolves' "sneaking around" makes them "cute". The name "Legoshi" refers to actor Bela Lugosi while she used Mathieu Amalric as a model for Legoshi's face. She stated "I sometimes think of Kenichi Matsuyama when I'm drawing the body."

=== Haru ===
Voiced by: Sayaka Senbongi (Japanese); Lara Jill Miller (English)

Haru (ハル), a third-year, is the lone member of Cherryton's gardening club and general outcast of the school due to her promiscuity. As a white dwarf rabbit, she often finds herself being treated as a fragile individual by society and wants to be validated as a person; she feels that having sex is the only way she can feel in control of herself. Haru tends to keep people at a distance, even those like Legoshi and Louis who wish to become closer with her.

=== Louis ===
Voiced by: Yūki Ono (Japanese); Griffin Puatu (English)

Louis (ルイ, Rui) is a red deer who is the star actor of Cherryton's drama club. He is a third-year student and 18 years old at the start of the story, Prideful and confident, Louis dreams of becoming the next Beastar. He tends to look down upon those around him and assert his dominance even as an herbivore surrounded by carnivores. Though typically manipulative for his own desires, Louis has shown compassion and respect, especially with Legoshi, that evolves over the course of the story. He has been romantically entangled with Haru.

Itagaki gives the character a "feminine" appearance, and has said that as of Volume 2 he "is the most difficult character ... to draw" due to issues in making him show emotional characteristics, adding that she did not have difficulty drawing the actual parts of the character. Itagaki stated that she chose the name "Louis" due to its upper class connotations.

=== Juno ===
Voiced by: Atsumi Tanezaki (Japanese); Lauren Landa (English)

Juno (ジュノ) is a gray wolf who is a first-year student and new member of the drama club. She falls in love with Legoshi at first sight after he protects her from bullies, having heard of him prior to meeting him. She is determined to win his heart and become a Beastar alongside him, to create a new peaceful era for all carnivores together.

=== Gohin ===
Voiced by: Akio Ōtsuka (Japanese); Keith Silverstein (English)

Gohin (ゴウヒン, Gōhin) is a giant panda who works as a psychiatrist and back-alley doctor, treating and rehabilitating carnivores whose predatory instincts overtake them. He first encounters Legoshi when he passes out in the Black Market, and at first assumes that Legoshi is one of many carnivores succumbing to their feral instincts. He soon develops a friendship with Legoshi, eventually becoming his mentor.

== Cherryton Academy ==
=== Cherryton Academy students ===
Jack (ジャック, Jakku)
Voiced by: Junya Enoki (Japanese); Ben Diskin (English)
Jack is a Labrador Retriever and the closest friend of Legoshi. The two have been acquainted since childhood. Known for his amiable disposition, Jack consistently demonstrates unwavering support for Legoshi, prioritizing his well-being above all else. At one point, upon learning that Labrador Retrievers were the result of genetic engineering through the modification of wolf DNA during the Carni-Herbi War, he experiences profound distress and briefly contemplates suicide by consuming onions. However, he ultimately refrains from acting on these intentions.
Bill (ビル, Biru)
Voiced by: Takaaki Kojima (Japanese); Kaiji Tang (English)
Bill is a Bengal tiger and second-year student at Cherryton Academy. He is also a member of the drama club's acting division and desires to become the next Beastar in order to prove the worth of all carnivores. He even comes to view Legoshi as a rival in terms of acting skill.
Collot (コロ, Koro)
Voiced by: Takeo Ōtsuka (Japanese); Kyle McCarley (English)
An Old English Sheepdog and friend of Legoshi's who lives in the same dorm.
Voss (ボス, Bosu)
Voiced by: Yoshiyuki Shimozuma (Japanese); Kylen Deporter (English)
A fennec fox and friend of Legoshi's who lives in the same dorm.
Miguno (ミグノ)
Voiced by: Yuma Uchida (Japanese); Michael Chapman (English)
A spotted hyena and friend of Legoshi's who lives in the same dorm.
Durham (ダラム, Daramu)
Voiced by: Naoto Kobayashi (Japanese); Billy Kametz (English)
A coyote and friend of Legoshi's who lives in the same dorm.
Sanou (サヌ)
Voiced by: Fukushi Ochiai (Japanese); Kyle Hebert (English)
A pelican and head director of the drama club.
Kai (カイ)
Voiced by: Nobuhiko Okamoto (Japanese); Daman Mills (English)
Kai is a mongoose. Formerly part of the drama club acting team, he is demoted by Louis to working as a stagehand and supporting the actors of the club.
Els (エルス, Erusu)
Voiced by: Sayumi Watabe (Japanese); Erika Harlacher (English)
Els is an Angora goat who was the object of Tem's affection. She initially feared Legoshi following Tem's murder, but she changed her mind and forgave the wolf when he gave her Tem's love letter.
Dom (ドーム, Dōmu)
Voiced by: Genki Muro (Japanese); Brian Beacock (English)
A third-year peafowl and the stage crew leader of the drama club.
Kibi (キビ)
Voiced by: Yūichi Iguchi (Japanese); Bryce Papenbrook (English)
An anteater and a member of the drama club's stage crew.
Sheila (シイラ, Shīra)
Voiced by: Yuko Hara (Japanese); Cristina Vee (English)
A third-year leopard and a high ranked member of the drama club serving as the choreographer.
Aoba (アオバ)
Voiced by: Ikuto Kanemasa (Japanese); Tony Azzolino (English)
A bald eagle second-year student and friend to both Legoshi and Bill.
Ellen (エレン, Eren)
Voiced by: Akane Ōchi (Japanese); Lauren Landa (English)
Ellen is a second-year plains zebra student at Cherryton Academy. She is a member of the drama club who holds great respect from the herbivore side (though not nearly as much as Louis). She is shown to be easily scared of carnivores and is the first to blame one of them for Tem's death.
Mizuchi (ミズチ)
Voiced by: Hibiku Yamamura (Japanese); Cherami Leigh (English)
A paranoid Harlequin rabbit student at Cherryton Academy in Haru's grade. She believes herself an endangered species and enjoys belittling Haru as inferior to her.
Legom (レゴム, Regomu)
Voiced by: Sakura Andou (Japanese); Reba Buhr (English)
A Leghorn chicken student at Cherryton High School who sits next to Legoshi because the seats are arranged alphabetically. Every Wednesday, she sells her eggs to the school store, where Legoshi buys eggs from to make egg sandwiches. Although they seldom interact with one another, Legom appreciates Legoshi's affinity for her eggs.
Tem (テム, Temu)
Voiced by: Takeo Ōtsuka (Japanese); Kyle McCarley (English)
Tem is an alpaca and member of the drama club who was mysteriously murdered and devoured. Before his death, he had feelings for Els and made a love letter (which Legoshi knew about and gave to Els afterward). Later in the series, the murderer is revealed amidst plenty of intrigue.
Zoe (ゾーイ, Zōi)
Voiced by: Genki Muro (Japanese); Kylen Deporter (English)
Zoe is a goat and member of Cherryton Academy's drama club.
Tao (タオ)
Voiced by: Naoto Kobayashi (Japanese); Bryce Papenbrook (season 1), Sean Chiplock (seasons 2–3) (English)
Tao is a black panther second-year student at Cherryton Academy as well as a member of the drama club.
Pina (ピナ)
Voiced by: Yūki Kaji (Japanese); Kayleigh McKee (English)
Pina is a Dall sheep first-year student and a new member of the drama club.

=== Cherryton Academy faculty ===
Gon (ゴン)
Voiced by: Kenta Sasa (Japanese); Brian Beacock (English)
The Siberian tiger who is the headmaster of Cherryton Academy and a member of the All-Organism Council, which helps in selecting new Beastars each year.
Housemother (寮母, Ryōba)
Voiced by: Mayumi Asano (Japanese); Erin Fitzgerald (English)
An unnamed female mandrill who is in charge of the carnivore male dormitory at Cherryton Academy.
Rokume (ロクメ)
Voiced by: Kujira (Japanese); Anne Yatco (English)
A rattlesnake who is the security guard of Cherryton Academy and has become fascinated by Legoshi. Her name – "Six Eyes" – refers to the eye-like markings on her body.

== Civilians ==
Mayor (市長, Shichō)
Voiced by: Mitsuaki Hoshino (Japanese); Billy Kametz (seasons 1–2), Alejandro Saab (season 3) (English)
The unnamed lion mayor who selfishly ignores any negative behavior of other carnivores (especially lions) for the sake of preserving the peace. He admits to spending an exorbitant amount of money on plastic surgery, like replacing his fangs with dull dentures, enlarging his eyes, and having his shoulder width reduced, for the sole purpose of appearing less threatening, and therefore more "electable". The mayor only kept his large hands and claws unchanged because they are liked by his wife.
Ogma (オグマ, Oguma)
Voiced by: Kenyu Horiuchi (Japanese); Bob Buchholz (English)
A red deer who is the owner and head of The Horns Conglomerate. Being infertile and in need of a successor, he adopted Louis from the Back Market Alley when the latter was very little.
Gosha (ゴーシャ, Gōsha)
Voiced by: Shigeru Chiba (Japanese); Jason Marnocha (English)
A 54-year-old male Komodo dragon who is Legoshi's maternal grandfather and only living relative. In Gosha's teen years, he was best friends and police partners with Yahya, and they were both candidates to become the new Sublime Beastar. Gosha fell in love with Toki, a gray wolf, and her unplanned hybrid pregnancy prompted Gosha to give up that dream and focus on family life. Venomous species were not allowed to marry non-venomous species, but Gosha and Toki nevertheless raised Leano as their daughter until Toki's tragic death. Gosha later raised his grandson, Legoshi, mostly by himself after Leano had become increasingly withdrawn and later killed herself. Gosha pays for Legoshi's tuition to attend Cherryton Academy until Legoshi drops out, and tracks down and reunites with his grandson because of this. Legoshi's brushes with the criminal justice system also brings Yahya back into Gosha's life. Gosha is a kind and loving grandfather, but also a formidable brawler determined to protect his family.
Yahya (ヤフヤ, Yafuya)
Voiced by: Shin-ichiro Miki (Japanese); Matthew Waterson (English)
A 51-year-old male horse and the reigning Sublime Beastar. As a teenager he was Gosha's best friend and police partner, and they had planned to become Beastars together, and Yahya subsequently came to resent Gosha for abandoning his role in that dream to start a family after Gosha's wolf girlfriend Toki became pregnant. Since then, Yahya takes a dim view of interspecies relationships and hybrids including Gosha's family, and comes to single out Legoshi as the living symbol of Gosha's unforgiven betrayal. Whereas most Beastars became involved in the media or politics to help unite society, Yahya proves to be a more reclusive Beastar, acting mainly as an independent vigilante with police contacts and generous public funding. In this, Yahya does frequently legitimately fight for social justice by stopping criminals and opposing workplace exploitation. But he has also committed some horrifying acts, such as killing criminals and disposing of their corpses as fertilizer for his prized carrot garden.
Seven (セブン, Sebun)
Voiced by: Fumiko Orikasa (Japanese); Libe Barer (English)
A 29-year-old female Merino sheep who works at a sportswear company where the executives and most of the employees are carnivores. She chooses to move out of a posh condo and into a tiny unit at the Beast Apartments, and soon befriends the recent high school dropout Legoshi as her new neighbor.
Sagwan (サグワーン, Saguwān)
Voiced by: Tesshō Genda (Japanese); SungWon Cho (English)
A male spotted seal who has spent most of his life living in the ocean, but has become an expatriate living on land at the Beast Apartments where he hopes to translate land-dweller literature into the language of ocean-dwellers. Sagwan has customs considered shocking to land-dwellers, such as being naked whenever he's not in public (as is commonplace for inhabitants of the ocean even in public), but he is a very kind and friendly individual who quickly befriends both Seven and Legoshi as his new neighbors.

== Antagonists ==
Riz (リズ, Rizu)
Voiced by: Hiroshi Shirokuma (Japanese); Patrick Seitz (English)
A brown bear student and the series' third arc's antagonist. Being over 2-meter (6.6 ft), he is required to take government-sanctioned medications to limit his strength and thus (theoretically) reduce the danger he poses to society. However, the drug's side effects cause him to suffer from headaches and uncontrollable bouts of aggression, and it was during one of these seizures that he devoured his fellow drama club member and friend, Tem. Unable to cope with his guilt, he keeps deluding himself that Tem willingly agreed to be eaten, and he becomes viciously aggressive towards anyone—especially Legoshi—who challenges him. After his final confrontation with Legoshi, Riz surrenders to the authorities and goes to juvenile prison for his crimes, largely disappearing from the story until near the end of the series, when Pina is shown to have since become close to Riz and has been regularly visiting him.

=== Shishigumi ===
The Shishigumi are a back-alley gang of lions that are one of the four major criminal organizations that control the Black Market. Among its members are:

Chief Lion (ボス, Bosu)
Voiced by: Takaya Hashi (Japanese); Kyle Hebert (English)
A lion who was the first leader of the Shihigumi and the main antagonist of the Meteor Festival arc. He kidnapped and tried to eat Haru before being defeated by Legoshi and killed by Louis.
Ibuki (イブキ)
Voiced by: Taiten Kusunoki (Japanese); Daman Mills (season 1), (Note: Mills voiced the character in season 1, specifically in episode 9.) James C. Mathis III (season 2) (English)
Member of the Shishigumi that operates in the black market. Ibuki is a clever and calm Maasai lion among its reckless members. He has a strong father/son-like relationship with Louis.
Free (フリー, Furī)
Voiced by: Subaru Kimura (Japanese); Kellen Goff (English)
Member of the Shishigumi who is a quick-tempered Indian lion that actively takes on the lead in turf wars. Aggressive, but also likes to joke around.
Melon (メロン, Meron)
Voiced by: Kōji Okino (Japanese); Darren Criss (first voice), Scott Whyte (second voice) (English)
A 24-year-old male gazelle/leopard hybrid who becomes the new leader of the Shishigumi crime syndicate and the primary antagonist of the final arc. He is a sociopathic serial killer who has killed dozens of animals since his young childhood, including his own mother. The top half of his face is like that of a gazelle with horns, but the bottom half is like that of a leopard with spots, and he usually wears a cloth face mask in public to pass as an ordinary herbivore so he can gain the confidence of his victims. Melon enjoys hurting people, and also experiences pain as pleasure and occasionally self-harms for this reason.

=== Dokugumi ===
The Dokugumi are a gang of Komodo dragons that are one of the four major criminal organizations that control the Black Market. Each of its members wear gas masks or anything that can cover their mouths.

Savon (サボン, Sabon)
A Komodo dragon that is the leader of the Dokugumi.

=== Inarigumi ===
The Inarigumi are a gang of female foxes that are one of the four major criminal organizations that control the Black Market.

Ten (テン)
A female red fox in an eyepatch who is the leader of the Inarigumi.

=== Madaragumi ===
The Madaragumi are a gang of leopards and jaguars that are one of the four major criminal organizations that control the Black Market.

Miso (味噌)
A leopard who is the leader of the Madaragumi.
