= Old Bear and Friends =

Children's book series by Jane Hissey

The front cover of the first Old Bear book

Old Bear and Friends is a popular series of children's books written by British author and illustrator Jane Hissey. The books became the basis for a BAFTA award-winning television series Old Bear Stories.

== Plot ==
The animals in the playroom have remembered that Old Bear disappeared long ago. He was put into the attic to protect him from the children's rough play, and with the children being older now, the animals rescue him and bring him back down to the playroom. He becomes the most respected toy and guides the others in their many adventures. Splash, published in 2003, was the first book where the toys leave the house and garden.

== Characters ==
- Old Bear — an old dusty teddy bear, Old Bear is the sensible one who likes to sort out problems and keep everyone happy. He likes to look after all the other toys and loves reading them a bedtime story at the end of the day. Old Bear is based on a real teddy bear the author, Jane, received from her grandmother when she was a baby.
- Bramwell Brown — a wise brown teddy bear, often considered second to Old Bear and the leader of the animals in Old Bear's absence. He is practical and is always making and mending things, cooking, knitting and sewing. He often has useful ideas and helpful suggestions.
- Duck — a grumpy toy duck. He often expects things to go wrong rather than right and delights in warning the other toys. Not being very energetic, Duck plods along with the others, joining in but never wanting to be the first to do things. He can flap his wings to jump but has never quite mastered the art of flying.
- Rabbit — an impulsive toy rabbit. He is bouncy, energetic, impetuous and fun. There is nothing Rabbit likes more than jumping but when jumping is not high enough he can fly the little wooden plane (usually on rescue missions). Rabbit is fearless and often rushes into things without thinking although this sometimes gets him into tricky situations. However he usually manages to get out of them again with a bit of help from his friends.
- Little Bear — a small white toy bear who wears overly baggy red trousers. Little Bear is happy, brave and energetic and often gets into trouble without meaning to. Apart from the blue-striped pyjamas that he wears for bed, he is almost always seen in his baggy, red trousers. Small enough to ride on the back of the larger toys like Hoot and Camel, he loves to lead the way into adventures but also needs Old Bear, Bramwell Brown or Hoot around, just in case! Little Bear quite likes being small but he does not like to be thought of as a baby, even when it is part of a game. He rushes about so much that he is often hungry, so any suggestion of a picnic or party, or even just a bowl of porridge, will get his attention.
- Dog — a black toy dog.
- Cat — a black toy cat.
- Camel — a helpful and kind camel. A follower rather than a leader, she is one of the biggest of the toys and can carry more than one of the smaller toys on her back.
- Zebra — a stuffed zebra. She is always helpful, despite the fact that she is not good at running or jumping. She is usually where the action is; taking part in her own quiet way. Zebra has her own little red, wooden cart that can be used to carry things like wooden bricks for building things or for giving rides to the smaller toys.
- Sailor — a sailor doll. Being the same size as Little Bear, Sailor has joined in his adventures. He loves anything to do with boats or the sea and knows a lot about both.
- Jolly Tall — a toy giraffe, Jolly Tall is a cheerful character who is always smiling. He will rush to help anyone and his long neck is particularly useful for rescuing small friends from high places.
- Hoot — a female white toy owl who lives in the loft. She is the only one of the toys who can fly. She is sensible, kind and motherly and likes to look after the "younger" characters. Hoot sleeps all day in her nest on top of the wardrobe (unless someone needs to be rescued when she leaps into action). At night, however, when everyone else is asleep, Hoot is awake and busy. No one is really sure what she does, but if anything is missing in the morning it may be because Hoot has tidied it away in the night!
- Ruff — a bouncy toy dog. He is fun to play with but sometimes can muddle up games by being a little too bouncy. He does have to be careful not to leave muddy footprints everywhere.
- Ruby — a little toy mouse with a knitted red jumper. She is adventurous and playful with many ideas for new games.
- Blue Rabbit — a lively blue toy rabbit. He loves parties and adventures with Ruby. His bright yellow shirt and blue spotty trousers make him a colourful addition to any page.
- Blanket — a white toy horse with black spots. Blanket likes to make sure everyone is safe and happy. He has some very useful advice for the other toys but he joins in all the fun too.
- The Naughty Cats — the main antagonists. Five toy cats who cause a lot of trouble for Ruby, Blue and Blanket but Blanket knows how to get them to behave themselves.
- Splash — a friendly toy seal with a sea-shell necklace, who meets the toys while they are on holiday at the beach. She is kind and fun and rescues Little Bear when he floats out to sea in a bucket.
- Elsie — a little toy elephant, she is the newest character to join the toys. She is very good at doing almost everything but sometimes she is a little too enthusiastic when tying bows or blowing up balloons, and does not know when to stop. The other toys have a job keeping up with her. Elsie's trunk means that she can do things that the others cannot, such as using a knife, fork and spoon all at once and blowing the most amazing bubbles! As Elsie is the same size as Little Bear she can join in all his games but he doesn't always need her help.

== The books ==
- Old Bear (1986)
- Little Bear's Trousers (1987)
- Teddy Bear Tales (1988)
- Little Bear Lost (1989)
- Old Bear Birthday Book (1990)
- Jolly Tall (1990)
- Jane Hissey's Old Bear Journal (1991)
- Old Bear and His Friends (1991)
- Jolly Snow (1991)
- Little Bear's Bedtime (1992)
- Little Bear's Day (1992)
- Old Bear – My First Year (Jane Hissey Collection) (1992)
- Old Bear Address Book (1992)
- Old Bear Height Chart (1993)
- Old Bear Bookplates (1993)
- Ruff (1994)
- Old Bear Stories (1994) (contains Old Bear, Jolly Tall, Jolly Snow and Ruff)
- Old Bear Autograph Book (1994)
- Old Bear – A Pop-up Book (1995)
- Hoot (1996)
- Old Bear Photograph Album (1997)
- The Old Bear Board Book (1998) (a new version of 'Old Bear')
- Jolly Tall Board Book (1998)
- Jolly Snow Board Book (1998)
- Little Bear's Dragon and Other Stories (1999)
- Little Bear's Alphabet (2000)
- Little Bear's Numbers (2001)
- What's the Time, Little Bear? (2001)
- Old Bear's All-Together Painting (2001) (alternative title: Old Bear's Surprise Painting)
- Splash (2003)
- Happy Birthday Old Bear (2016)
- Little Bear and the Silver Star (2020)
