= Clifford Chase =

American novelist

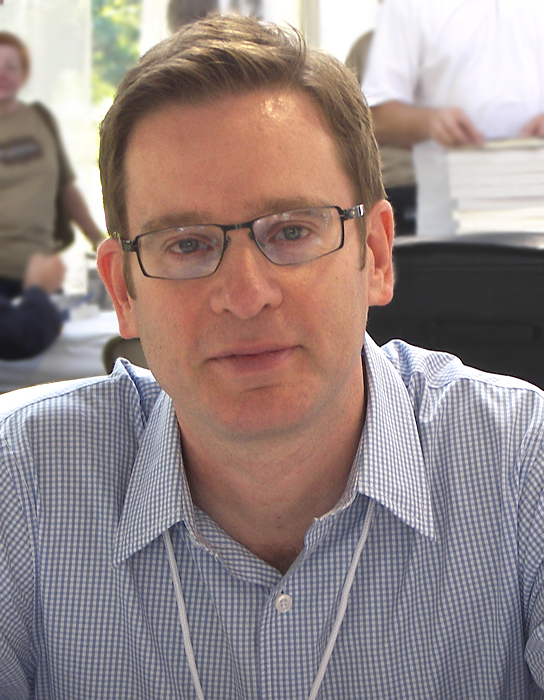
- Chase in 2007
- Born: 1958 (age 67–68); Connecticut, U.S.
- Education: University of California, Santa Cruz; City College of New York
- Occupation: Author

Clifford Chase (born 1958) is an American author who has written the memoir The Tooth Fairy and Winkie, a novel about a sentient teddy bear accused of terrorism. He has also written additional memoirs and edited Queer 13: Lesbian and Gay Writers Recall Seventh Grade, a shortlisted nominee in the Children's/Young Adult and Nonfiction Anthologies categories at the 1999 Lambda Literary Awards.

== Life ==
Chase was born in 1958 in Connecticut as the youngest of five brothers and sisters. All of his other siblings were much older than him except for his brother Ken, who was only six years older. Chase had a close relationship with Ken, who like him was also gay, and Chase was deeply affected when his brother died of AIDS at the age of 37.

Chase's family moved when he was young to San Jose, California, where he grew up. He earned his undergraduate degree from the University of California, Santa Cruz in 1980 and received a graduate degree in creative writing from the City College of New York in 1987. In the 1980s he worked in public relations at Newsweek.

Chase currently lives in Brooklyn. He's worked as a visiting writer at Bowling Green State University, where he instructed courses in creative writing for the English Department, and as a visiting writer and professor of English at Wesleyan University.

== Writing career ==
Chase's memoir On the Shoulder of the Road, about his brother Ken and the rest of his family, was published in 1994. The following year he released The Hurry-Up Song: A Memoir of Losing My Brother, which The Harvard Gay & Lesbian Review called "an honest assessment of the gruesome realities of coming to terms with the premature death of a brother."

Chase's first novel, Winkie, was released in 2006 and is a satirical tale of a sentient teddy bear accused of terrorism. The novel was named a must-read selection by Entertainment Weekly, a notable book by The New York Times, and was a finalist for a Borders Original Voices Award. The novel has since been translated into nearly a dozen languages and in 2011 was adapted into a play at 59E59 Theaters by the Godlight Theater Company.

In 2014, Chase released his book The Tooth Fairy: Parents, Lovers, and Other Wayward Deities, which Publishers Weekly called "a memoir for the Twitter age."

== Critical reception ==
In a starred review, Publishers Weekly said Chase's satirical novel Winkie "is way too odd to be sentimental, and its political sensibility shuttles easily between the cartoonish and the shrewd. Chase puts himself in the same league as David Sedaris with this unclassifiable debut. Literary agent Donald Maass has held Winkie up as a prime example of political satire for new writers, stating that "the humor isn't in the teddy bear itself. Hilarity springs from the bear's too-real situation."
