= Mabel F. Taylor =

English cartoonist (1866–1947)

Mabel Francis Taylor (1866 in Kingswood – 1947 in Surrey; also M. F. Taylor) was an English cartoonist most well known for illustrating the comic strip "Jungle Jinks," which was the longest-running British comic series until 1954.

== Biography ==
Taylor was born to an Anglican clergyman and his wife in 1866 in Kingswood, Surrey.

== Illustrations ==
=== Book illustrations ===
In the 1890s, Taylor illustrated many children's books with her sister Edith M. Taylor.

=== Early comics ===
Taylor started the comic "The Little Sparrowkins," in The Playbox (1905).

=== "Jungle Jinks" ===
"Jungle Jinks" was the first comic in Britain whose main characters were animals. The comic was started by cartoonist Arthur White in 1898 in The Playbox, a supplement for children that came with the British women's journal Home Chat. However, White worked on the comic for a short time before Taylor took over and began to write and illustrate it.

The comic was about group of anthropomorphic animals who attended school: Jacko the monkey, Hippo the hippopotamus, Bertie and Billie Boar (twin pigs), the headmaster Dr. Lion, and others. The comic contains racist and stereotyped caricatures of Africans.

Between 1923 and 1925, Jungle Jinks was published as a standalone magazine for sixty-two issues. The strip was famous enough to serve as a catchphrase in popular culture during the 1920s.

The comic was also serialized in Home Chat during the 1940s.

"Dr. Lion's Boys," published in Happy Families (1938), was a spinoff of "Jungle Jinks."

== Publications ==
=== Book Illustrations ===
- Anonymous, Little Snowdrop (London: Raphael Tuck & Sons, Ltd., c. 1896) llustrated by Frances Brundage, M. Bowley, Edith & Mabel Taylor.
- Helen Marion Burnside, Antony Guest, and S. E. Bennett, Little Bright Eyes, edited by Edric Vredenburg (London: Raphael Tuck & Sons, Ltd., [1898?]). Illustrated by Frances Brundage, M. Bowley, Edith & Mabel Taylor.
- Farrow, G.E., The Jungle Baby, (London, et al.: Raphael Tuck & Sons, Ltd., [no year given]). Illustrated by Mabel F. Taylor and Edith M. Taylor.
- In the Wilds, (London, et al: Raphael Tuck & Sons, Ltd., [c. 1915]). Illustrated by G. Henry Thompson, Stavert J. Cash, Felix Leigh, Mabel F. Taylor, and William Foster.
