= Grinter Place =

Historic house in Kansas, United States

- U.S. National Register of Historic Places
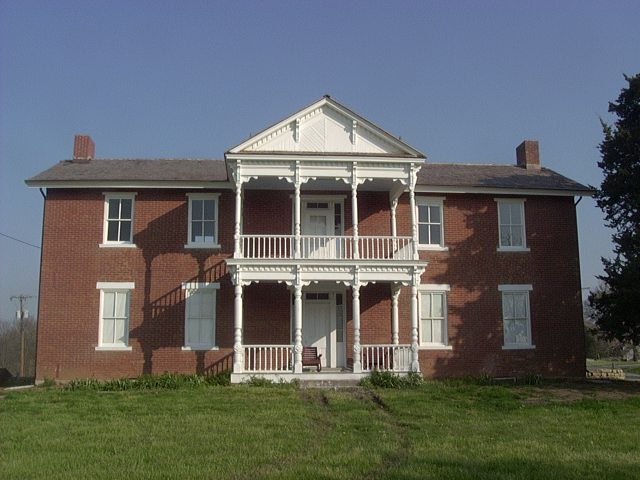

- Location within Kansas Location within the United States
- Location: 1420 South 78th Street, Muncie, Kansas
- Coordinates: 39°4′32.06″N 94°45′35.66″W
- Built: 1857
- Architectural style: Colonial
- Website: http://www.kshs.org/p/grinter-place/19564
- NRHP reference No.: 71000338
- Added to NRHP: January 25, 1971

Grinter Place is a house on the National Register of Historic Places above the Kansas River in the Muncie neighborhood of Kansas City, Kansas.

== History ==
The house was constructed by Moses Grinter where he and his half-Lenape (Delaware) wife lived until he died in 1878 and she in 1905. Grinter's wife's Indian name was "Windagamen," which meant "Sweetness." She was one of about 25 Delaware women who became U.S. citizens when the territory became a state. Near this place, the Delaware Crossing (or "Military Crossing"; sometimes "the Secondine'") allowed passage from the old Indian trail where it met the waters of the Kaw River.

Around 1831, Grinter, one of the earliest permanent white settlers in the area, set up the Grinter Ferry on the Kansas River here. His house, the Grinter Place, still stands. The ferry was used by individuals such as traders, freighters and soldiers traveling between Fort Leavenworth and Fort Scott on the military road. Others would cross this area on their way to Santa Fe. Grinter operated a trading post at the site and later in the home, the oldest remaining in Wyandotte County, between 1855 and 1860. The area was home to the first non-military post office in Kansas.

The property remained in the family until 1950, when it was sold and became a chicken dinner restaurant until the mid-1960s. The property was bought by the state of Kansas in 1971. The site is administrated by the Kansas Historical Society as Grinter Place State Historic Site. It was placed on the National Register of Historic Places on January 25, 1971.

== Other activity ==
By the 1820s, François Gesseau Chouteau's family, part of the American Fur Company, operated posts in this vicinity. Beginning in the 1830s, the Delaware tribe, the Wyandot tribe, Munsee tribe and the Shawnee tribe, all Eastern United States tribes, were relocated in this area. The Delaware agency, smithy, and Baptist and Methodist missions were located near the Grinter Place. Between 1863 and 1864, the Union Pacific Eastern Division built a railway through the area between the house and the Kaw River. In 1869, the Union Pacific constructed rails through the area and they continued on to the western border of the state. By the 1870s, the Eastern United States tribes were removed from the area and relocated further south to what is now the state of Oklahoma.

== Gallery ==
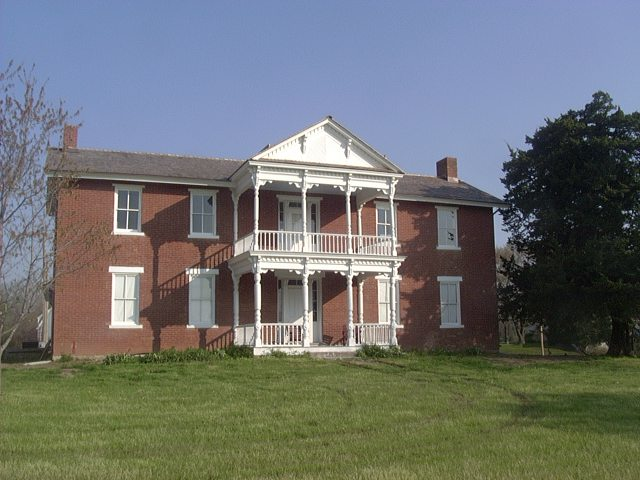
1857 Grinter House.

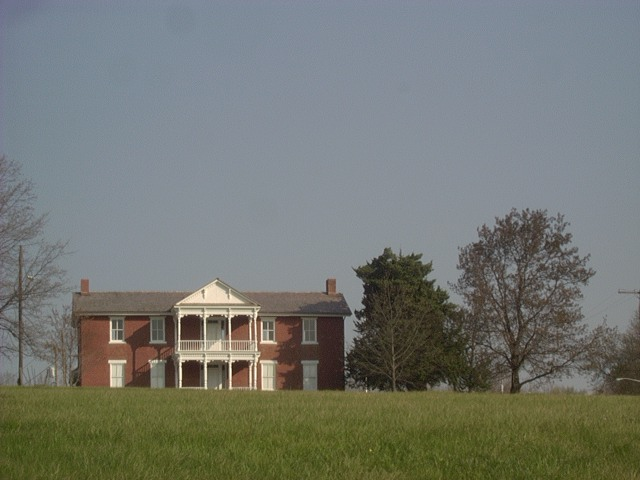
1857 Grinter House.

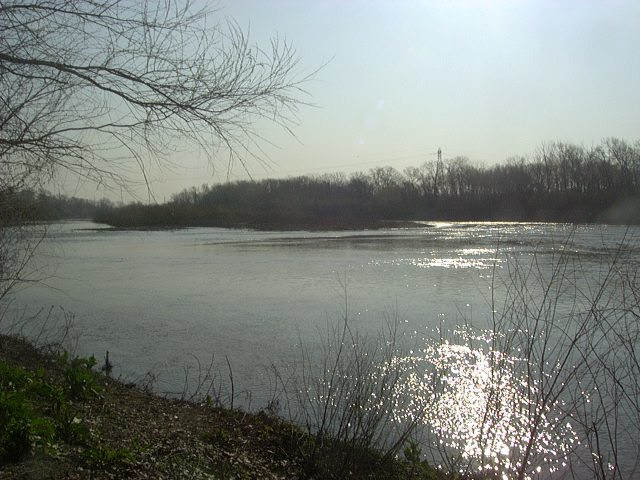
The Secondine looking eastward.

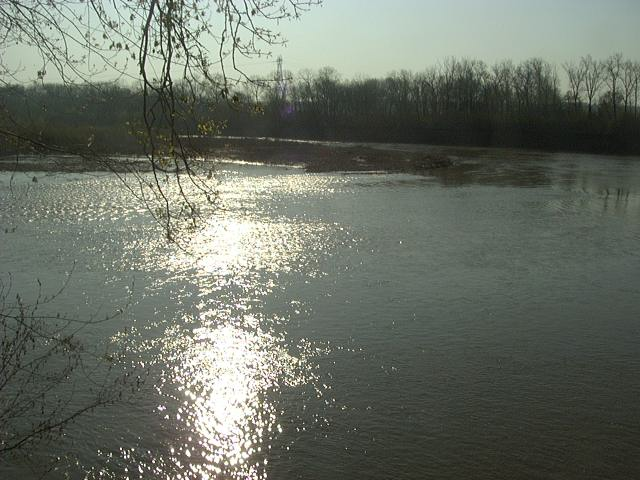
The "Military Crossing" on the Kaw River.

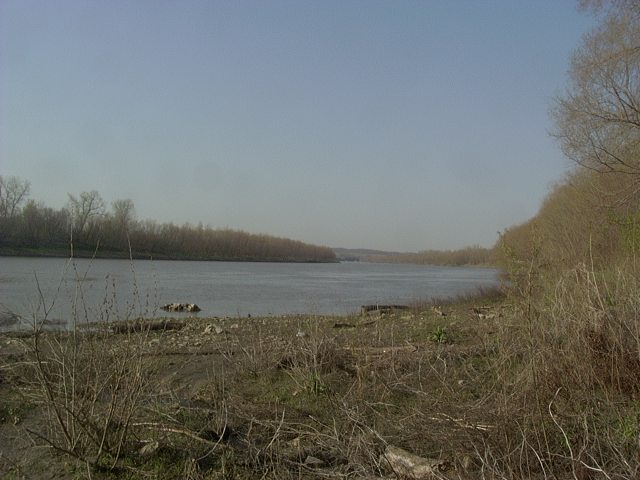
The Kaw River at the Grinter Place looking westward.

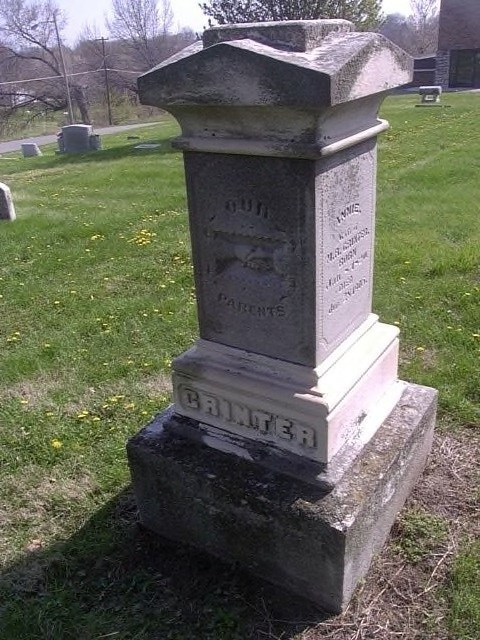
A quarter-mile behind the Grinter Place, this is Moses and Annie Grinter's tombstone.
