= 1980 Summer Olympics closing ceremony =

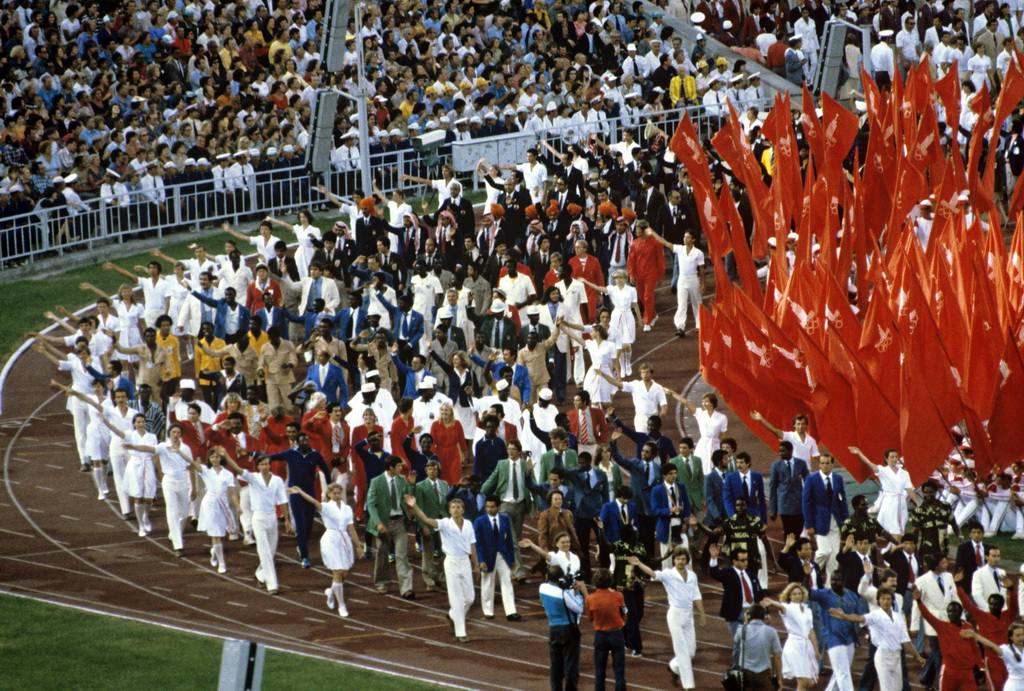
The athletes entering the stadium. RIAN photo.

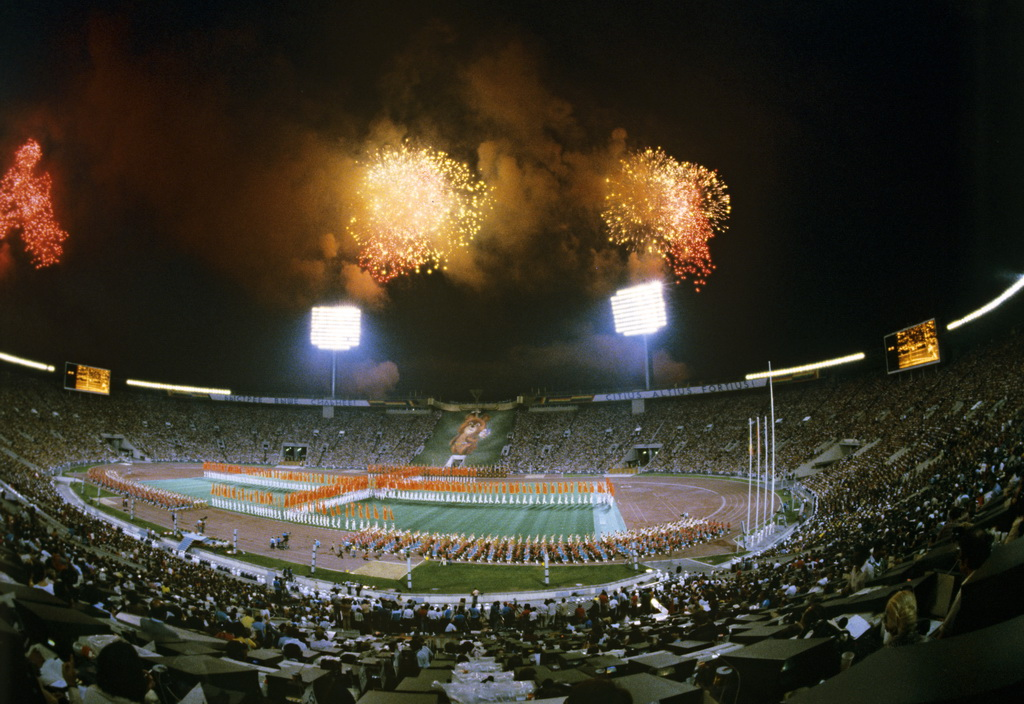
Fireworks above the stadium. RIAN photo.

The Closing Ceremony of the 1980 Summer Olympics was held at 19:00 Moscow Time (UTC+3) on 3 August 1980 at the Grand Arena of the Central Lenin Stadium. It was attended by the Chairman of the Presidium of the Supreme Soviet of the USSR, Leonid Brezhnev. IOC President Lord Killanin closed the Games for the final time and passed the position on to Juan Antonio Samaranch.

As with other Olympic closing ceremonies held before and after, it was also originally planned to include the traditional handover to the next host city for the 1984 Summer Olympics, Los Angeles. However, the United States-led boycott resulted in changes to these elements, initiated by a host nation. Among them, the flag of Los Angeles was raised instead of the flag of the next host nation, the flag of the United States; the Olympic Hymn was played in place of the United States National Anthem; and the next host city presentation, featuring artistic displays of dance and theater representative of Los Angeles and the United States, was removed from the ceremony's programme.

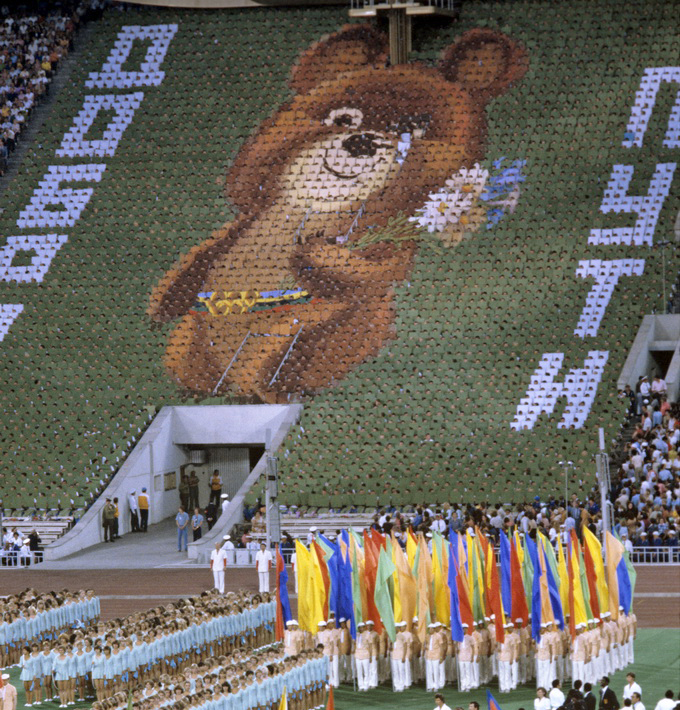
A tear in the eye of Misha the mascot during the closing ceremony. RIAN photo.

== Sequence of events ==
- The countdown of the Kremlin Clock chimes at 19:00 Moscow Time.
- The Herald Trumpeters perform "Moscow Fanfare" by Soviet musician and composer Andrei Golovin.
- Vertical red flags with the emblem of the Moscow Olympics on them enter, along with marshals and linemen. A card stunt shows the Moscow Olympics logo, with rays spreading from it.
- Flag bearers enter the stadium.
- Athletes enter the stadium.
- Athletes gather in the stadium, as gymnasts and performers carrying multicoloured vertical flags enter.
- The Soviet national flag is raised, to the Soviet national anthem.
- The Greek national flag is raised, to the Greek national anthem.
- The Los Angeles city flag is raised, to the Olympic Anthem.
- IOC President Lord Killanin gives a speech in English. He closes the Games, with the protocol phrase "the youth of the world to assemble four years from now in Los Angeles". This is his final Olympic message as IOC President, as the position is passed during the Games to Juan Antonio Samaranch.
- The Olympic flag is lowered and the Olympic Anthem is sung (in its original language (Greek), rather than Russian) by the same musical ensemble and using the same arrangement as the opening ceremony 16 days earlier.
- The Olympic Flame is extinguished, with the participation of the Vestal Virgins from Olympia with a depiction (in a card stunt) of a "fading light" sourced from the flame.
- The Olympic flag exits the stadium, to the tune of Beethoven's Ode to Joy and amidst fireworks. The flag was set to be raised again in Sarajevo, Yugoslavia, on the afternoon of 8 February 1984 for the opening ceremony of the 1984 Winter Olympics.
- The assembled athletes, flag bearers, and gymnasts exit. This is followed by a card stunt depicting Misha crying and waving goodbye to the public.

Artistic performances followed the ceremonial segment: performance by the Massed Military Bands of the Moscow Military District, Armed Forces of the USSR, conducted by the Senior Director of Music of the Armed Forces Bands Service, Major General Nikolai Mikhailov.

=== Artistic segment: Memories from Moscow ===
- Gymnasts, acrobats, and ribbon ballet dancers perform, eventually forming a picture frame for memories that will last forever (with the gymnasts as the frame itself, and the acrobats and dancers inside it).
- Giant matryoshka dolls enter, taking their places on each side of the stadium.
- The same groups who represented the Soviet Union's ethnic groups and peoples during the opening ceremony give a last dance presentation and a final goodbye.
- Misha gives a final goodbye: the crying Misha appears again in a card stunt. At the same time, a 6-metre (20 ft) inflatable version of the mascot, suspended by 22 giant helium balloons, is moved to the center of the stadium.
- Following this entrance: the finale song "Farewell, Moscow" (Russian: До свиданья, Москва, romanized: Do svidanya, Moskva) is sung by Lev Leshchenko and Tatiana Ansiferova.
- The Misha balloon is then released into the sky in the final seconds of the song as the audience applauds loudly. The balloons rise to a height of 800 metres (2,600 ft), coming down in a meadow near Moscow University after 3.5 hours.
- All the performers dance in a farewell celebration. The ending fireworks display starts around the Central Lenin Stadium, the second such display during the ceremony. Afterwards, amidst the fireworks lighting up the Moscow night sky, the performers exit with the song "Stadium of my Dreams" (Russian: Стадион моей мечты, romanized: Stadion moyey mechti) playing in the background, along with a highlight video of some special moments of the Olympics playing on the scoreboard.

== Anthems ==
- Red Army Choir – Soviet national anthem
- Red Army Choir – Greek national anthem
- Red Army Choir and the Bolshoi Theater Chorus – Olympic Hymn

== Legacy ==
Both the opening and closing ceremonies were shown in Yuri Ozerov's 1981 film O, Sport, You - the Peace! (Russian: О спорт, ты - мир!) covering the highlights of that Olympiad.

A short clip of the 1980 Summer Olympics closing ceremony of Misha's departure was shown in the closing ceremony of the 2014 Winter Olympics, after which the polar bear mascot blew out the 2014 Games Olympic torch and shed a tear (in a nod to Misha's tears during the end of the 1980 Games).
