= Sam the Eagle =

Sam the Eagle may refer to:

- Sam Eagle, a Muppet character
- Sam (mascot), mascot of the 1984 Summer Olympics
- Sam the Eagle, the audio-animatronic master of ceremonies for the Disneyland attraction America Sings
