= Feast of Disobedience =

Fairy tale by Sergey Mikhalkov

- Cover of Feast of Disobedience (1998) in Russian, by Эксмо-Пресс
- Author: Sergey Mikhalkov
- Original title: Праздник непослушания
- Illustrator: German Ogorodnikov
- Language: Russian
- Genre: Children's literature
- Publisher: Detskaya Literatura, Moscow, 1972
- Publication date: December, 1971
- Publication place: Union of Soviet Socialist Republics
- Media type: Print

Feast of Disobedience (Russian: Праздник Непослушания, romanized: Prazdnik neposlushaniya) is a "fairy tale for children and parents" by Soviet writer Sergey Mikhalkov. It tells the story of how all the parents in one town temporarily left their unruly children alone and what came of it. The story was first published in the December 1971 issue of Novy Mir magazine. Later, it was republished many times, translated into foreign languages, adapted into an animated film and a feature film, and also staged as plays based on the theatrical version of this story.

== History ==
Sergey Mikhalkov recalled that the title of the "cherished fairy tale" and "the first phrase I had so painfully sought for so many years", came to him during a vacation in Karlovy Vary. Later, after moving to the House of Bulgarian Writers in Varna, he completed the first version of the tale in two months.

In 1971, the story was published in the magazine Novy Mir (No. 12, pp. 84–101), and in 1972 in the children's magazine Pioner (Nos. 6–7). That same year, it was published as a separate edition with illustrations by German Ogorodnikov. Later editions featured drawings by Viktor Chizhikov, Georgy Yudin, and others.

== Plot ==
A little boy (referred to as "the Kid", Russian: Малыш), whose mother puts him in the corner for disobedience, meets a Kite, who offers him a flight to a place where little children aren't punished. It turns out that in one town, parents and grandparents, tired of the endless whims of their "terrible children", agree to leave them alone. That same night, all the adults leave town, and in the morning the children discover they're left to themselves.

Schoolchildren throw their satchels into the schoolyard and run to the "Sweet Tooth" (Russian: Сладкоежка) pastry shop, where they gorge on sweets and ice cream until their throats begin to hurt. They also bring buckets of paint and begin painting everything around them. One of the boys, nicknamed “Cockroach”, takes out cigarettes and cigars, and the children begin smoking, although many immediately become ill. The only adult left in town, by chance, turns out to be a midget circus performer named Fantik. Horrified by what he sees, he tries to help the children, who begin falling ill and are unable to take care of themselves.

At this time, the Kid arrives in town on a Kite and sees that life without parents isn't as good as it might seem. In despair, the children ask the Kite to fly and find their parents. He delivers a letter from the children, in which they plead with their parents to return and write:

Moms! Dads! We are the same without you as you are without us!

Under Fantik's guidance, the children restore order to the town and prepare to welcome their parents back. The three-day Feast of Disobedience ends, and with the return of the parents, the town begins to live a normal life again. The Kid finds himself back in his room, where his mother enters and tells him that she forgives him.

== Themes and influence ==
According to Sergey Mikhalkov, the story was addressed not only to children but also to adults, and his goal “was by no means only to amuse young readers, though that is also important”:

My fairy tale was meant to carry a profound pedagogical meaning, to educate through imagery and plot conflicts, but not through dreary didacticism, to affirm society’s right to reasonable order, and to oppose anarchy in any of its manifestations.

Similarly, in a conversation with Felix Medvedev, answering the question “And what do you think about the concept of the boundaries of the limits of democracy and glasnost?”, Mikhalkov said:

Any freedom does not exclude order. Complete freedom in any society turns into anarchy. I wrote a fairy tale for children about this, the Feast of Disobedience.

The fairy tale's title eventually became a catchphrase and was included in the "Dictionary of Modern Quotations". It is widely used in journalism, including in discussions of history and politics. Thus, Aleksandr Khinshtein, in his book "How Russia is Being Killed", recalls the story's plot, noting that "Russian and Soviet authorities acted according to the same principle in the early 1990s" toward the former Soviet republics ("Oh, you don't want to obey?! Go ahead! Let's see how you sing without us!").

== Translations ==
During the Soviet times, the book was translated into several European languages, including German in West Germany under the title “Hooray, the Parents Are on Strike!” (German: Hurra, die Eltern streiken!).

== Adaptations ==
- 1976: Feast of Disobedience — a Hungarian children's musical film based on the story. It was shown in the Soviet Union in 1981 with a single-voice voiceover translation by Gorky Film Studio, narrated by Aleksei Inzhevatov.
- 1977: Feast of Disobedience — a Soviet puppet-animated film with live-action elements based on the play based on the story.
- 2015: Feast of Disobedience — a Russian children's film whose plot is set in the present day and addresses a pressing contemporary issue: weaning children away from gadgets and computer games.

== See also ==
- Les Enfants de Timpelbach — a 1937 Deutschland children's book about children whose adults decide to scare them by leaving them in the town for the whole day.
- Palle alene i Verden — a 1942 Danish children's book about a boy named Palle who finds himself alone in a town.
