= Amik (disambiguation) =

Amik is the mascot of the 1976 Summer Olympics.

It is also a given name.

Amik may refer to:

== Places ==
- Lake Amik, a lake in Turkey
- Amik Valley, Hatay Province, Turkey. In Islamic eschatology, one of two possible sites, the other being Dabiq, North Syria, where the battle of Armageddon will take place.

== People with the given name ==
- Amik Kasoruho (1932-2014), Albanian author, translator, publicist
- Amik Robertson (born 1998), American football cornerback
- Amik Sherchan (born 1944), Nepali politician, deputy Prime Minister, government minister, firmer chairman of Janamorcha Nepal

== Others ==
- Lokot-lokot, or locot-locot, Philippines delicacy, also known in Davao del Sur as amik
- Pinjaram, or penyaram, a Bruneian and Malaysian kuih, also known as amik among the Iranun ethnic group in Sabah
