= Vinicius and Tom =

Official mascots of the 2016 Summer Olympics and Paralympics in Rio de Janeiro

- Vinicius (left), the mascot of the 2016 Summer Olympics, and Tom (right), the mascot of the 2016 Summer Paralympics
- First appearance: 2016
- Created by: Birdo Studio

Vinicius (Portuguese: [viˈnisjus]; Vinícius) is the official mascot of the 2016 Summer Olympics, and Tom (Portuguese: [tõw̃]) is the official mascot of the 2016 Summer Paralympics. Both events were held in Rio de Janeiro, Brazil. The mascots were created by São Paulo-based animation company Birdo, which was selected by a national tender process that began in November 2012. Vinicius' design represents Brazilian fauna, combining aspects of cats, monkeys, and birds, while Tom's design represents Brazilian flora.

Tenders to create the mascots were only accepted from Brazilian companies. The final designs were unanimously selected in August 2013 by a panel of judges comprising media professionals and representatives from various Olympic organizations. They were revealed to the public without names on 23 November 2014. Following a three-week online vote which ended on 14 December 2014, the public named the two mascots after Vinicius de Moraes and Antônio Carlos "Tom" Jobim, the co-writers of the 1962 bossa nova song "The Girl from Ipanema".

Media involving the mascots includes various merchandise and a series of two-minute animated shorts that were broadcast on Cartoon Network Brazil. Plush dolls of Vinicius were provided to coaches during the Olympic wrestling events to throw into the ring when they wished to challenge a referee's call, a practice many observers found humorous. All Paralympic medalists received a plush doll of Tom, with the leaves on Tom's head the same color as their respective medals. Multiple observers have praised the appearance of the mascots.

== History ==
=== Creation and development ===
Tenders to create the mascots of the 2016 Summer Olympic and Paralympic Games in Rio de Janeiro, Brazil, were requested in November 2012. The tender process involved design, illustration, animation, and advertising firms exclusively from Brazil, in order to ensure a "Brazilian-flavoured design". Directors from the Brazilian film festival Anima Mundi served as consultants in the process. The Rio 2016 organizers sent the agencies involved a list of 17 guidelines, among which were:

... the mascots need to reflect the local culture, but must also be universally understood; they should be aligned with the brand direction of the Rio 2016 logos and with the values of the Olympic and Paralympic movements; they must represent universal values, such as friendship, respect and fair play; they must speak to children in particular, but also resonate with adults.

The organizers selected three proposed mascot designs and subjected them to a perception survey with children aged six to twelve in Rio de Janeiro and São Paulo. The organizers presented each of the three potential mascots to the children, who were unaware that the designs were candidates for the Rio 2016 mascots and were told only about their fictional backgrounds and personality traits. The children responded with comments such as "'This is my friend', 'This one seems stuck-up', 'This one has cool hair'; and 'That one looks silly'". The organizers used the children's comments to improve the mascot designs.

In August 2013, a panel of judges was formed to select the final mascots, comprising representatives of the organizers of Rio 2016, the International Olympic Committee, the Brazilian Olympic Committee, and the Brazilian Paralympic Committee, along with professionals in the fields of animation, illustration, advertising and market research. The judges unanimously chose a set of two mascots, one for the Olympic Games and the other for the Paralympic Games, created by Birdo, a São Paulo-based animation company. After a search of existing intellectual property confirmed that the mascot designs were original, Birdo and the organizers began to create content featuring the mascots, working in secrecy.

=== Naming and unveiling ===
On 22 November 2014, in preparation for the unveiling, the Rio 2016 organizers held a press event in which costumes of the mascots of past Olympic and Paralympic Games visited Rio de Janeiro to meet the new mascots of the Rio 2016 Games. The mascots were revealed to the public on 23 November 2014, the names to be determined by an online public vote. There were three candidates in the vote:

- "Oba and Eba" – Brazilian Portuguese expressions of joy
- "Tiba Tuque and Esquindim" – "tiba" means "a lot" in Tupi–Guarani languages, "tuque" comes from batuque, and "esquindim" is a Brazilian Portuguese word for natural sway
- "Vinicius and Tom" – the names of musicians Vinicius de Moraes and Antônio Carlos "Tom" Jobim, the co-writers of the song "The Girl from Ipanema"

On 24 November 2014, the mascots appeared publicly in costumes for the first time at the Ginásio Experimental Olímpico Juan Antonio Samaranch, a school in Rio motivated by the 2016 Summer Olympics and established for talented young athletes. After a three-week voting period, the names "Vinicius and Tom" won over "Oba and Eba" and "Tiba Tuque and Esquindim" on 14 December 2014, tallying 44 percent of 323,327 votes.

=== Use of Vinicius in Olympic wrestling events ===
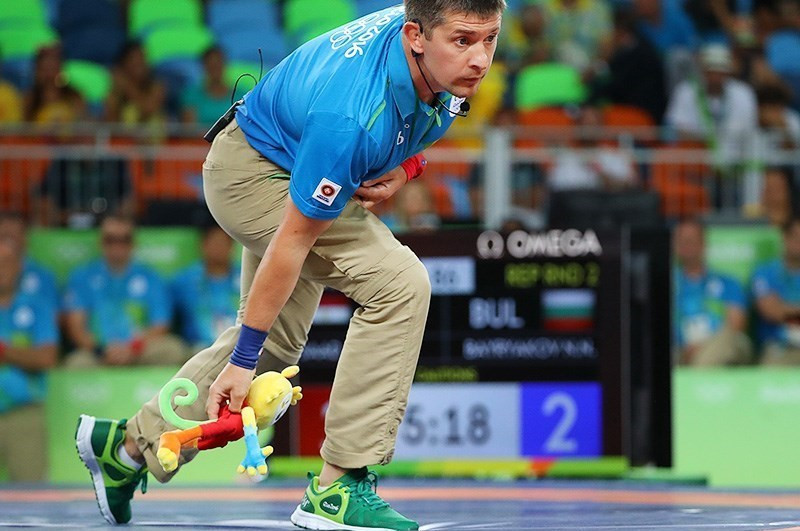
A referee in men's Greco-Roman 85 kg wrestling picks up a plush doll of Vinicius, thrown by coaches into the ring at Rio 2016 to challenge referee calls.

In wrestling, coaches may challenge a referee's call by throwing a predetermined "soft object" into the ring. Although this is normally a foam brick, wrestling rules do not specify what the soft object must be. During the 2016 Olympic wrestling events, the organizers provided coaches with soft plush dolls of Vinicius to throw into the ring when they wished to challenge a call. One wrestler's coach received a Vinicius doll with a red shirt, while the opponent's coach received one with a blue shirt.

Many observers found the practice humorous. Luke Meredith, a writer for the Associated Press, wrote that it "has already led to a few amusing moments where a coach, enraged with a call gone against his wrestler, had to reach for a tiny stuffed animal and fling it across the mat to get the referee's attention." NBC Sports commentators for their Olympic coverage began referring to Vinicius as "the challenge mascot." Dustin Nelson, a news writer for the website Thrillist, wrote that the mascot took "a little of the anger out of a challenge." Jason Bryant, the in-house commentator for wrestling at the 2016 Olympics, was slightly surprised to see the practice at the Olympics, given the emphasis there on "protocol", but he eventually commented that it does not matter what the challenge object is, particularly if it has cultural significance to the location of the competition. Coach Mike Malinconico argued that the practice does not belong at the Olympic Games, stating, "The fate of one of my athletes who has been training for this specific moment for four years hangs in the balance of a referee's error. And I have a stuffed animal in my hands."

== Characteristics ==
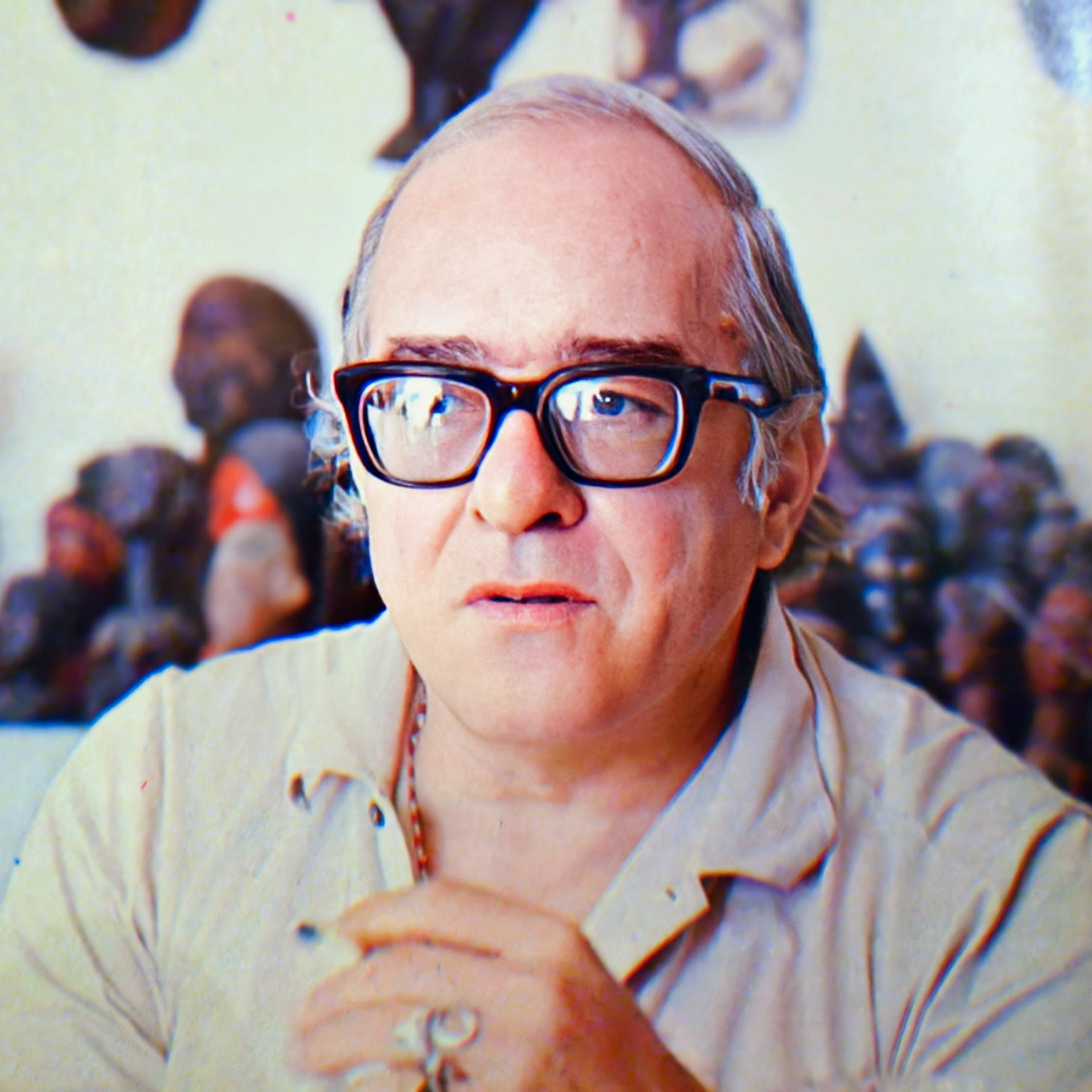
Vinicius de Moraes, the namesake of the Olympic mascot

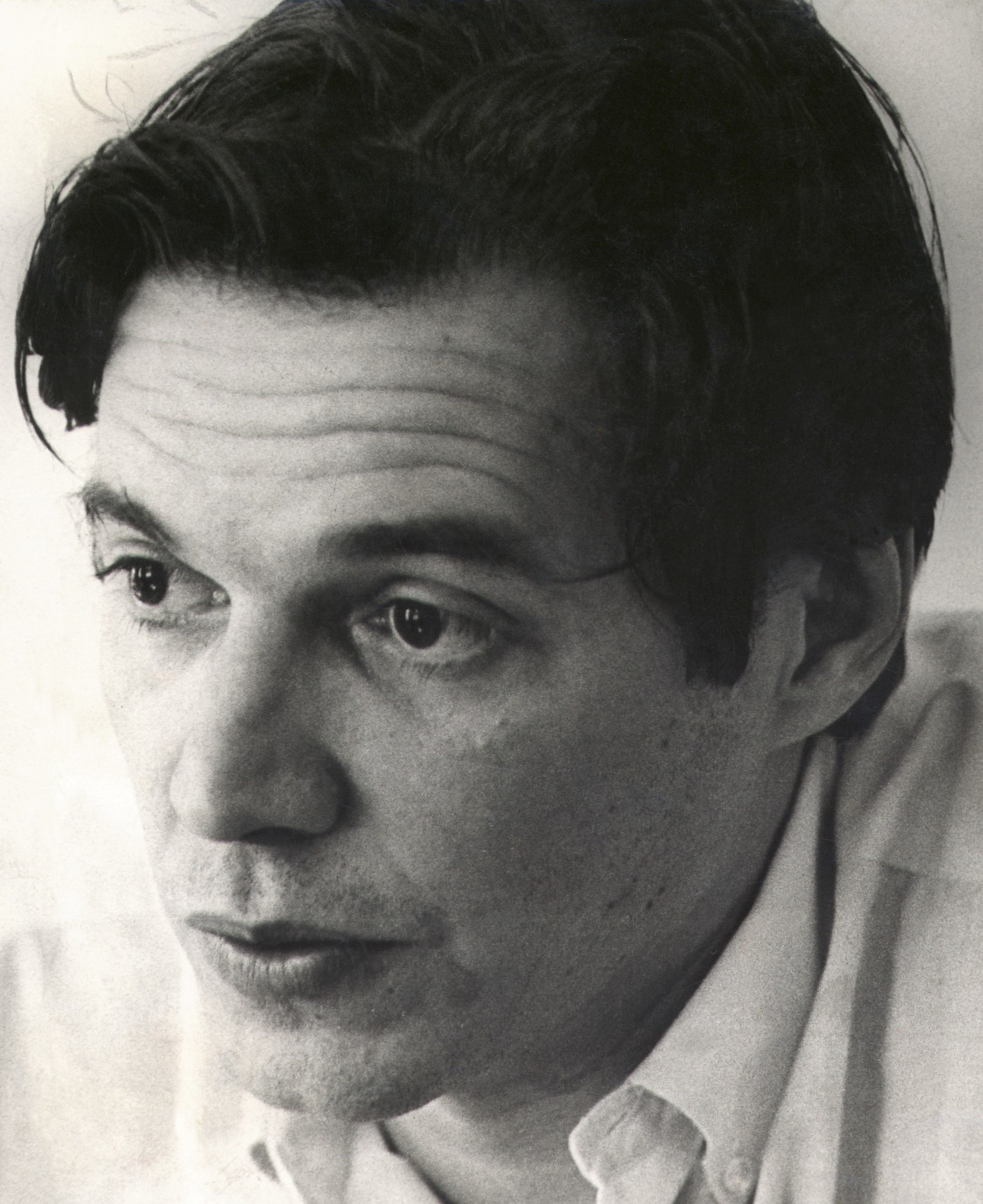
Tom Jobim, the namesake of the Paralympic mascot

Moraes and Jobim co-wrote the 1962 bossa nova song "The Girl from Ipanema".

Vinicius, named after Brazilian lyricist Vinicius de Moraes, is the Olympic mascot. Vinicius's design represents Brazilian wildlife, combining "the agility of cats, the sway of monkeys and grace of birds." The character can stretch his arms and legs "as long as he wants." Vinicius's mission is "to spread joy throughout the world and celebrate the friendship that flourishes between people from all over the world" at the Olympic Games.

Tom, named after Brazilian musician Tom Jobim, is the Paralympic mascot. Tom's design represents the plants of Brazilian forests. Any object can be pulled out of the leaves on Tom's head. He is a joyful character, who is constantly determined to change, grow, and overcome challenges serving as a representation of the transformation impact of paralympic athletes. Tom believes that every obstacle has a solution. His mission is "to inspire everybody to use creativity and determination to always reach further and have fun." Designed by Luciana Eguti and Paulo Mupped from Birdo Studio, Tom’s friendly and open personality, welcomed all athletes and fans to the Rio 2016 Paralympic Games.

According to their fictional backstories, Vinicius and Tom "were both born from the joy of Brazilians" after the International Olympic Committee selected Rio de Janeiro to host the 2016 Summer Olympics and Paralympics. Brand director Beth Lula stated that the mascots are intended to reflect the diversity of Brazil's culture and people. The mascots' namesakes, Vinicius de Moraes and Tom Jobim, co-wrote the 1962 bossa nova song "The Girl from Ipanema".

== Media ==
=== Animated shorts ===
Logo for the mascots

A series of animated adventure shorts called Vinicius e Tom – Divertidos por Natureza ("Vinicius and Tom – Fun by Nature" or "Vinicius and Tom – Natural Entertainers") began broadcasting on Cartoon Network Brazil on 5 August 2015. The shorts are also available to view on the official website as well as on YouTube, as uploaded by the Organizing Committee's YouTube channel. The series consists of 32 two-minute episodes and is the third television cartoon series based on Olympic mascots and the first such cartoon created in the Americas. The show follows Vinicius and Tom as they live in Brazilian forests and cities. In the series, the mascots are occasionally joined by the "Carioca Sisters" (Portuguese: Irmãs Cariocas): Bela, Sol, and Vida.

The series is designed to promote the mascots. Turner Broadcasting System, the owner of Cartoon Network, invested US$750,000 in the series. Cartoon Network helped to coproduce the series, having won an open competition held by the Rio 2016 organizers to select a collaborator for the series. Brand director Beth Lula stated that the mascots "are one of the principal methods of engaging the public with the Games. The cartoon will give them life, reinforcing the emotional link of the public with the event." Although the series is targeted towards children, Sylmara Multini, Director of Licensing and Retail for the Rio 2016 Organizing Committee, stated that it will attract adults too.

=== Merchandise ===
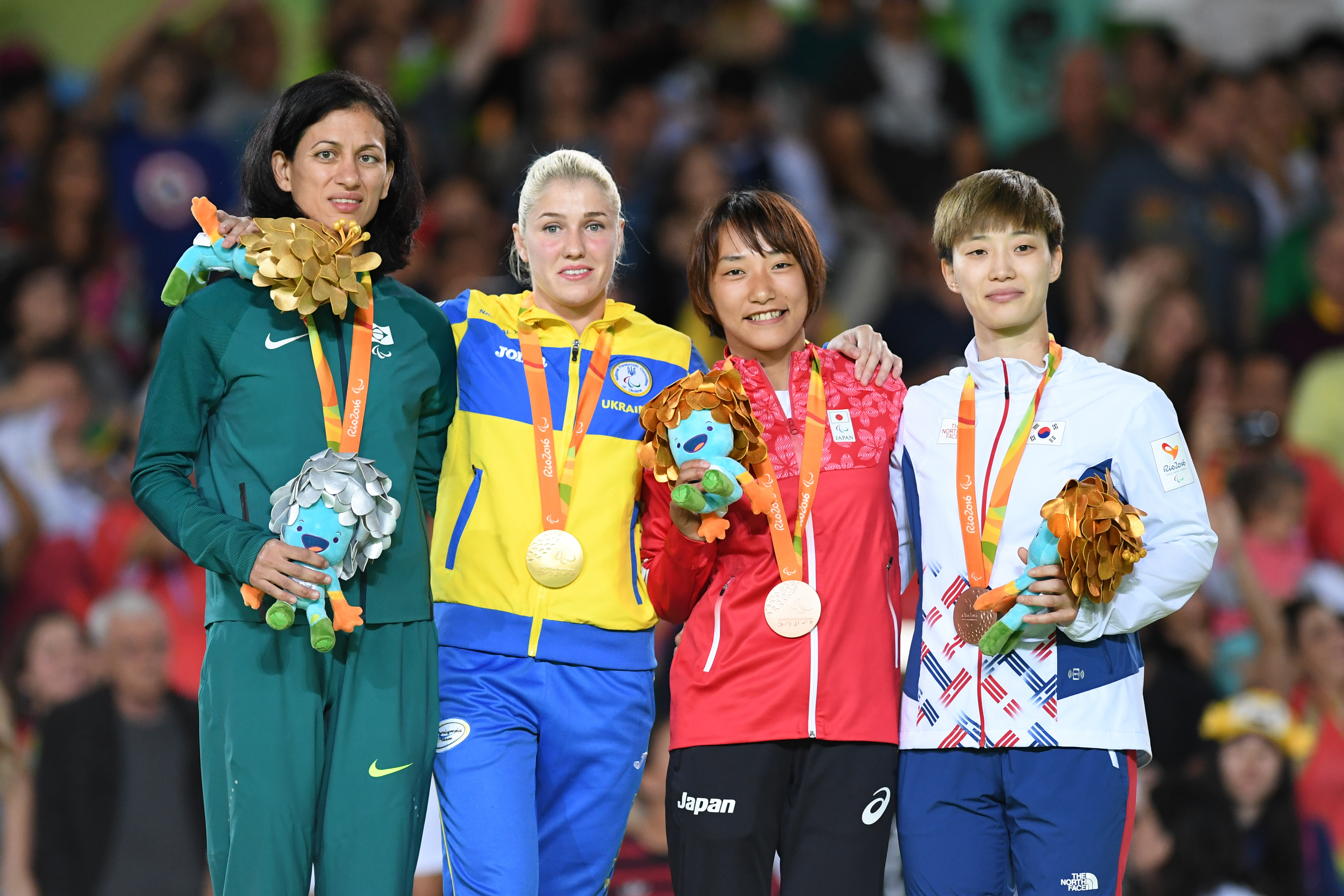
Paralympic medalists in women's 57 kg judo hold plush dolls of Tom, with the leaves on Tom's head colored to correspond with their medals.

The mascots were included among the merchandise of the Rio 2016 Games, ranging from a Lego kit to life-size dolls. During the Paralympic events, medalists received stuffed toys of Tom, with the leaves on the dolls' heads colored in gold, silver, or bronze to correspond with their medals. The Lego kit featuring Vinicius and Tom is the first time Lego made a commercial version of the official mascots of the Games. An employee at a Rio 2016 merchandise store commented that the mascots were "the most popular thing by far. ... Kids and adults all love them, especially Vinicius, he is the favourite."

The Rio 2016 Organizing Committee originally estimated that the mascots could make up 25 percent of licensed merchandise sales in Rio. Overall, merchandise sales were 11 percent higher than the original targets, according to Rio 2016 spokesperson Mario Andrada. Two products, a hat in the shape of Vinicius's head and a pair of Havaianas bearing Vinicius, were, respectively, the best-selling and second-best-selling merchandise items during the 2016 Summer Olympics.

== Reception ==
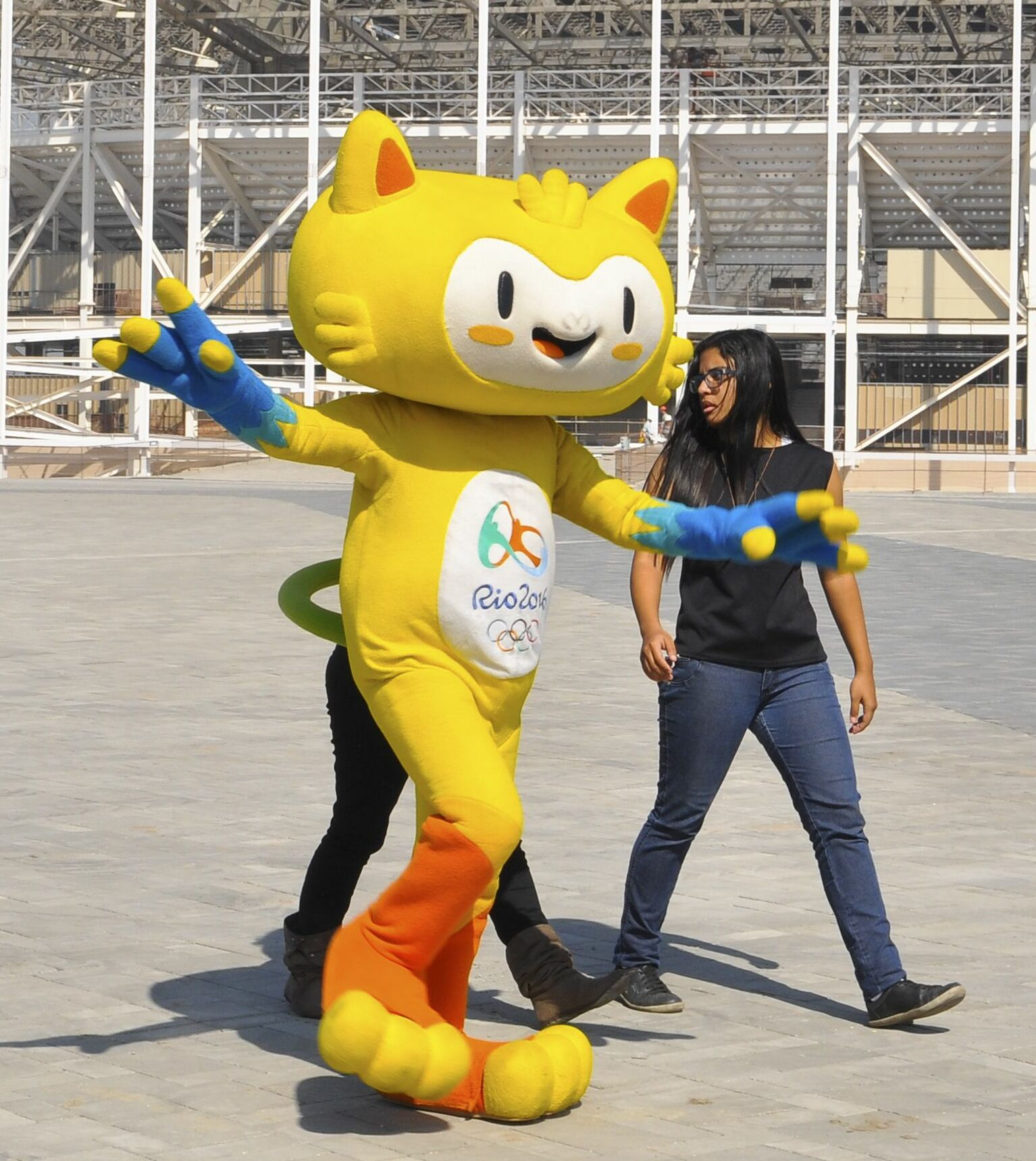
Vinicius at the Barra Olympic Park in Barra da Tijuca, photographed in August 2015

Julia Glum, in an article in the International Business Times, wrote that the "mascot for the Olympic Games is almost always strange-looking, and Rio de Janeiro is no exception. ... though they're by far not the craziest Olympic animals to ever exist ..." In an article published by Mic, Brianna Provenzano referred to the mascots as "lovable", describing their appearance as "sweet and simple" and highlighting their symbolisms for the animals and plants of Brazil. However, Charlotte Wilder, a writer on USA Today's sports column For The Win, was unimpressed by Vinicius's design, stating, "Whoever was in charge of coming up with this creature of the huge hands and feet did exactly what it looks like, which is mash up a bunch of animals, video game characters, and cartoons, stuff it with some synthetic filling, and call it day." Robert John Young, Professor of Wildlife Conservation at the University of Salford, criticized Rio 2016 for failing to capitalize on environmental protection by "inventing" mascots, rather than using actual animal species. Young also criticized the organizers for not offering a female name in the public vote.

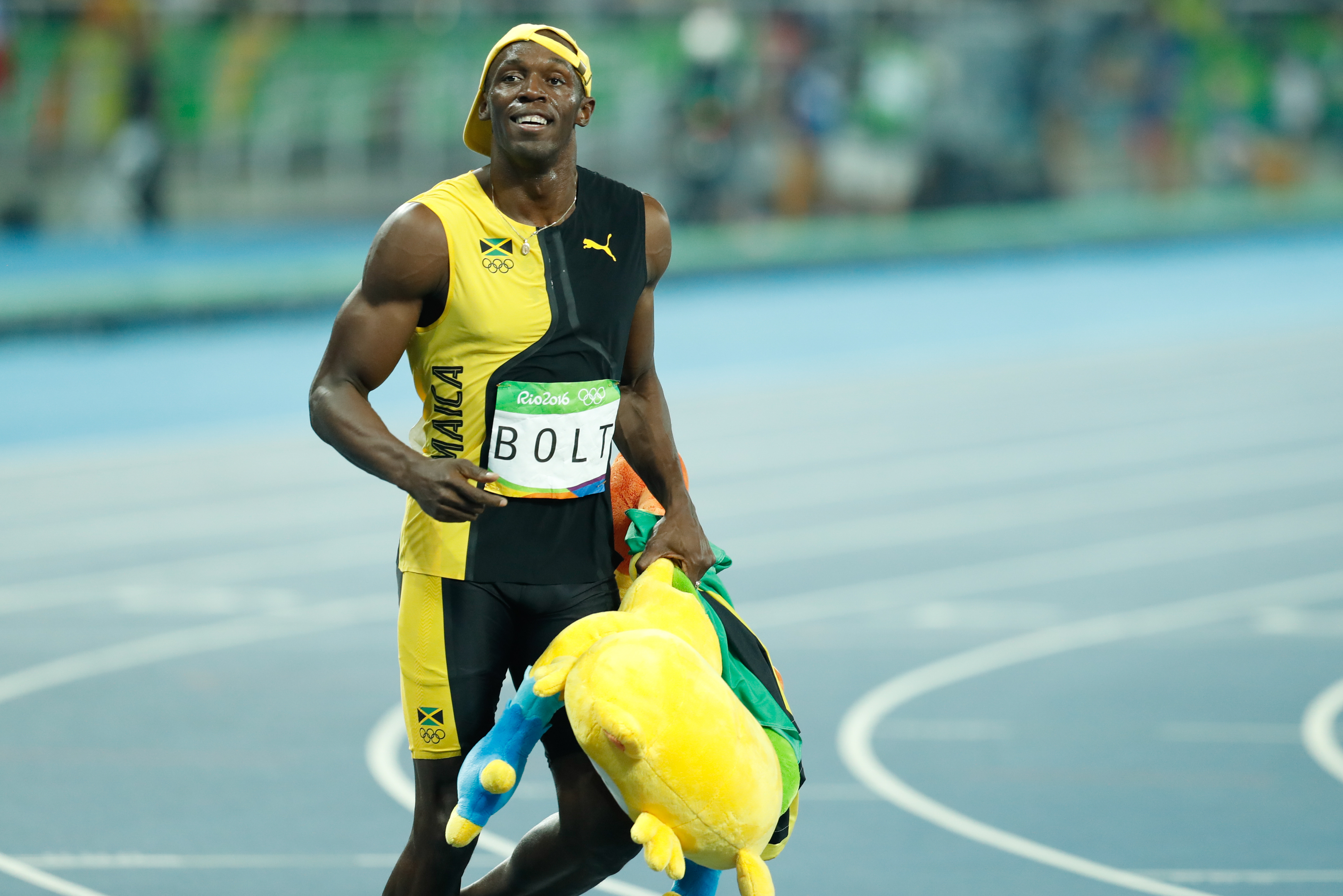
Usain Bolt carries a plush doll of Vinicius after winning the men's 100 metre event.

On the other hand, Carlos Merigo wrote on Brazilian website B9 that the mascots bring back "the colorful, loving and fun atmosphere that marked the Olympic mascots over the decades", calling them a "return to origins" following the "shapelessness" of Wenlock and Mandeville, the mascots of the 2012 Summer Olympics in London. Neha Prakash, writing on digital media website Mashable, wrote that, compared to the "terror" of the mascots of the 2014 Winter Olympics, Vinicius and Tom "are more nostalgia-inducing than nightmarish". Multiple observers compared the art style of the mascots to that of the Pokémon franchise, while Stephen Wood, in an article on the history of Olympic mascots published by Paste, likened them to the style of Adventure Time, an American animated television series. In an entry about 2000 Summer Olympics' unofficial mascot Fatso the Wombat on Slate's culture blog Brow Beat, Matthew Dessem wrote that there were no glaring issues with the mascots when compared to previous Olympic mascots: "Like the best Olympic mascots of yore, Vinicius and Tom are well-suited to plush toys and licensing deals and will be completely forgotten within a year." Leila Cobo, in an article published by Billboard, praised the organizers of Rio 2016 for "celebrating music in a most joyful and profound way" by naming the Olympic mascot after Vinicius de Moraes.

Preceded by Leopard, Zaika and Bely Mishka	Olympic mascot Vinicius; Rio 2016	Succeeded by Soohorang
Preceded by Luchik and Snezhinka	Paralympic mascot Tom; Rio 2016	Succeeded by Bandabi
