= 2014 Winter Olympics closing ceremony =

- Part of 2014 Winter Olympics
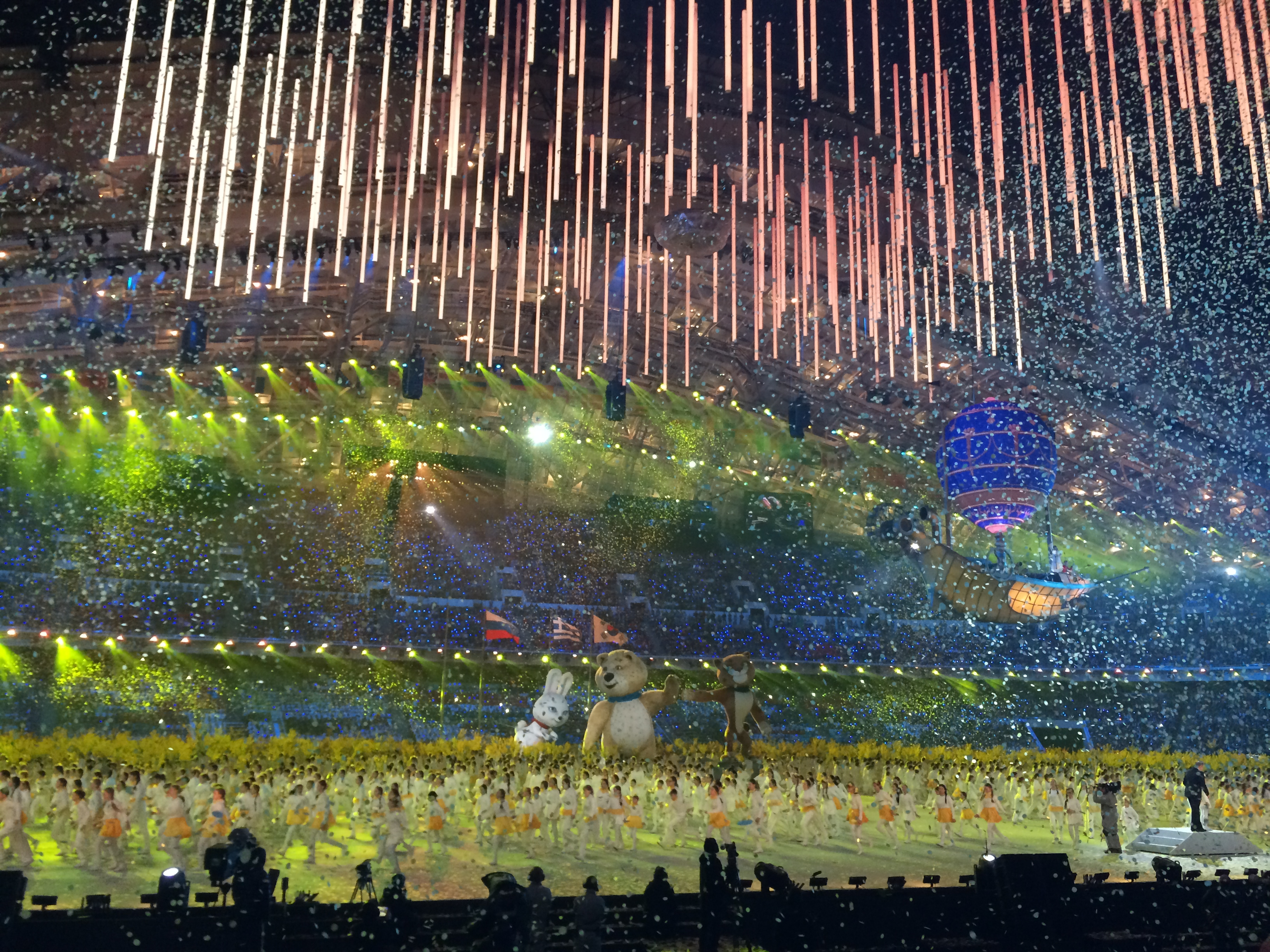
- Date: 23 February 2014; 12 years ago
- Time: 20:14 – 22:25 MSK (UTC+4)
- Venue: Fisht Olympic Stadium
- Location: Sochi, Russian Federation; 43°24′08″N 39°57′22″E
- Also known as: Reflections of Russia
- Filmed by: Olympic Broadcasting Services (OBS)

The closing ceremony of the 2014 Winter Olympics was held on 23 February 2014 from 20:14 to 22:25 MSK (UTC+4) at the Fisht Olympic Stadium in Sochi, Russia. It was designed to show Russian culture, through a European perspective, and featured performances by Yuri Bashmet, Valery Gergiev, Denis Matsuev, Hibla Gerzmava, and Tatiana Samouil, among others.

== Proceedings ==
The closing program presented "Reflections of Russia"; that is, highlights of Russian culture, presented through a European perspective. It was directed by Daniele Finzi Pasca. Konstantin Ernst served as creative director and Andrei Nasonovskiy was the executive producer.

Throughout the ceremony, sporting highlights of the Games were replayed on the screens of Fisht Stadium. A "forest" of 204 long LED light tubes changed color throughout and the audience was given LED necklaces that also changed colors periodically.

=== Opening ===
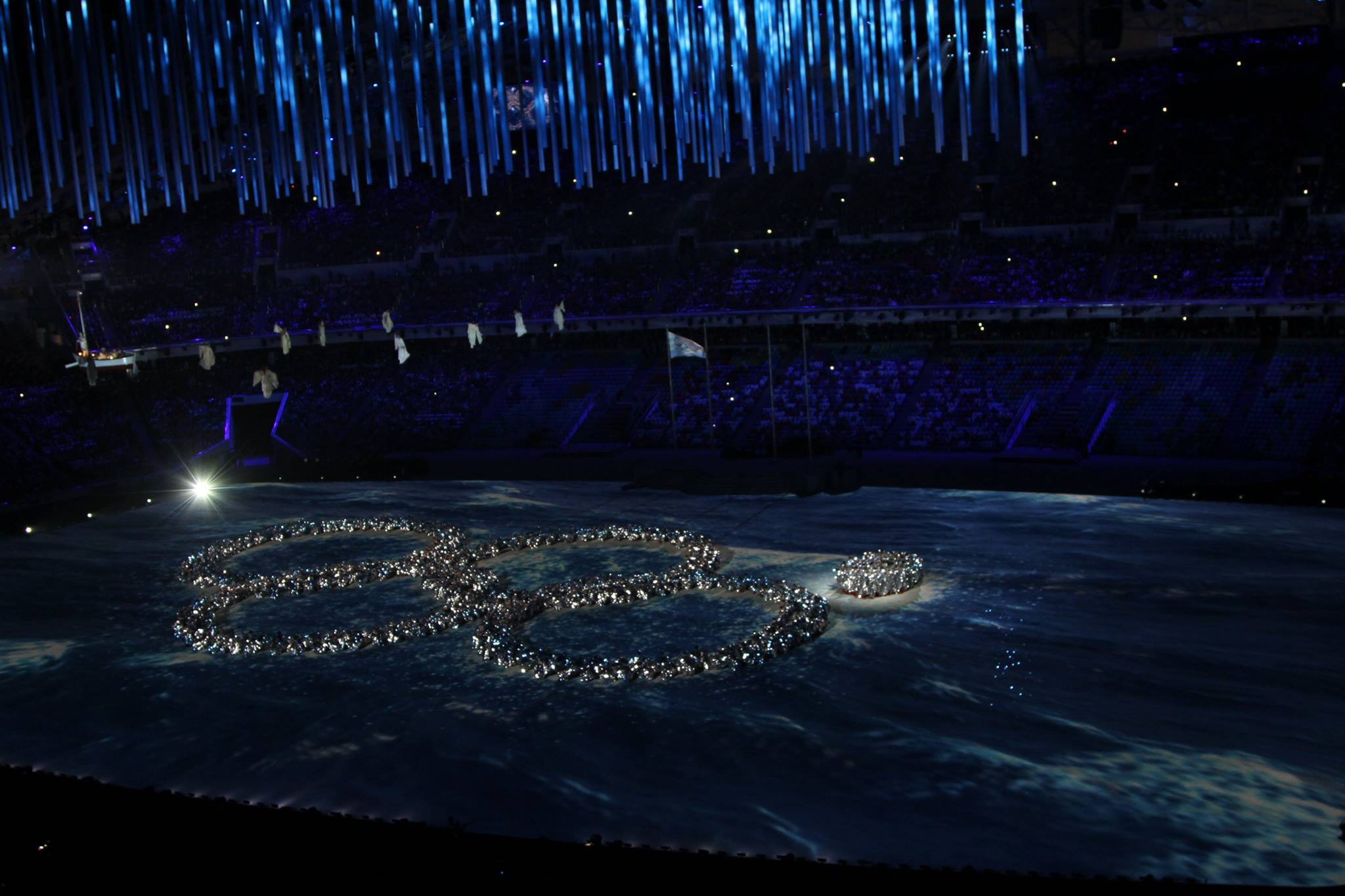
The fifth ring did not open initially.

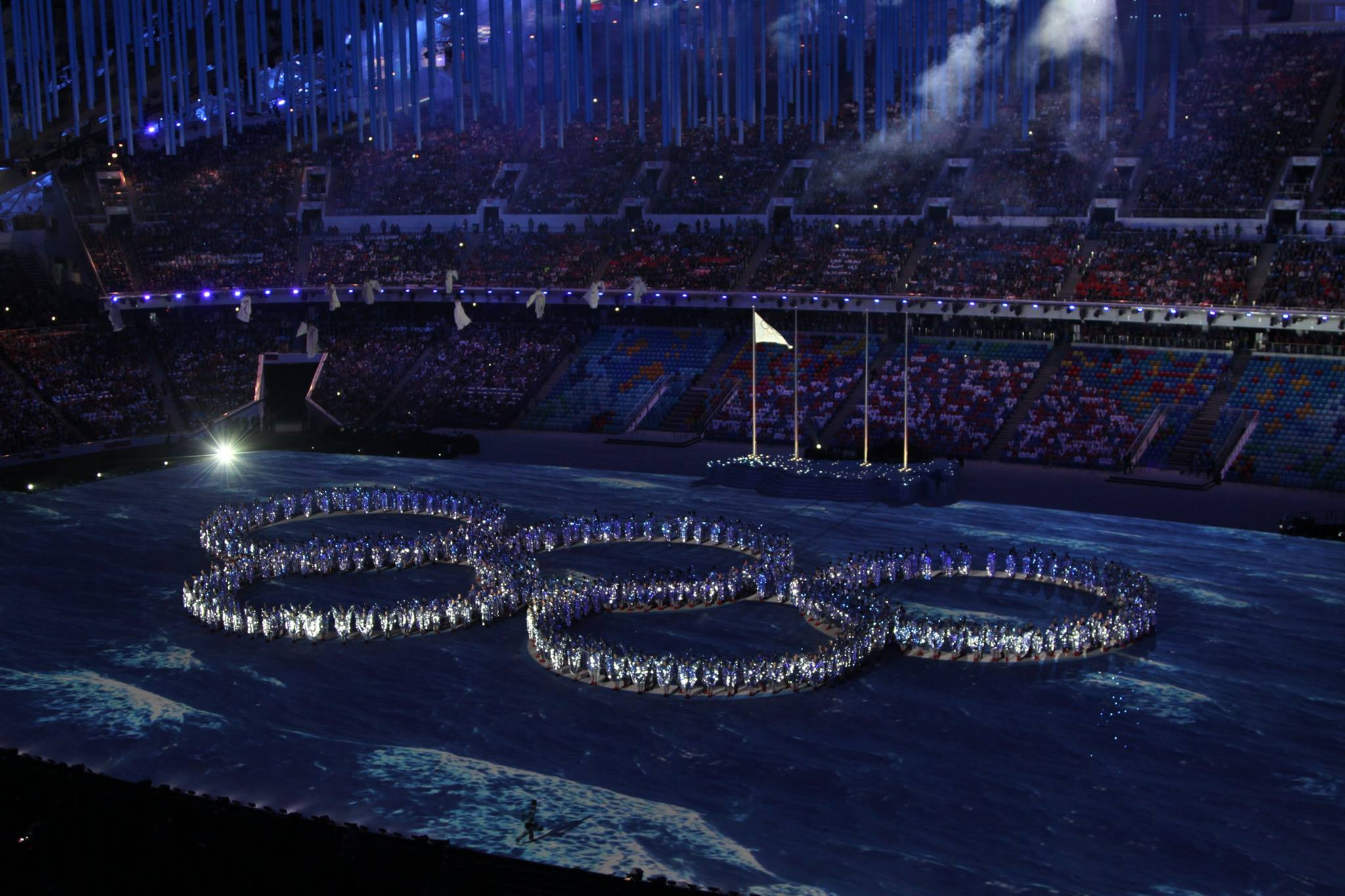
After a pause, all rings opened.

The closing ceremonies began with a countdown to the sounds of the 9th Movement of Pictures at an Exhibition by Modest Mussorgsky, at the conclusion of which the LED forest turned on. Lyubov, the girl from the opening ceremony, entered the stadium in a rowing boat with two clowns and two children named Yuri and Valentina. An image representing the Black Sea below appeared on the floor. Many volunteers appeared below them dressed as sea fish, which first form the Taegeuk symbol (a nod to Pyeongchang, the next winter Games host city), the infinity symbol and a star, then combined to form four Olympic Rings and a dot, a reference to the malfunction of one of the rings at the opening ceremony failing to open properly. After a pause, the volunteers forming the dot "opened" into the fifth Ring. The Russian flag was carried by the Russian Olympic Champions from the games.

=== National anthem ===
The Russian national anthem was performed by the All-Russian joint choir, directed by Valery Gergiev, and the Pan Russian Youth Symphony, directed by Yuri Bashmet. The Russian flag was then raised.

=== Entrance of the flag bearers and the parade of the athletes ===
The flag bearers for the participating nations then entered the stadium at the same time. More than 2800 athletes, representing 88 nations, entered the stadium. Following tradition, the athletes entered the stadium in a large group.

=== Medal ceremonies ===
Medals were awarded for the women's 30 kilometre mass start freestyle (all won by Norwegian athletes) and the men's 50 kilometre mass start freestyle (all won by Russian athletes) events. The Russian national anthem was heard for the second time at the closing ceremony: this time, in a 2012 pre-recorded performance of the London 2012 arrangement by Philip Sheppard conducting the London Philharmonic Orchestra. This was the first time since the 2006 Winter Olympics closing ceremony that a host nation's anthem was heard twice in different forms.

=== Performances ===
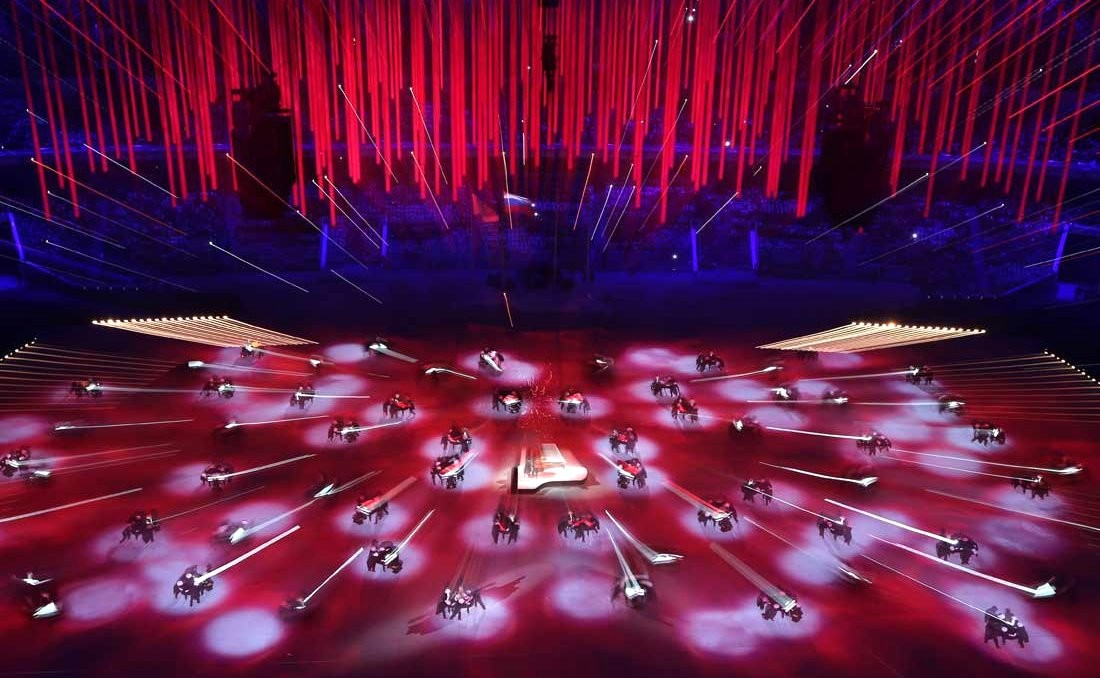
Pianist Denis Matsuev

The ceremony continued with a number of "chapters" reflecting different aspects of Russian culture. First was a scene entitled "The World of Malevich, Kandinsky and Chagall" inspired by the paintings of Marc Chagall featuring brides, fiddlers, clowns and acrobats. In the "Music" chapter, a grand piano arose from the stadium floor with pianist Denis Matsuev performing Rachmaninoff's Piano Concerto No. 2 followed by composers in white wigs and tails hitting the spotlight with 62 more pianos. In the "Theatre" chapter, dancers demonstrated the ballet cultures of Moscow (Bolshoi) and Saint Petersburg (Mariinsky) to the music of Scheherazade by Nikolai Rimsky-Korsakov. The First All-Russian Youth Symphony Orchestra accompanied the dancers.

Russian novelists, poets and playwrights including Tolstoy, Dostoyevsky, Solzhenitsyn, Gogol, Chekhov and Akhmatova were honoured during the "Literature" chapter with a photo montage emerging from under the stage. A tribute to Russia's circus heritage, entitled "The Magic of Circus", featured more than 200 professional circus performers demonstrating their craft. The chapter culminated with the erection of a giant red-and-white big top.

In total, more than 7,000 people took part in the performance and more than 43,000 scenic elements were used.

=== Handover of the Olympic flag and Pyeongchang Awaits You ===
First, the Greek flag was raised while its anthem played. The Olympic Hymn was sung and an honour guard lowered the Olympic flag. The flag was passed by Anatoly Pakhomov, the mayor of Sochi, to Thomas Bach, President of the International Olympic Committee, who then passed it to Seok-Rae Lee, the mayor of Pyeongchang, which will host the 2018 Winter Olympics. The flag was waved four times before it was taken from the stadium. It was raised again in Rio de Janeiro on 5 August 2016 during the opening ceremony of the 2016 Summer Olympics.

The 2018 Winter Olympics in Pyeongchang provided an eight-minute segment to introduce Koreans to the world. The national anthem of the Republic of Korea was sung by two South Korean children. The segment featured an elderly South Korean man playing a gayageum, a traditional Korean string instrument, with people dressed as swallows, a common bird found in Korea, and the Gangwon Province version of the traditional Korean song "Arirang", performed by Lee Seung-chul, Sumi Jo and Na Yoon-sun. Children created snowmen while images of various Winter Olympic events were shown on the stage, concluding with the logo of the 2018 Winter Olympics.

=== Games declared closed and the extinguishing of the flame ===
The games were formally closed by International Olympic Committee President Thomas Bach at 22:04 MSK, calling them 'The Athlete's Games'. He invited the world to assemble in four years' time in Pyeongchang for the 2018 Olympic Games. A final appearance was made by the three children accompanied by giant animatronic models of the three official mascots of the 2014 Olympic Games. A series of large mirrors combined and floated into the air to reveal the Olympic flame.

The Olympic flame in the stadium and outside was blown out by the Polar Bear, who shed a tear after the flame went out, which was a homage to Misha and the 1980 Summer Olympics closing ceremony, with a short clip being shown briefly. A remix of Aleksandra Pakhmutova's "Goodbye, Moscow" played and the Polar Bear extinguished the Olympic flame. The 1,000 members of the Pan-Russian Children's Choir assembled with the mascots carrying small flames in their hands and Abkazian-Russian soprano Hibla Gerzmava sung "Goodbye, Sochi!" with the children's choir to close the games. The ceremony ended with a fireworks display set to the music of Tchaikovsky. Russian DJ Kto hosted the after party.

== Music ==
- Modest Mussorgsky - 9th Movement from Pictures at an Exhibition - The Hut on Hen's Legs (Baba Yaga)
- Dimitri Tiomkin - Theme from "It's a Wonderful Life"
- Dimitri Tiomkin - Theme from "Giant"
- Pyotr Ilyich Tchaikovsky - Festival Coronation March
- Alfred Schnittke - Suite from 'The Census List'
- Max Bobkov - Theme from Medal Ceremony
- Sergei Vasilievich Rachmaninoff - Piano Concerto No. 2
- Nikolai Rimsky-Korsakov - The Sea and Sinbad's Ship
- Aram Khachaturian - Waltz from Masquerade
- Dmitri Shostakovich - The Second Waltz
- Sergei Prokofiev - Waltz from Cinderella
- Na Yoon-sun - Arirang
- Eduard Artemyev - Theme from At Home Among Strangers
- Aleksandra Pakhmutova - Goodbye, Moscow!
- Igor Krutoy and Igor Nikolayev - Goodbye, Sochi!
- Pyotr Ilyich Tchaikovsky - Piano Concerto No. 1

== Anthems ==
- Big Children's Choir/Pan-Russian Children Choir – State Anthem of the Russian Federation (Note: Anthem played again as part of the Men's 50 kilometre mass start freestyle victory ceremony.)
- London Philharmonic Orchestra – National Anthem of Greece
- London Philharmonic Orchestra – Olympic Anthem
- Two unnamed South Korean children – National Anthem of South Korea

=== Victory ceremonies ===
- National Anthem of Norway (Note: Anthem played as part of the Women's 30 kilometre mass start freestyle victory ceremony.)
