= 2014 Winter Olympic and Paralympic Games mascots =

Mascots of the 2014 Winter Olympics and Paralympics

Leopard, Hare and Polar bear Леопард, Зайка, Белый Мишка (in Russian)

Mascots of the 2014 Winter Olympics (Sochi)
- Creator: Silvia Petrova, Vadim Pak and Oleg Serdechny
- Significance: A male snow leopard, a female snow hare and a male polar bear

Snowflake and Ray of Light Снежинка, Лучик (in Russian)

Mascots of the 2014 Winter Paralympics (Sochi)
- Creator: Natalia Balashova and Anna Zhilinsky
- Significance: A female snowflake and a male ray of light

The mascots for the 2014 Winter Olympics and the 2014 Winter Paralympics were revealed on February 26, 2011. A shortlist of ten Olympic and three Paralympic designs had been shown to the public on February 7, 2011.

== History ==
=== Election ===
Along with the 2008 Russian presidential election, on 2 March 2008 there was an unofficial election held in Sochi to elect the mascot for the 2014 Winter Olympics. 270,000 voters along with their ballots received a coupon with four mascot candidates: Ded Moroz, a snowflake, a polar bear and a dolphin. According to a representative of Sochi city administration, the majority of Sochians voted for the dolphin. However, representatives of the Sochi Organizing Committee, which officially selects a logo and a mascot, commented that while respecting the opinion of Sochians, such a procedure is usually held later. They also pointed out, that the final version of the mascot should be a consensus of opinions of all citizens of the country and the result of work by professional designers and market analysts.

=== Official vote ===
A nationwide design contest was held in Russia, from September 1 to December 5, 2010. 24,000 designs were sent in for the contest.

A short list of designs were announced in December 2010, after a jury had reviewed thousands of designs. It was now down to eleven design ideas for the Olympic Games, and two design ideas for the Paralympic Games. The shortlisted designs were presented to the public on February 7, 2011. A live national TV broadcast, on Russia's Channel One, included a nationwide text message voting, where Russians voted for their favorite mascot.

- Ded Moroz (Russian: Дед Мороз) — the character, who can be thought of as Russian Santa Claus, was later removed from the list of official candidates, because if it had been chosen as mascot, it would have become the property of the IOC.
- The Brown bear (Russian: Бурый Медведь)
- The Leopard (Russian: Леопард) — Olympics Mascot
- The Polar bear (Russian: Белый Мишка) — Olympics Mascot
- The Hare (Russian: Зайка) — Olympics Mascot
- The Sun (Russian: Солнышко)
- The Ray of Light (Russian: Лучик) — Paralympics Mascot
- The Snowflake (Russian: Снежинка) — Paralympics Mascot
- The Bullfinch (Russian: Снегирь)
- The Matryoshka dolls (Russian: Матрёшки)
- The Dolphin (Russian: Дельфин)

Ray of Light and Snowflake were the two mascots selected for the Sochi 2014 Paralympic Winter Games, crafted by designers Natalia Balashova and Anna Zhilinsky.

=== Story ===
Leopard is a mountain rescuer, climber and an excellent snowboarder who lives in a huge tree on a high cliff in the Caucasus Mountains. He is the most popular out of the five.

Polar Bear lives in an igloo above the Arctic Circle, where not only the walls, but also everything else is made of snow and ice. He was raised by polar explorers who taught him to ski, skate, and curl; but most of all, he loved sledding.

Hare is an excellent student at the Forestry Academy, helps her mother at her family restaurant, "Lesnaya Zapruda," and participates in sports competitions.

Ray of Light (Russian: Luchik) has warm golden skin, green eyes, and rays of sunlight revealing from his hair. The story revolves around an alien that travels to Earth to escape the warmth on his planet and explore humanity; he finds out that he likes people and stays amongst them. He becomes friends with humans while Nordic skiing, but he feels lonely, until one day he sees a falling star coming to Earth, another alien called Snowflake. He drives a rocket made of fire.

Snowflake (Russian: Snejinka) has blue eyes, sky-blue skin and represents crystals of snow. She is an alien who wants to escape her cold planet to explore Earth. She meets her fellow alien Ray of Light and becomes friends with him. They create the sports of wheelchair curling and Para ice hockey. She drives a rocket made of ice.

== Controversy ==
Despite the success of the mascot selection process, some accusations have been brought against the mascots. The possibility of telephone vote rigging was brought up when the mascot that Prime Minister Vladimir Putin had said was his favorite. The bear was also seen by politician Sergey Mironov as resembling the mascot of the United Russia political party, the current ruling party, leading to accusations of political propaganda.

Viktor Chizhikov, the designer of the 1980 Moscow Games mascot Misha, accused the designer of the polar bear mascot (named Bely Mishka) for the 2014 Sochi Olympics of plagiarism. Chizhikov noted that the Bely's facial features were all taken from Misha, saying "they just pumped him up and made him fatter". Chizhikov also complained that Bely and the other two mascots (the Hare and Leopard) was lacking personality. As a result of these issues, as well as being denied the copyright to Misha, Chizhikov declined to help when asked by the organizers of the 2014 Winter Olympics closing ceremony.

Zoich (or ZOIЧ) was a proposed mascot for the XXII Winter Olympics, which took first place in the official online poll to select a mascot for the 2014 Sochi games. Despite being a popular Internet character, the committee chose not to introduce it to the final round of the voting. Upon introduction and until the end of the online voting, it was the most popular mascot from those submitted. It also took only about 40 minutes for Zoich to take the top spot. Due to this, he was acknowledged on the mascot of the Sochi 2014 as an Easter egg.

== See also ==
- Misha, the mascot for the 1980 Moscow Olympics
- Zoich, a rejected mascot for the Sochi 2014 Olympics

Preceded by Wenlock	Olympic mascot Leopard, Zaika and Bely Mishka; Sochi 2014	Succeeded by Vinicius
Preceded by Mandeville	Paralympic mascot Luchik and Snezhinka; Sochi 2014	Succeeded by Tom
