= Roni (mascot) =

Mascot of the 1980 Winter Olympics in Lake Placid

Mascot of the 1980 Winter Olympics (Lake Placid)
- Creator: Don Moss
- Significance: A raccoon

Roni is the Olympic mascot of the 1980 Winter Olympics in Lake Placid, created by Don Moss. The mascot is a raccoon, which is a familiar animal from the mountainous region of the Adirondacks where Lake Placid is situated. The name Roni comes from the word racoon in Iroquoian, the language of the native people from the region of the State of New York and Lake Placid, and was chosen by Lake Placid school children.

Part of his face and the black-and-white mask around his eyes are a nod to the sunglasses and hat worn by competitors. There are different versions of Roni, practising different sports and the five colours of the Olympic rings can be found on some versions.

Lake Placid had a live four-legged mascot, a raccoon called Rocky. Before the Games started he was controversially replaced by a costumed human mascot renamed Roni.

Serving as the face of the XIII Olympic Winter Games, Hawaiian-American Kriss Lambert performed as Roni Raccoon attired head-to-toe inside a 2-meter (6'6") raccoon outfit. Kriss was filmed doing every event - except ski jump - prior to the Olympic Games, with the taped footage televised during the Games to introduce each event. Lambert also popularly represented the 1980 Lake Placid Olympics at major events such as the Macy's Day Parade, Super Bowl XIV, etc. in lead-up to the Olympic Games. He was rinkside generating excitement during the men's ice hockey medal-round game between four-time defending gold medalists USSR and hosts USA which the USA won 4-3 (the so-called "Miracle on Ice" - an iconic highlight of the Games).

== Notes ==
Preceded by Amik; Montréal 1976	Olympic mascot Roni; Lake Placid 1980	Succeeded by Misha; Moscow 1980
