= Vučko (mascot) =

1984 Sarajevo Winter Olympic mascot

Mascot of the 1984 Winter Olympics (Sarajevo)
- Creator: Jože Trobec
- Significance: A wolf

Vučko (Serbo-Croatian Cyrillic: Вучко) is the Olympic mascot of the 1984 Winter Olympics in Sarajevo. It was created by the Slovenian painter Jože Trobec. The mascot is a wolf, many of which live in the Dinaric Alps, where Sarajevo is located. Through his smiling, frightened or serious facial expressions, Vučko gave the wolf a friendly appearance, helping to transform the often fierce image which the animal previously enjoyed.

The mascot was chosen through a contest entered by 836 participants. After an initial selection, six projects were chosen. The other proposals were a snowball, a mountain goat, a weasel, a lamb and a hedgehog. Readers of various newspapers and magazines could later vote for the final mascot. In the final poll, Vučko received more votes than all the other candidate mascots combined.

In the years following the Olympic Games, Vučko has remained a symbol of Sarajevo, often appearing in signs, advertisements, and gift shops around the city. Because of the sporadic and often unexpected placement of images of Vučko, the mascot is also known as the “Sneaky Fox of Sarajevo” (Podmukli Lisac iz Sarajeva).

| Preceded by Misha; Moscow 1980 | Olympic mascot Vučko; Sarajevo 1984 | Succeeded by Sam; Los Angeles 1984 |
