= Sam (mascot) =

Official mascot of the 1984 Summer Olympics in Los Angeles

- Sam the Olympic Eagle

Mascot of the 1984 Summer Olympics (Los Angeles)
- Creator: Bob Moore
- Significance: Bald eagle

Sam the Olympic Eagle was the mascot of the 1984 Summer Olympics which were held in Los Angeles. He is a bald eagle, the national bird and national animal of the host nation, the United States. The United States originally intended to use a bear mascot to represent California, but the Soviet Union had used a bear mascot named Misha at the preceding 1980 Summer Olympics. The mascot was designed by Bob Moore, an artist working for The Walt Disney Company.

Sam would go on to feature in McDonald's merchandise, as an attraction at Disneyland, and as the protagonist of a Japanese anime series titled Eagle Sam.

Preceded by Vučko	Olympic mascot Sam; Los Angeles 1984	Succeeded by Hidy and Howdy
