= Russian Bear =

Russian national symbol

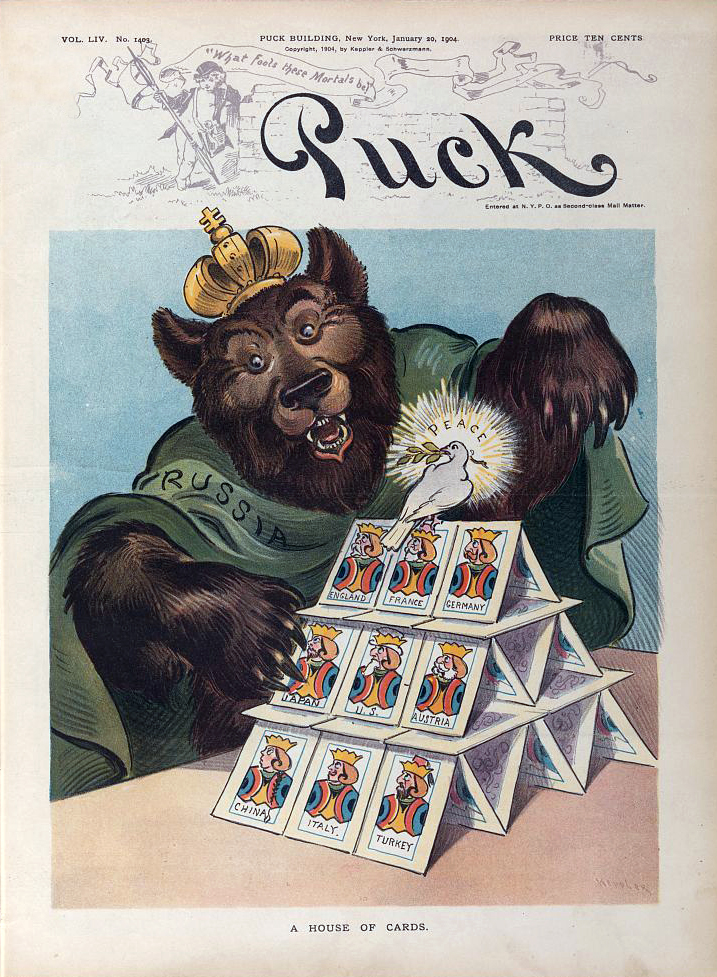
American political cartoon in Puck, 1904

The Russian Bear (Russian: Русский медведь, romanized: Russkiy medved') is a widespread symbol (generally of a Eurasian brown bear) for Russia, used in cartoons, articles, and dramatic plays since as early as the 16th century, and relating alike to the Russian Empire, the Russian Provisional Government and Russian Republic, the Soviet Union, and the present-day Russian Federation.

The vast majority of the world's brown bears are found in Russia.

The uses of the bear are mixed. It was often used by Westerners, in British caricatures and later also used in the United States, often not in a positive context. On occasion it was used to imply that Russia is "big, brutal and clumsy". However, Russians have also used it to represent their country, where it has been used as a "symbol of national pride."

== Early history ==
=== Use in Russian coats of arms ===
There have been a few examples of Russians depicting bears in coats of arms, mainly showing polar bears and brown bears. The Novgorod Oblast coat of arms and flag include two brown bears. The coat of arms of the Mari El Republic is a red bear with a sword and shield. The coats of arms of Nenets Autonomous Okrug and Chukotka Autonomous Okrug have polar bears. Meanwhile, the Republic of Karelia and Khabarovsk Krai have black bears in their coat of arms.

In the case of Perm Krai and the Republic of Karelia, a bear symbolizes how Orthodox Christianity took over from bear cults. Despite the bear's symbolism inside Russia, the local coat of arms uses the bear to reflect the region and its history rather than Russia as a whole.

== Beginning of the use in the West ==
The idea of the Russian bear that pushes Russianness first appeared not in Russia but in the West, but it is unknown when the Russian bear was first used. One of the earliest usages of the Russian bear was from William Shakespeare's Macbeth in Act 3, Scene 4. Where Shakespeare referred to a "rugged Russian bear."

=== In Maps ===
Multiple maps from the 17th to the 20th centuries show Russia as inhabited and represented by bears. The maps started with small bears to represent Russia. This correlation of bears with Russia led one scholar to suggest that the West viewed Russia as "realms for wild animals". Over time, these bears started to represent the entire country. In the end, the bears became connected with the idea of Russia, rather than small animals on the map, especially through satirical maps.

=== In cartoons ===
The Russian bear has also been depicted in political cartoons, especially in the British publication Punch and the American Puck. One of the earliest uses of the bear's connection to Russia was in the late 18th century, when a British cartoon put Catherine the Great's head on a body of a bear ridden by Russian General Grigory Potemkin. The Napoleonic Wars also had bears used to represent Russia alongside other animals, such as the Lion of England. During the Crimean War, Russia was portrayed as a bear multiple times, especially in Punch cartoons showing a bear holding a turkey representing the Ottoman Empire which is given the subtitle "Turkey in danger?" Representation of the Russian bear continued in cartoons throughout the 19th century and the early 20th century. In the First World War, many Punch cartoons referred to Russia using a bear to represent the empire.

The cartoons, however, did not always represent Russia through war or expansion but also used the bear to describe internal problems. Sometimes the bear is shown as injured from war or internal problems. Especially after the January Uprising in Poland, a Russian bear is portrayed fighting a woman who represents the Poles.

== Use in the Soviet era ==
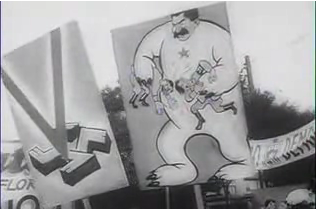
A caricature of Joseph Stalin as a bear during a pro-Allied rally in Santiago, Chile, 1943

The bear image was, on various occasions also taken up by Russians themselves, particularly during the 20th century. Having the bear cub "Misha" as the mascot of the 1980 Moscow Olympic Games was evidently intended to counter the "big, brutal Russian Bear" image with a small, cuddly, and smiling bear cub.

In Ronald Reagan's successful campaign to be re-elected President of the United States in 1984, he used the bear motif in the famous "Bear in the woods" ad. It claimed that Reagan recognized the existence of a Soviet threat to the United States and the "First World", while his opponent Walter Mondale denied its existence.

== Use in post-1991 Russia ==
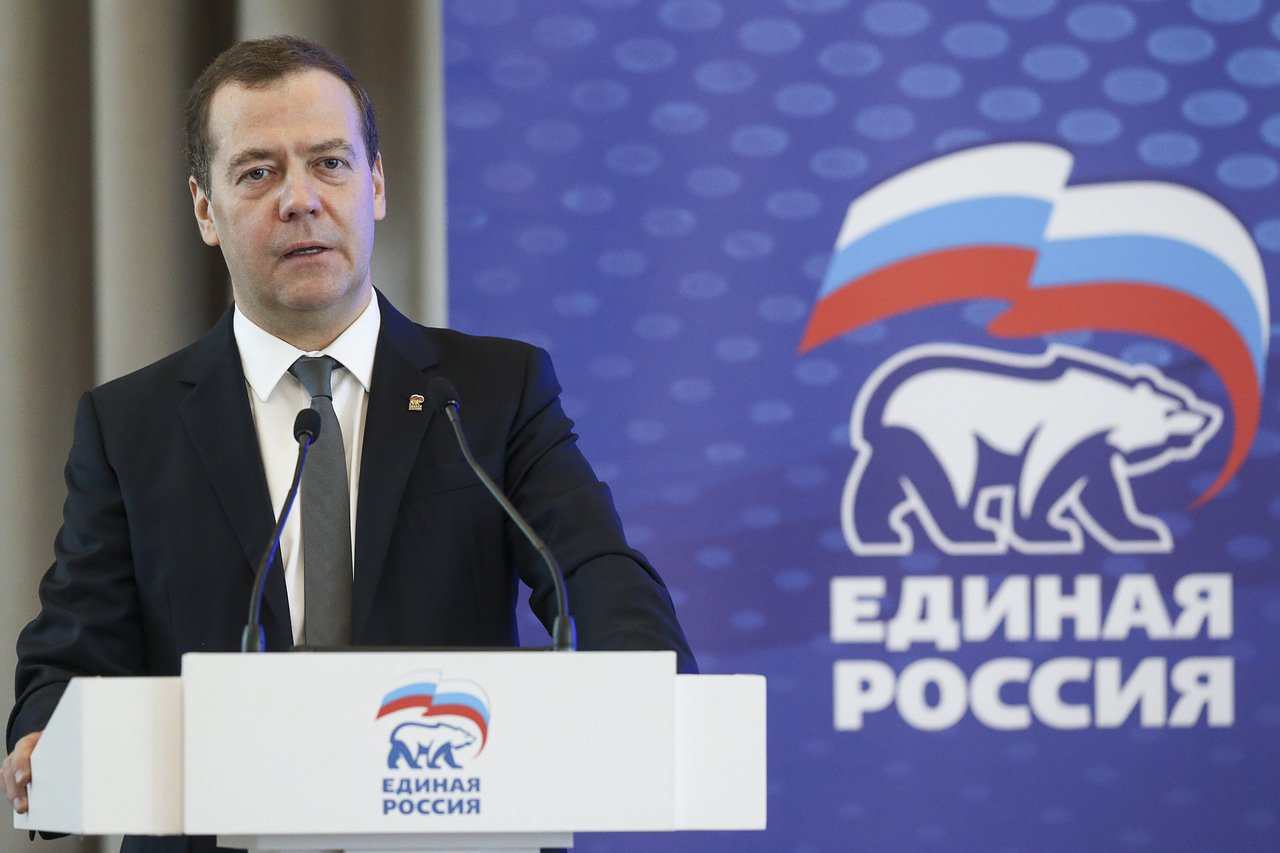
United Russia, the main political party in Russia, uses a bear in its logo.

After the dissolution of the Soviet Union, there was some support in the Russian Parliament for having a bear as the new Russian coat of arms, with supporters pointing out that "Russia is anyway identified in the world with the Bear". Eventually, however, it was the Tsarist-era coat of arms of the double-headed eagle that was restored.

In Russia, associations with the image of the bear have received relatively mixed reactions. On one hand, Russians themselves appreciate the bear for its raw power and cunning, and bears are very often used as mascots or as a part of a design on a logo. On the other hand, the overuse of the image of the bear by foreigners visiting Russia prior to 20th century led to the image of bear being a sort of insider joke that postulates that "Russian streets are full of bears" as an example of factually-inaccurate information about Russia.

Later, the bear was taken up as the symbol of the United Russia Party, which has dominated political life in Russia since the early 2000s. Coincidentally, the surname of Dmitry Medvedev, the Russian president elected in 2008, is an inflectional form of the word медведь, thus meaning "of the bears".

== Gallery ==
=== From Russia ===
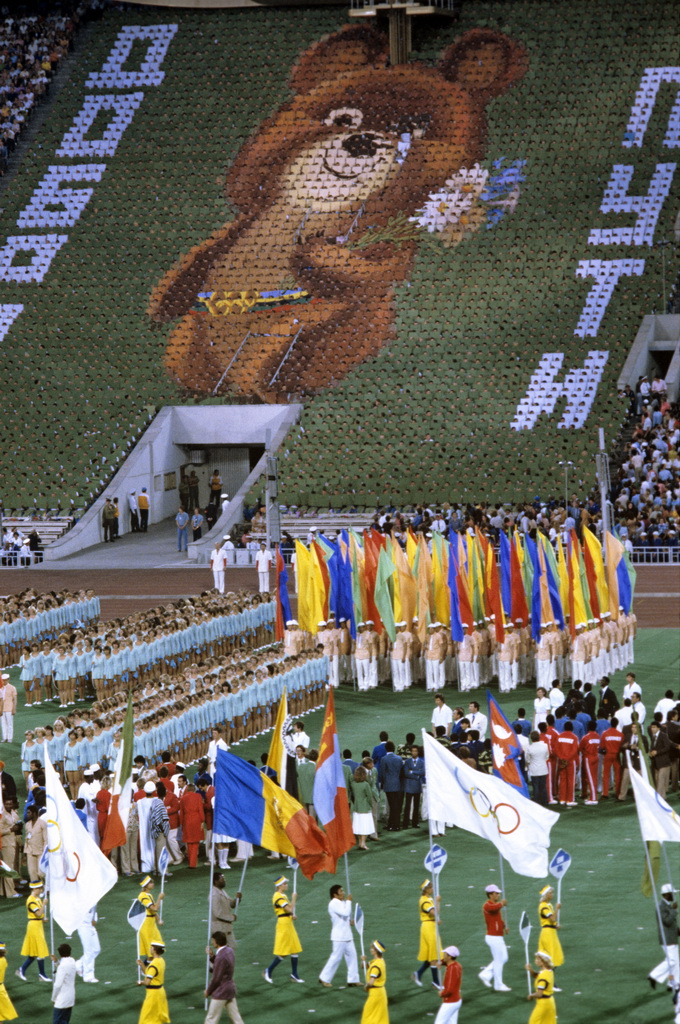
Misha the teddy bear, the mascot of Moscow Olympics (1980)

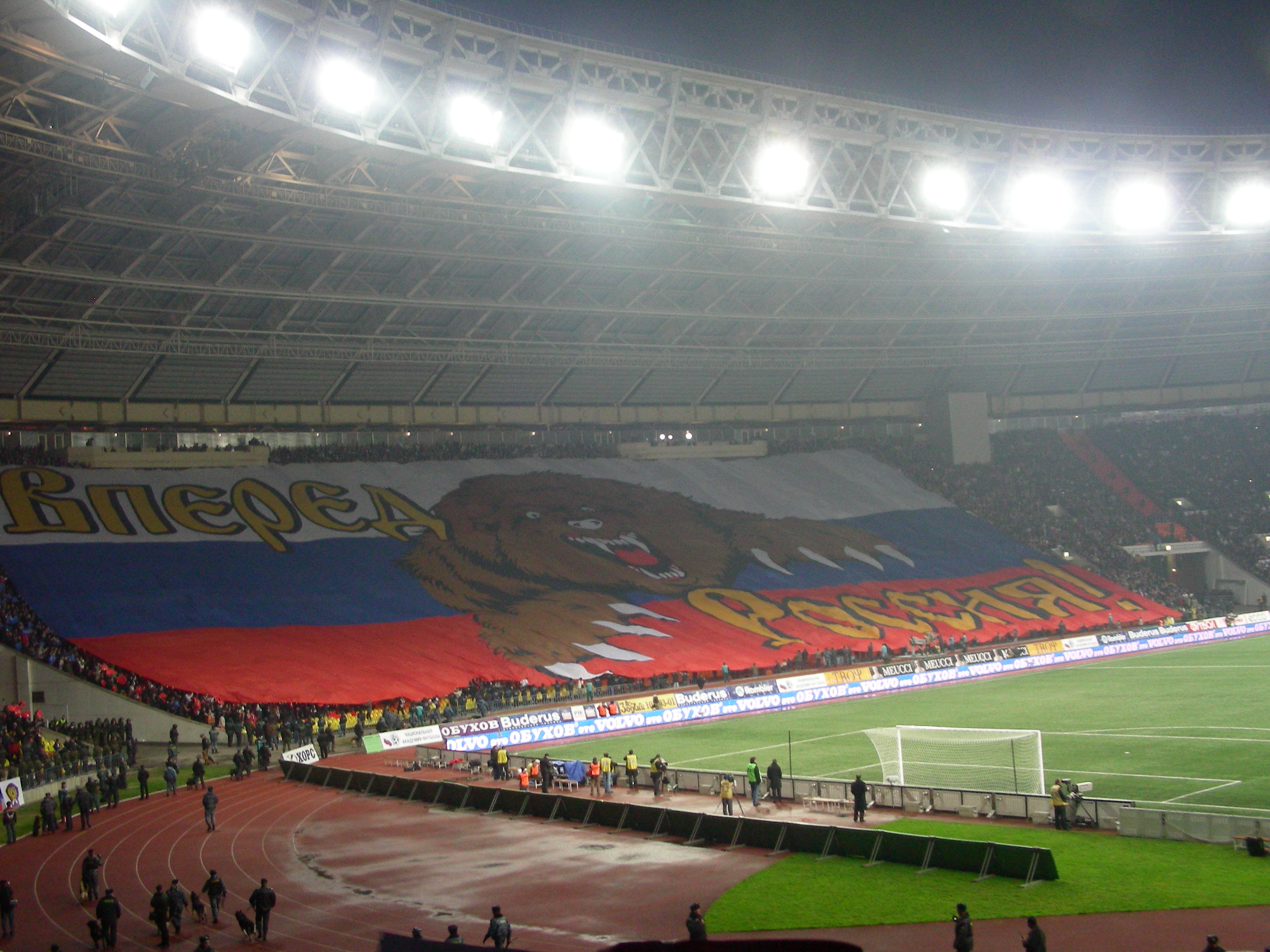
Banner depicting the Russian Bear unfurled by Russian football supporters (the inscription says "Forward, Russia!").

Coat of arms of Novgorod

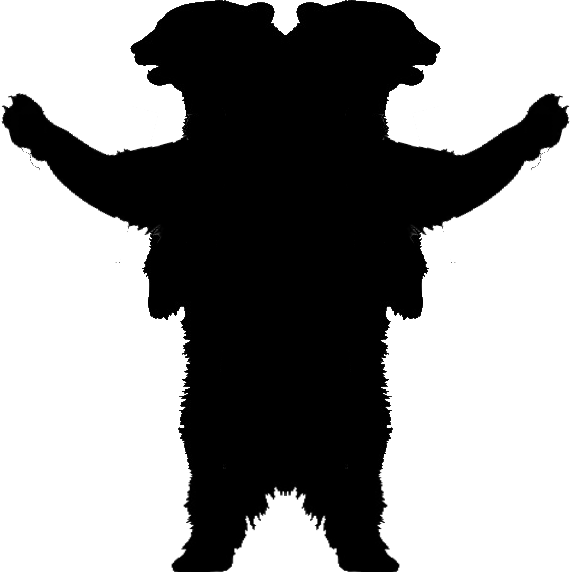
A humorous image of a four-pawed double-headed bear posing as a double-headed eagle

=== From outside Russia ===
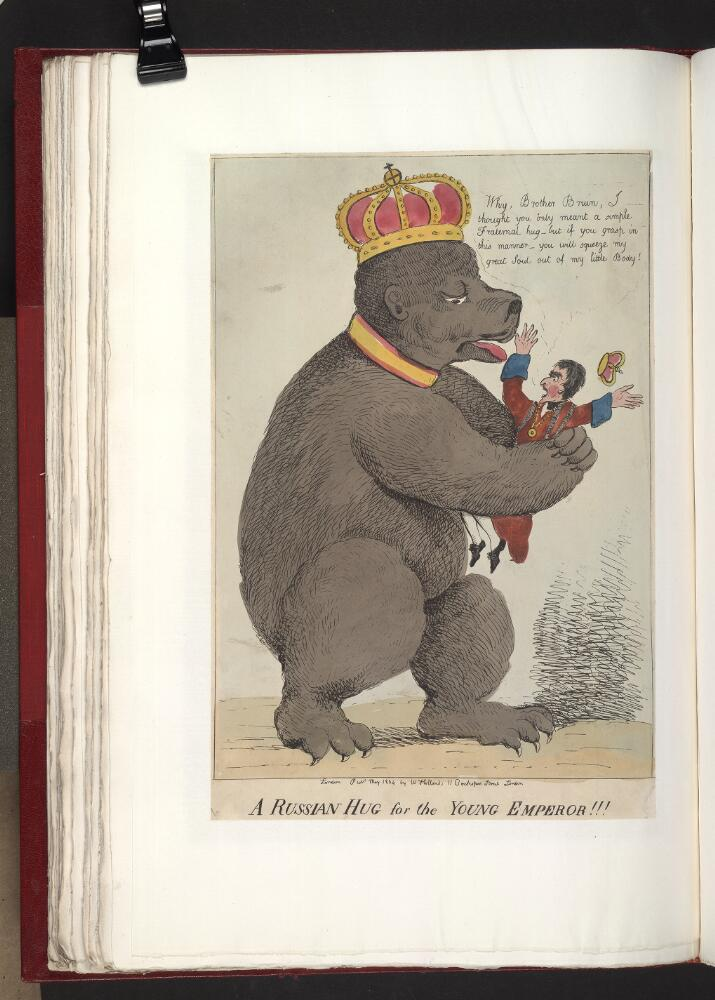
1804 British political cartoon on Franco-Russian relations.

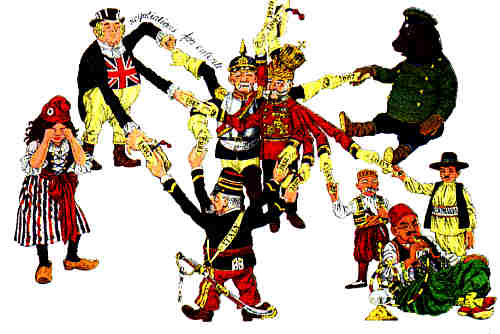
The Russian Bear (sitting, to the right) among the European powers courted by Bismarck to isolate France.

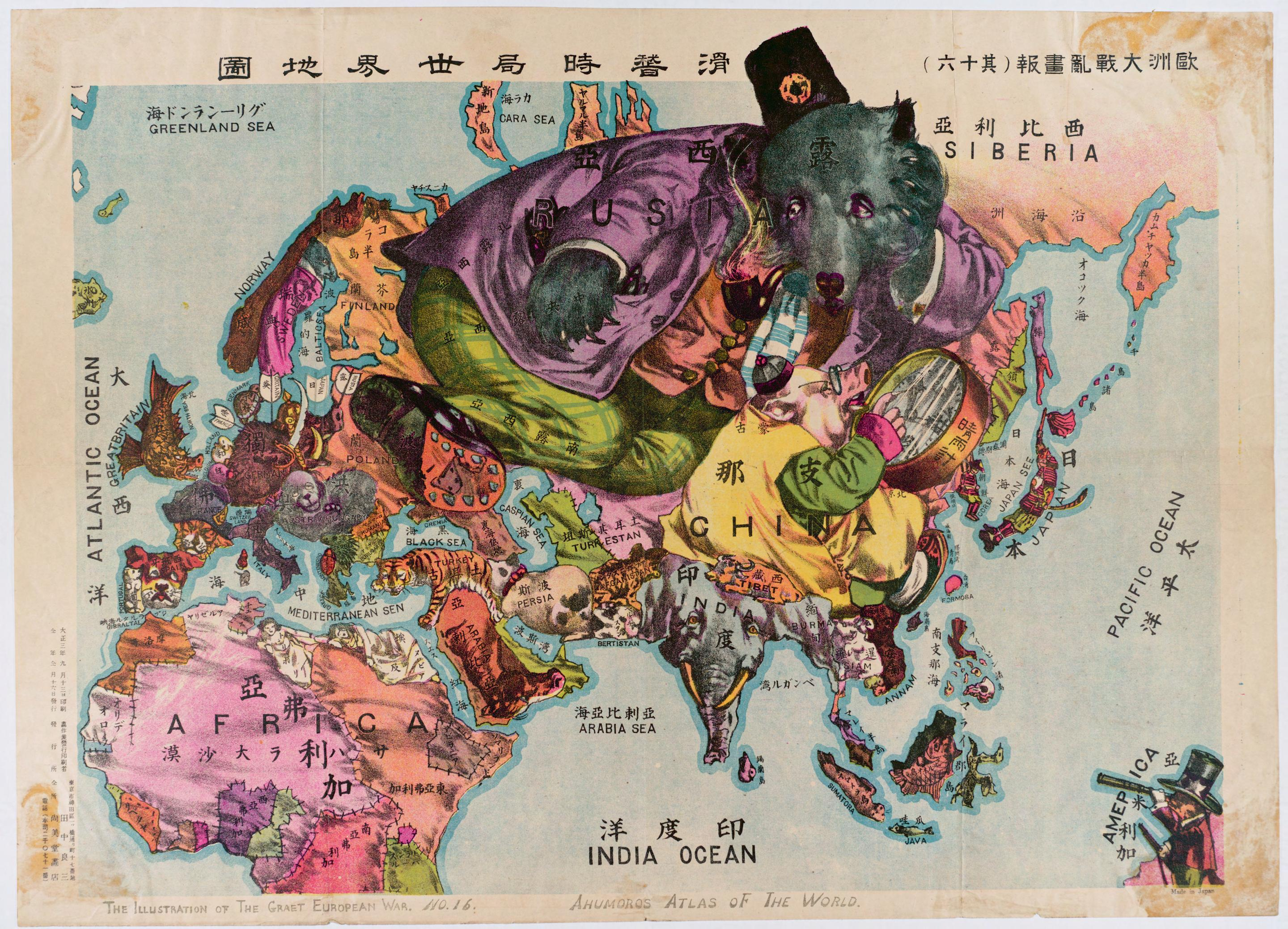
A humorous Japanese world map representing Russia as a big bear

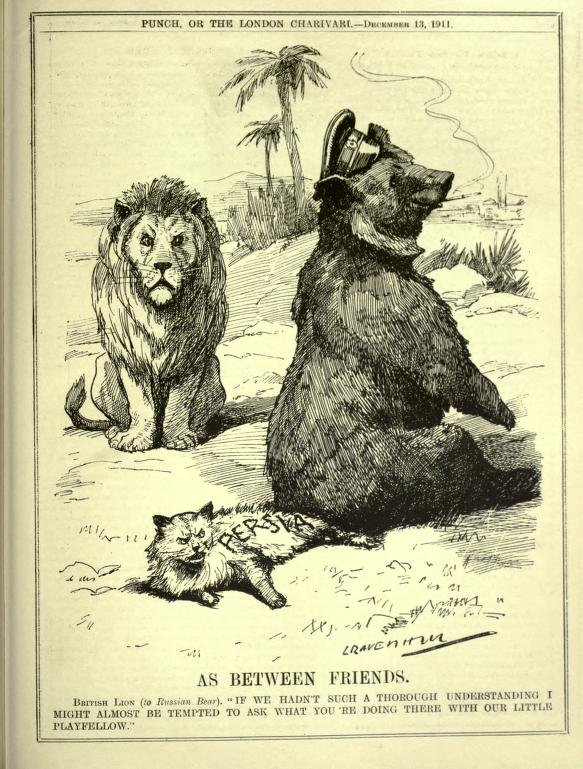
Cartoon from the English satirical magazine Punch, or The London Charivari. With the Russian Bear sitting on the tail of the Persian cat while the British Lion looks on, it represents a phase of The Great Game. The caption reads: "AS BETWEEN FRIENDS. British Lion (to Russian Bear). 'IF WE HADN'T SUCH A THOROUGH UNDERSTANDING I MIGHT ALMOST BE TEMPTED TO ASK WHAT YOU'RE DOING THERE WITH OUR LITTLE PLAYFELLOW.'"

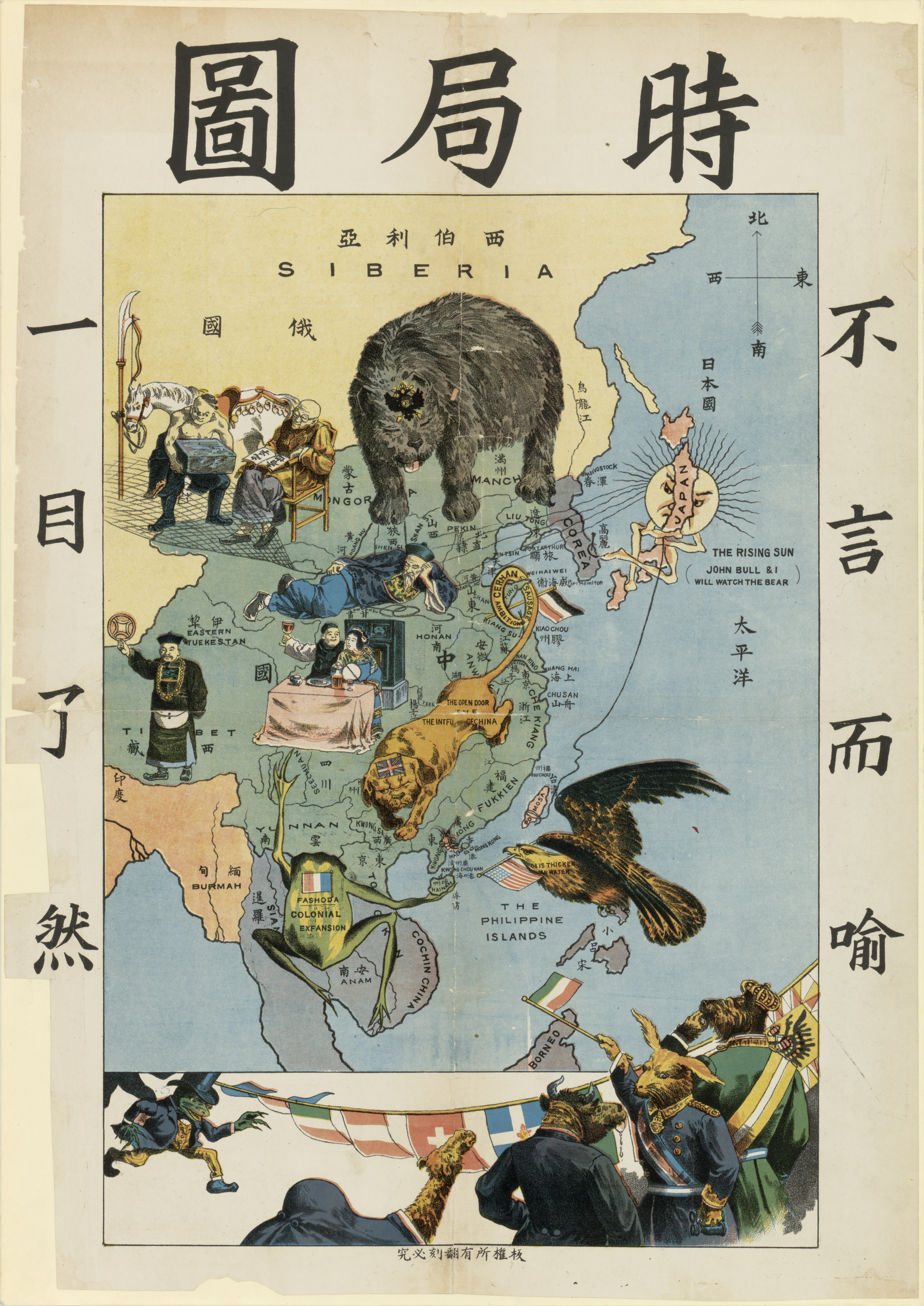
Chinese view of THE SITUATION IN THE FAR EAST, 1905. Bear for Russia intruding from the north, bulldog for the United Kingdom in south China, frog for France in southeast Asia, and American eagle for the United States approaching from the Philippines.

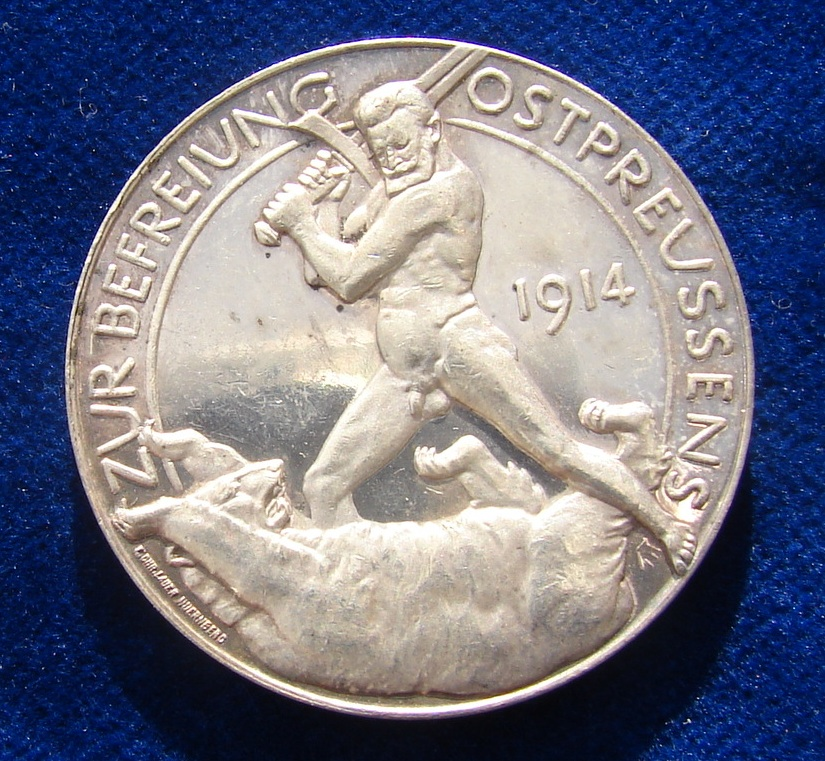
The reverse of a World War I German Silver medallion liberation of East Prussia 1914 by Paul von Beneckendorff und von Hindenburg. Referring to the Battle of Tannenberg. The naked General Hindenburg fighting the Russian Bear with his sword.

== See also ==
- Bear in heraldry
- Flag of California ("Bear Flag")
