= Schneemann and Sonnenweiberl =

Official mascot of the 1976 Winter Olympics in Innsbruck, Austria

Mascots of the 1976 Winter Olympics (Innsbruck)
- Creator: Walter Pötsch; Bill Tobin
- Significance: A Tyrolean snowman A sun woman

Schneemann ([ˈʃneːˌman], "snowman" in German), also known as Schneemandl, was the official mascot of the 1976 Winter Olympics, which were held in Innsbruck, Austria in February 1976. It was the first official Winter Olympic mascot. There was also a secondary mascot, Sonnenweiberl ("sun woman" in Austrian dialect).

Schneemann was a Tyrolean snowman created by Walter Pötsch, and represents the Games of Simplicity. It wore a Tyrolean hat which is a typical hat worn in the region of Innsbruck. The public's opinion of this was somewhat divided, but its financial success was indisputable. Schneemann was also considered a lucky charm. At the 1964 Games in Innsbruck, the lack of snow remained ingrained in the memory, and the organisers feared a similar scenario for 1976. But the 1976 Winter Games had plenty of snow.

Sonnenweiberl and Schneemann were married in a ceremony on February 22, 1976, on Innsbruck's Goldenes Dachl. The two mascots released the 1976 Winter Olympic song "Schneeplattler", which was distributed throughout the German-speaking world.

Preceded by Waldi	Olympic mascot Schneemann and Sonnenweiberl; Innsbruck 1976	Succeeded by Amik
