= Misha =

Official mascot of the 1980 Summer Olympics in Moscow

Misha Миша (in Russian)
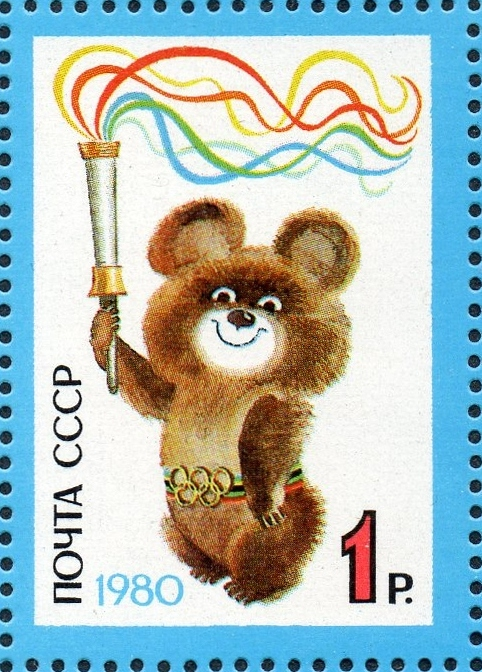
- Misha on a Soviet stamp (1980)

Mascot of the 1980 Summer Olympics (Moscow)
- Creator: Victor Chizhikov
- Significance: Russian Bear

Misha (Russian: Миша), also known as Mishka (Russian: Мишка) or The Olympic Mishka (Russian: Олимпийский Мишка, romanized: Olimpiyskiy Mishka), is the name of the Russian Bear mascot of the 1980 Moscow Olympic Games (the XXII Summer Olympics). He was designed by children's books illustrator Victor Chizhikov.

Misha is the first mascot of a sporting event to achieve large-scale commercial success in merchandise. The Misha doll was used extensively during the opening and closing ceremonies, appeared on several merchandise products and had both an animated short film (animated by Soyuzmultfilm) and a television series (animated by Nippon Animation), all of which are now common practice not only in the Olympic Games, but also in the FIFA World Cup and other events' mascots.

== Origins ==
In 1977, the committee organizing the Olympics held a contest for the best illustration of a bear. The judges chose Victor Chizhikov's design depicting a smiling bear cub wearing a blue-black-yellow-green-red (colors of the Olympic rings) weightlifter's belt, with a golden buckle shaped like the five rings. Misha's design of a small, cuddly and smiling bear cub was evidently intended to counter the "big and brutal Russian Bear". Misha was confirmed as an official mascot on 19 December 1977. Chizhikov complained that the country reneged on a promise to grant him the copyright to his bear which deprived him of royalties, although the Russian Olympic Committee stated "in accordance with the Olympic Charter, after Dec. 31 of the year in which the Olympic Games had been held, all the rights to the intellectual property and the symbols of the Olympics go the International Olympic Committee".

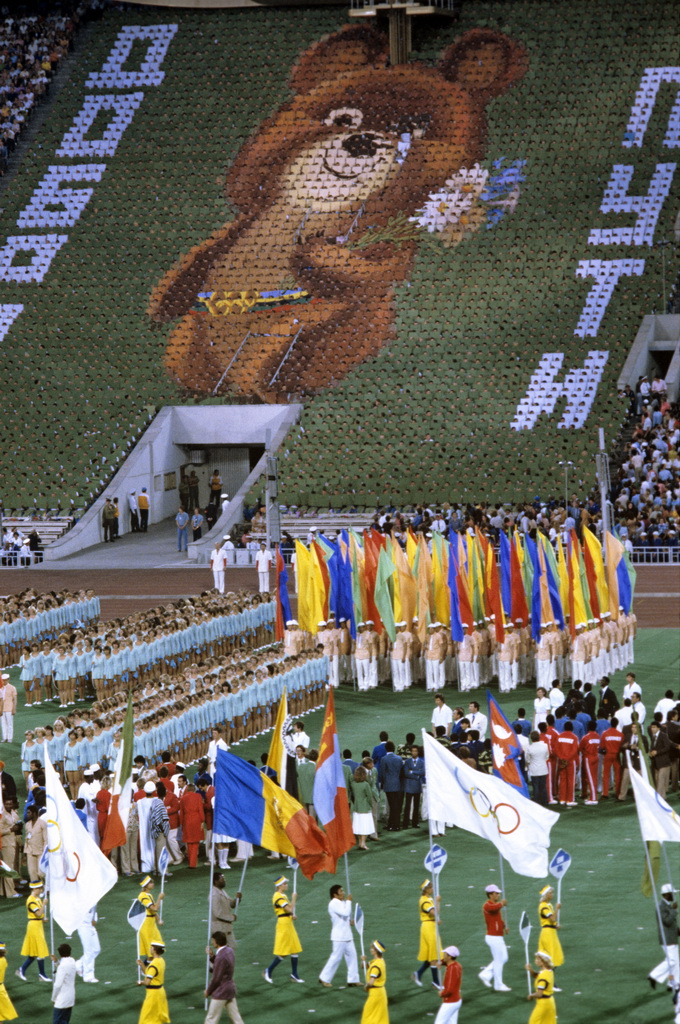
Placard of Misha shedding tears at 1980 Summer Olympics closing ceremony

During the closing ceremony of the 1980 Olympic Games, a giant effigy of Misha the Bear holding a cluster of balloons was paraded in the stadium. On one side of the stadium where the Olympic Torch was situated, there was a placard mural of Misha which shed tears of happiness from his left eye. At the end of the ceremony, Misha with his balloons was released and rose in the air away from the stadium, and this nostalgic moment has been fondly remembered by Russians. A few hours later Misha landed on Vorobyovy Gory and later was exhibited at the Exhibition Centre.

== Legacy ==
Misha's designer, Viktor Chizhikov, accused the designer of the polar bear mascot (named Bely Mishka, said to be Misha's grandson) for the 2014 Sochi Olympics of plagiarism. Chizhikov noted that the Bely's facial features were all taken from Misha, saying "they just pumped him up and made him fatter". Chizhikov also complained that Bely and the other two mascots (the Hare and Leopard) was lacking personality. As a result of these issues, as well as being denied the copyright to Misha, Chizhikov declined to help when asked by the organizers of the 2014 Winter Olympics closing ceremony.

A short clip of the 1980 Summer Olympics closing ceremony of Misha's departure was shown in the closing ceremony of the 2014 Winter Olympics. Afterwards, the giant animatronic polar bear Mishka blew out the 2014 Games Olympic torch and shed a tear (in a nod to Misha's tears during the end of the 1980 Games).

== See also ==
- Olympic mascot
- Russian Bear

Preceded by Roni; Lake Placid 1980	Olympic mascot Misha; Moscow 1980	Succeeded by Vučko; Sarajevo 1984
