= Amik =

Official mascot of the 1976 Summer Olympics in Montreal

Mascot of the 1976 Summer Olympics (Montreal)
- Creator: Guy St-Arnaud, Yvon Laroche and Pierre-Yves Pelletier, under the direction of Georges Huel
- Significance: A beaver

Amik is the mascot of the 1976 Summer Olympics. In the Algonquin language, amik means "beaver." A national competition was held to name it. The beaver or "amik" was chosen as mascot because it is an animal strongly associated with Canada, the country where the games were held. The beaver also represents hard work.

Amik came with either a red stripe with the logo of the Montreal Olympics or a multicoloured ribbon representing the Montreal Olympic Organizing Committee. Amik was designed by Guy St-Arnaud, Yvon Laroche, and Pierre-Yves Pelletier, under the direction of Georges Huel.

Preceded by Schneemann and Sonnenweiberl; Innsbruck 1976	Olympic mascot Amik; Montreal 1976	Succeeded by Roni; Lake Placid 1980
