= Victor Chizhikov =

Russian illustrator (1935–2020)

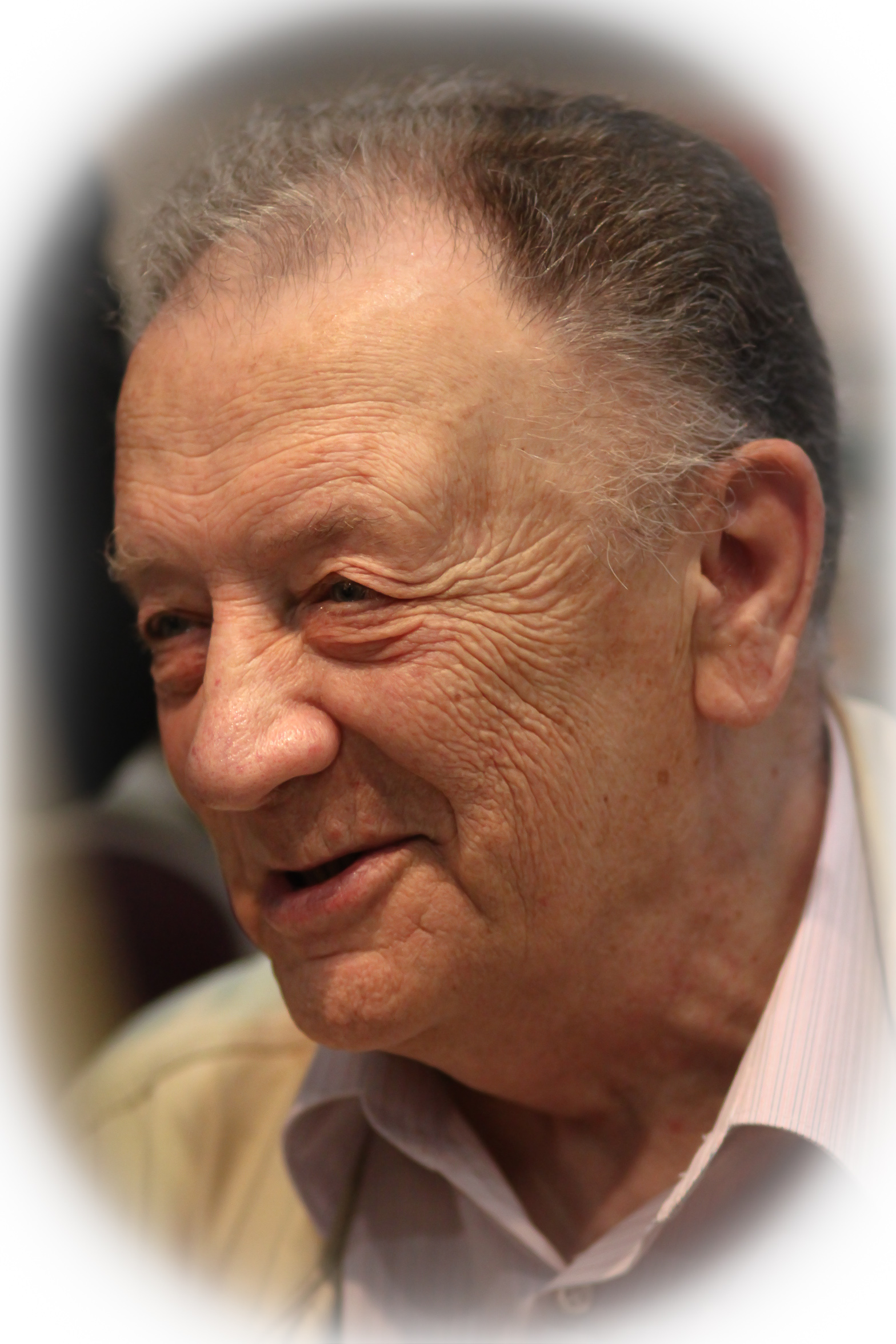
Chizhikov in 2011

Victor Alexandrovich Chizhikov (Russian: Виктор Александрович Чижиков; 26 September 1935 – 20 July 2020) was a Russian children's book illustrator and the designer of the Olympic mascot, Misha, of the 1980 Moscow Olympic Games (the XXII Summer Olympics).

Chizhikov illustrated more than 100 children's books. He worked closely with writers Eduard Uspensky and Andrei Usachev.

== Selected books ==
- Юбилейный альбом «Виктор Чижиков. Мои истории о художниках книги и о себе». Издательский Дом Мещерякова. (2015)
- 333 Kота (2005)
- Доктор Айболит (2003)
- Петя и Потап (2002)
- Аля, Кляксич и буква `А` (2002)
- Площадь картонных часов (2001)
- Винни-Пух и все-все-все (2001)
- Было у бабушки сорок внучат (2001)
- Приключения Чиполлино. Сказка (2001)
- Забытый день рождения (2001)
- Вниз по волшебной реке (1979)
- Приключения волшебного лебедя (1978)
