= List of Around the World with Willy Fog episodes =

The following is a list of episodes of the animated television series Around the World with Willy Fog and its sequel Willy Fog 2.

== Around the World with Willy Fog ==
The original series was produced in 1983 by Spanish BRB Internacional and Televisión Española with animation by Japanese studio Nippon Animation, based on Around the World in Eighty Days by Jules Verne, featuring various anthropomorphic animals with the main protagonists as felines (except Tico) and the main antagonists as canines. A narrator introduced each episode at the beginning and summarized the upcoming episodes at the end of each episode, similar to the format of BRB's Dogtanian and the Three Muskehounds. The opening song was Around the World with Willy Fog and the closing credits song was Sílbame (aka Rigodon) by Mocedades.

=== Episode list ===
No.	Title	Original release date
1	"The Wager"	August 1, 1983
Willy Fog hires Rigodon, a former circus performer, to replace the butler he dismissed the previous day and, unknowingly, hires Rigodon's friend, Tico, at the same time. Later, Fog tells his fellows at London's Reform Club that he has read an article which suggests one can travel around the world in eighty days. To prove to his skeptical colleagues that this is possible, he wagers half his £40,000 fortune that he can make the journey.
2	"Bon Voyage"	August 2, 1983
As Fog, Rigodon and Tico begin their journey, Mr. Sullivan (one of the four who bet against Fog) hires a cunning master of disguise known as Transfer to sabotage the expedition. Meanwhile, Inspector Dix and Constable Bully of Scotland Yard discover that Fog matches the description of the suspect in a recent robbery at the Bank of England and are sent to trail him.
3	"The Mysterious Mademoiselle"	August 3, 1983
Transfer, disguised as a French lady, attempts to lead Fog and his party astray in Paris, only to be thwarted by Rigodon and Tico in the woods on the outskirts of the city. As a result, Fog learns of Tico's presence in his party.
4	"The Temple of Doom"	August 4, 1983
During a stopover in Suez, Transfer steals Fog's passport and lures the travellers to a ruined temple. This episode marks the first appearance of Tico's sun-clock, which features in all but one of the subsequent episodes.
5	"The Counterfeit"	August 5, 1983
While sailing to India, Fog and his party meet Brigadier Corn, who is on his way to rejoin his regiment in Benares and travels with them throughout most of their adventures in India. Meanwhile, Transfer's latest scheme involves disguising himself as Fog, in order to break into the latter's cabin.
6	"Bombay Adventure"	August 6, 1983
His previous attempt to pose as Fog is foiled, and Transfer tries again when the travellers arrive in Bombay, but his disguise is so convincing that Dix and Bully arrest him, thinking he is the real Fog. Meanwhile, Tico and Rigodon's curiosity lands them in trouble with a local religious order.
7	"The End of the Line"	August 7, 1983
Fog and his party learn that the railway linking Bombay and Calcutta is still under construction, forcing them to trek through the jungle to Allahabad. Transfer quickly takes advantage of the situation and, posing as a local guide, starts leading Fog and his party into the jungle on a stolen elephant.
8	"The Deadly Jungle"	August 8, 1983
Transfer tries to leave Fog and his party (whom he has been leading in the wrong direction) stranded in the jungle, only to be thwarted by the elephant he stole.
9	"The Remarkable Rescue of Romy"	August 9, 1983
The travellers encounter the beautiful Princess Romy, who is due to be burned on her late husband's funeral pyre. Fog is determined to save her, but, in order to do so, he and the others must risk being captured and killed themselves.
10	"A Present for Parsi"	August 10, 1983
The travellers escape from the jungle and cross paths with the elephant's rightful owner, who agrees to take them to Allahabad. Meanwhile, Romy recovers from her ordeal and, fearing she will be hunted down if she stays in India, agrees to leave the country with Fog and his party.
11	"Rigodon's Derby"	August 11, 1983
Shortly after arriving in Calcutta, Rigodon and Tico are arrested and charged with desecrating the temple they were chased out of in Bombay. Fog must now do everything in his power to free them before the Rangoon, the ship which will take the travellers on the next leg of their journey, sets sail.
12	"Storm in the China sea"	August 12, 1983
Romy is searching for the uncle and aunt she has not seen for several years and traces them to Hong Kong, but while she and the others are sailing there, they find themselves in the path of a typhoon.
13	"Rigodon swallows the Bait"	August 13, 1983
Learning that her uncle and aunt have died, a grief-stricken Romy agrees to travel to England with Fog and his party. Meanwhile, since Hong Kong is the last outpost of the British Empire Fog will pass through before returning to England, Dix is determined to detain him as long as possible and tries to enlist Rigodon's help to do so. Transfer however disguises himself as Dix to further complicate matters.
14	"Yokohama Bound"	August 14, 1983
Drugged by Transfer, Rigodon and Tico awaken to find themselves on the steamship Carnatic, at the mercy of the master of disguise, who is impersonating the ship's stoker. Meanwhile, left behind in Hong Kong, Fog and Romy search for another ship to take them to Japan, in addition to searching for their missing companions.
15	"Akita's Circus"	August 15, 1983
Finding themselves stranded in Yokohama, Rigodon and Tico seek work in a local circus to raise the money they need to get home, while Fog and Romy (who have also arrived in Japan) continue to search for them.
16	"Holiday on Hawai"	August 16, 1983
Fog and his party are sailing across the Pacific for San Francisco on the steamship General Grant. When they are forced to make an unscheduled stop in Hawaii, the travellers learn that an island princess is dangerously ill. Romy volunteers to try to save the princess, but the travellers will all be killed if her attempts fail.
17	"Vollage Balloon"	August 17, 1983
Transfer sets fire to the General Grant's sails, forcing the ship to dock in Mexico while repairs are carried out. Shortly afterwards, a hot-air balloon crashes into the ship and Fog (who must cover more than 400 miles in one day) buys it from the pilot. As the travellers prepare to take off, Dix (who has a plan to gain Fog's confidence) and Bully hitch a ride.
18	"On the Pacific Railway"	August 18, 1983
Arriving in San Francisco, the travellers experience their first taste of life in the Wild West, while Transfer enlists the help of the Dingo Kid and his gang of outlaws to lure Fog into a fight.
19	"The Stampede"	August 19, 1983
As Fog and the others travel across United States by train, Transfer attempts to use the wild terrain against them. When he sabotages the bridge across Medicine Bow Gorge, Fog is forced to take a desperate gamble by attempting to direct the train across the bridge at maximum speed.
20	"A Risky Decision"	August 20, 1983
The train is attacked by American Indians, but Fog, Rigodon, Dix and Bully manage to drive them off. Shortly afterwards, however, Transfer (disguised as one of the Indians) attacks the train's driver and stoker, sending the train careering out of control. Rigodon and Tico, sent to investigate, end up being captured by Indians and, though the train is eventually brought back under control, Fog is not prepared to continue travelling without them.
21	"A Very Special Train"	August 21, 1983
The travellers are reunited and must now travel across over 100 miles of rough terrain to reach Omaha. Transfer leads a gang of outlaws in an ambush on a stage-coach whose driver has found the travellers on the prairie and agreed to take them to their destination.
22	"The Return of Rigodon"	August 22, 1983
With the railway system linking Chicago and Buffalo closed due to heavy snow, Fog and the others plan to cross the Great Lakes in an ice-boat. During the trip, Tico is taken ill, forcing the travellers to seek shelter in a log cabin until he has recovered.
23	"Destination New York"	August 23, 1983
Having just missed the ship in which they had planned to sail home, the travellers book passage on the Henrietta, a cargo ship bound for Bordeaux, even though, by not sailing directly to England, they risk missing their deadline. When the ship's captain, Andrew Speedy, falls victim to one of Transfer's traps and needs medical attention, he orders Fog to head for the nearest port. As luck would have, the nearest port is Liverpool, Fog's intended destination.
24	"Mutiny on the Henrietta"	August 24, 1983
When the Henrietta's coal supply is exhausted fighting a hurricane, Fog buys the ship, intending to use the wood on board as fuel. By the end of the episode, nothing remains of the ship except a metal framework.
25	"The Arrest of Willy Fog"	August 25, 1983
On arriving in Liverpool, Dix tells Fog he is under arrest. Though Fog is soon freed (since the real bank-robber is already in custody) he and the others have only a few hours to reach London and the only train available is a freight train. To complicate matters, the group has one final encounter with Transfer who is determined to stop Fog once and for all.
26	"The Final Decision"	August 26, 1983
Fog has narrowly lost the bet and, with it, most of what remains of his fortune after all the expenses incurred on the trip. Romy then asks him to marry her; Fog accepts and, while Rigodon and Tico are taking care of the arrangements, they learn that, having failed to account for crossing the International Date Line, they believe it to be a day later than it actually is. There follows a race against time to reach the Reform Club before the deadline actually expires.

== Willy Fog 2 ==
The second series was produced in 1993 by BRB Internacional and Televisión Española with animation by Wang Film Productions and was again based on the work of Jules Verne, this time split between Journey to the Centre of the Earth and Twenty Thousand Leagues Under the Seas. Again, aside from the introduction of additional characters—significantly more so than in the adaptation of Around the World in 80 Days since neither Fog nor any of his friends are in Verne's books—the series followed the novel quite faithfully. It was narrated by Rigodon, who summarized both the previous and upcoming episodes at the start and end of each new edition. The opening theme song re-used the music from Around the World with Willy Fog with new words detailing the cast's journey's to the 'Centre of the Earth' and the 'Bottom of the Sea', while the closing credits used a different song to the first series, "Romy". It was first broadcast on La 2.

=== Willy Fog in Journey to the Centre of the Earth ===
No.	Title	Original release date
1	"The Coded Message"	September 24, 1994
After a recap of their journey around the world in 80 days, Lord Guinness introduces Willy Fog to Professor Lidenbrock, who believes it is possible to travel to the Centre of the Earth. Fog and Lidenbrock decode a note written by Icelander Arne Saknussemm detailing his own journey, and the pair decide to follow in his footsteps. The disbelieving Sullivan—now running a Betting Shop, having been sacked at the end of the previous series—refuses to believe it possible and bets another 20,000 pounds that Fog will fail. The villainous Transfer reappears and offers to help stop them, again.
2	"Off to Iceland"	October 1, 1994
Fog, Lidenbrock and Rigodon set off for Iceland, but forget their train tickets; Romy and Tico arrive at the last minute with the tickets, and accompany them to Iceland intending to stay there and wait for Fog's return from the Centre of the Earth.
3	"A Silent Guide"	October 2, 1994
Fog hires Hans to guide them on their journey, but Transfer takes his place intent on sabotaging the trip.
4	"The Sleeping Volcano"	October 8, 1994
5	"Romy in Danger"	October 9, 1994
6	"Towards the Centre of the Earth"	October 15, 1994
7	"Transfer's Revenge"	October 16, 1994
Episode title: AKA "Transfer's Vengeance"
8	"The Unexpected River"	October 22, 1994
9	"Lost in Darkness"	October 23, 1994
Episode title: AKA "Lost in the Dark"
10	"The Underground Sea"	October 29, 1994
Hans and Rigodon continue to search for Romy and Tico. After a fruitless search, Hans accidentally finds an underground sea and interconnected series of tunnels/slides linking the cavern system. Reunited again, the group encounter a prehistoric monster, and Professor Lidenbrock blunders into some quicksand.
11	"The Battle of the Monsters"	October 30, 1994
12	"The Storm"	November 5, 1994
13	"The Trip Back"	November 6, 1994

=== Willy Fog in 20,000 Leagues Under the Sea ===
No.	Title	Original release date
14	"Some Inexplicable Events"	November 12, 1994
15	"Professor Aronnax"	November 13, 1994
Episode title: "Professor Aronnax"
16	"Ned Land, the Harpooner"	November 19, 1994
17	"On the High Seas"	November 20, 1994
18	"The Monster of the Depths"	November 26, 1994
19	"Captain Nemo"	November 27, 1994
20	"Visiting the Nautilus"	December 3, 1994
Episode title: AKA "Prisoners of the Nautilus"
21	"An Underwater Walk"	December 4, 1994
22	"On Terra Firma"	TBA
23	"The Pearl Divers"	December 18, 1994
24	"At the South Pole"	January 7, 1995
25	"Fighting with the Octopus"	January 8, 1995
26	"Saved From the Whirlwind"	TBA
