= Ruy, the Little Cid =

Animated television series

- Spanish: Ruy, el pequeño Cid
- Genre: Animation
- Created by: Claudio Biern Boyd
- Written by: Toshiyuki Kushikura; Joaquim Amichartis (Spanish adaptation)
- Directed by: Fumio Kurokawa
- Voices of: Naoko Watanabe; Ana Ángeles García (Spanish)
- Narrated by: Claudio Rodriguez
- Country of origin: Spain
- Original language: Spanish
- No. of seasons: 1
- No. of episodes: 26

Production
- Producer: Junzo Nakajima
- Running time: 23 minutes
- Production companies: BRB Internacional; Televisión Española

Original release
- Network: TVE1
- Release: 10 September – 3 December 1980

Ruy, the Little Cid is an animated adventure series produced by Spanish studio BRB Internacional and Televisión Española with animation by Japanese studio Nippon Animation. The series is based upon the life of El Cid, an 11th-century Spanish hero and was the first original project from Claudio Biern Boyd.

== Synopsis ==
The story is about the imaginary adventures of the childhood of El Cid in the Kingdom of Castile during the 11th century. At the beginning of each chapter there was a historical introduction of the moment: King Fernando I, always engaged in warfare against the rest of the peninsular kingdoms, had unified the Kingdom of Castile with that of León, something that was not accepted willingly by all the Leonese nobles. Meanwhile, little Rodrigo (Rodrigo Díaz de Vivar or El Cid) dreams of being a brave knight.

== Spanish cast ==
- Claudio Rodriguez as Narrator
- Ana Ángeles García as Ruy
- Matilde Vilariño as Jimena
- Teófilo Martínez as Fray Amadeo

== Japanese cast ==
- Naoko Watanabe as Ruy
- Akiko Tsuboi as Teresa
- Kinpei Azusa as King Fernando

== Episode list ==
No.	Title	Original release date
1	Transliteration: "In a town called Vivar" (Spanish: En un pueblo llamado Vivar)	10 September 1980
2	Transliteration: "Ruy, I am your father" (Spanish: Ruy, yo soy tu padre)	TBA
3	Transliteration: "Ruy at the monastery" (Spanish: Ruy en el monasterio)	TBA
4	Transliteration: "An ass in the chapel" (Spanish: Un asno en la capilla)	TBA
5	Transliteration: "Ruy imprisoned" (Spanish: El encierro de Ruy)	TBA
6	Transliteration: "Ruy, the gang's boss" (Spanish: Ruy, el jefe de la pandilla)	TBA
7	Transliteration: "Giant's tower" (Spanish: El torreón del gigante)	TBA
8	Transliteration: "Ruy is flying" (Spanish: El vuelo de Ruy)	TBA
9	Transliteration: "The silver horseshoe" (Spanish: La herradura de plata)	TBA
10	Transliteration: "Ruy and the three vagabonds" (Spanish: Ruy y los tres vagabundos)	TBA
11	Transliteration: "The castle under siege" (Spanish: El castillo sitiado)	TBA
12	Transliteration: "The knight made out of brass" (Spanish: El caballero de latón)	TBA
13	Transliteration: "Florinda's kidnapping" (Spanish: El rapto de Florinda)	TBA
14	Transliteration: "A night in the graveyard" (Spanish: Una noche en el cementerio)	TBA
15	Transliteration: "The mad hero" (Spanish: El loco justiciero)	TBA
16	Transliteration: "Ruy gets Peca back" (Spanish: Ruy recupera a Peca)	TBA
17	Transliteration: "The banner" (Spanish: El estandarte)	TBA
18	Transliteration: "Doña Berenguela's ghost" (Spanish: El fantasma de doña Berenguela)	TBA
19	Transliteration: "A castle for Martin" (Spanish: Un castillo para Martín)	TBA
20	Transliteration: "Pancorbo's bells" (Spanish: Las campanas de Pancorbo)	TBA
21	Transliteration: "Mountain men" (Spanish: Los montañeses)	TBA
22	Transliteration: "The pilgrim's bridge" (Spanish: El puente de los peregrinos)	TBA
23	Transliteration: "The conspiracy" (Spanish: La conspiración)	TBA
24	Transliteration: "A deadly arrow" (Spanish: Una flecha mortal)	TBA
25	Transliteration: "The King is in danger" (Spanish: El rey en peligro)	TBA
26	Transliteration: "Ruy, the Cid" (Spanish: Ruy, el Cid campeador)	TBA
