= Willy Fog 2 =

Children's animated television series produced by BRB Internacional

- Genre: Adventure
- Based on: Journey to the Center of the Earth and Twenty Thousand Leagues Under the Seas by Jules Verne
- Developed by: Claudio Biern Boyd
- Directed by: Wang Yaquan
- Theme music composer: Guido and Maurizio De Angelis
- Opening theme: "Around the World with Willy Fog" by Mocedades
- Ending theme: "Romy" by Mocedades
- Country of origin: Spain
- Original language: Spanish
- No. of episodes: 26 (list of episodes)

Production
- Running time: 30 mins
- Production companies: BRB Internacional; Televisión Española

Original release
- Network: La 2
- Release: 24 September 1994 – January 1995

Related
- Around the World with Willy Fog (1983)

Willy Fog 2 is a Spanish animated television adaptation of the novels Journey to the Center of the Earth and Twenty Thousand Leagues Under the Seas by Jules Verne, with the characters from Around the World with Willy Fog, produced by Spanish studio BRB Internacional and Televisión Española that was first broadcast on La 2 between 24 September 1994 and January 1995.

== Background ==
Due to the success of Around the World with Willy Fog, BRB Internacional and Televisión Española revisited the franchise ten years later and, with animation by Wang Film Productions in Taiwan, released a sequel series simply titled Willy Fog 2. The series ran to 26 episodes and consisted of two separate serialized stories that were based on the original novels.

The first was Journey to the Center of the Earth, which plays out similarly to the first series. In the story, Sullivan calls the bet again and sends Transfer to cause havoc. This time, however, more people believe in Willy Fog, although all of them (apart from Lord Guinness) turn against him at times, they are with him again when reports reveal that the volcano he travelled to is about to erupt. Romy, Tico and Rigodon go with Willy on the voyage again and are joined by Professor Lidenbrock – an expert in archaeology and Hans – an Icelandic who acts as a general dogsbody. The team manages to get the bet on time again.

The second story was adapted from Twenty Thousand Leagues Under the Seas, and is completely different from the other two. Willy is called to help investigate strange events as several ships are attacked by what seems to be a sea monster. Willy, Romy, Rigodon and Tico go to solve the case, but their ship is invaded and they, alongside Ned the harpoonist and Professor Aronnax, are kidnapped by the mysterious Captain Nemo. After having adventures under the sea, they finally escape.

As production occurred in Taiwan and China, the Japanese studio that made the first series, Nippon Animation, was not involved in Willy Fog 2, as is clearly evidenced in its much flatter, brighter, less-nuanced animation. The series re-used the De Angelis's opening theme, with new lyrics to reflect the change of premise, and employed the lyrical version of "Romy" as a closing theme. The series was dubbed into English by the London-based company Village Productions, Ltd, which had worked on dubs of several other contemporary BRB shows, such as The Untouchables of Elliot Mouse. Although the voice cast was entirely new, the group clearly drew upon the Intersound dub of the original series as a source upon which to base the character voices.

== Home entertainment releases ==
In 1995, BRB Internacional released three Willy Fog films – Around the World in 80 Days, Journey to the Center of the Earth and 20,000 Leagues Under the Sea – each one created by heavily editing the first series from roughly 650 minutes in total down to a truncated 75 minutes apiece. All three films were dubbed by Village Productions, who had previously dubbed the second series for the United Kingdom, and later reached the United States on DVD. Notably, the Village Productions dub for the first film was able to secure use of Intersound's English-language version of the theme tune.

=== Finnish ===
Songs in the Finnish dub were sung by the actors of YLE Import re-using the De Angelis's music but with new Finnish lyrics. In the Finnish dub some scenes are cut, which includes musical numbers in some episodes.

=== English ===
Around 2016, the English dubs of all episodes of the series were uploaded to the official channel of BRB Internacional on YouTube.

== See also ==
- List of underwater science fiction works
