= Filly (toy) =

Hong Kong toy franchise

- Invented by: Jacob and Henrik Andersen
- Company: Dracco Company
- Country: Hong Kong
- Availability: 2006–present

Filly is a Hong Kong–based toy franchise developed by Dracco Company. The franchise was founded by Jacob and Henrik Andersen, The target group is primarily girls aged around four to seven years.

Despite rumors, Filly has never been the topic of copyright infringement of Simba and Hasbro (instead, it were other horse toys produced by Simba).

A 2011 study found that Filly figures had a higher content of harmful substances. A 2013 study found figures that contained cadmium.

== History ==
Before creating Filly, the Hong Kong–based toy company Dracco had already developed other types of collectible and play figures (such as Predasaurs and Dracco Heads). The company was founded in 1997 by Danish brothers Jacob and Henrik Ranis Stokholm Andersen. In 2000, the company moved its headquarters from Denmark to Hong Kong, primarily because of its proximity to the preferred production facilities for toys in Asia, especially in China.

In 2006, the company created Filly, and at the time the Mexican illustrator hired by the Andersens, Carlos Ignacio del Alto Vargas, created and designed the looks of the fillies according to what the Andersens had in mind. Tine S. Norbøll also helped to develop the brand. The company has worked with Simba Dickie Group from the beginning, and Simba initially handled marketing for the Filly brand, an arrangement that lasted until January 2014. Dracco designed the first Fillys as simple collectible play figures. In the following years, the concept was expanded over several series with one topic per each. An extensive merchandising system was also set up based on the figures.

In Germany, the franchise was highly popular. More than 20 million Fillys were sold from 2007 to 2011, including more than 6 million in 2010, and 8 million in 2011. By 2012, the number of Fillys sold had increased to over 25 million, and by mid-2013 there were already around 60 million sold worldwide.

In early January 2014, Simba broke their licensing agreement with Dracco. The deal between Universal Trends and Dracco also came to an end on October 1, 2014, and toy distribution would then be handled by Dracco Deutschland GmbH. In early 2015, Tine quit working with Dracco. On July 4, 2017, Dracco secured a lasting deal with Goliath Toys. On March 11, 2019, an animated TV series based on the Filly brand, Filly Funtasia, would air after being years in development.

Starting 2020 onwards, toys and a vast line of various merchandise based on the TV series appeared in China.

In 2023, 2024 and 2026, Filly Butterfly were revamped and its new toys and characters became available for Ukraine, as well as Serbia, Slovenia, Australia and a few other countries.

== Description ==
Fillys are horse or pony-like animals mostly in colors aimed at little girls (pinks, pastel shades), that have big heads, big eyes, and round shapes. The equine creatures are mixed with different, partly horse-like figures from legends and mythology such as unicorns, pegasi, or seahorses. Every figure and toyline has a characteristic appearance with colors, accessories, held objects, hairstyles, and posture. With each toyline, there is one (with the exception of the Witchy toyline, where there are two) particularly strikingly designed "princess" with a reduced edition.

A background story is provided for each toyline and figure, in which the places of residence, professions, hobbies, and other preferences and characteristics of the Fillys, as well as the friendship and family relationships, are shown.

Contrary to what the meaning of the term "filly", a young female horse, suggests, there are not only female-coded, but also male-coded Fillys, as it is the name of the species.

Fillys are made of hard plastic. Its surface is in most cases flocked (excluding DIY sets and various other figurines) and therefore feels velvety soft. The figures are available in two sizes; the original size is approximately 5 cm, and the "baby" size, which is about half the size (2.5 cm). Smaller figures still exist, but they were not produced as a regular toyline, but only as accessories (such as chains and key rings).

The normal figures are sold in opaque, sealed plastic bags ("Blind Pack"), so that the buyer cannot see which figure they are buying before buying (except toys sold with Filly magazine, with characters names written on the bag), which increases the attraction of collecting. In many toylines there are some figures with a reduced edition, which stand out due to special features (such as special color) and are particularly popular as collector's items.

== Toylines ==
Many toylines were created for the Filly brand.

- Filly Forest (2007): First toyline. Would simply be referred to as "Filly" at the time. The line was based on various real life horse breeds.
- Filly Beach Party!! (2008): Considered non-canon.
- Filly Princess (December 2008): This toyline was the first to reach widespread popularity, and the Filly brand itself would often be referred to as "Filly Princess".
- Filly Fairy (December 2009): The line where the filly Will comes from.
- Filly Unicorn (February 2011): Considered the start of the modern Filly canon, as it established all the classic elements of the brand. This is the toyline where Rose, the main character of Filly Funtasia, and Princess Sparkle comes from.
- Filly Elves (February 2012): This toyline features Bella.
- Filly Mermaid (June 2012): The first standalone toyline that can be considered a spin-off.
- Filly Witchy (February 2013): The toyline that Lynn, the final member of the Filly Five, comes from.
- Filly Butterfly (February 2014): Notably the first toyline where Simba's logo isn't seen in the packaging, due to their break up with Dracco. This toyline would late be revamped in 2023 and 2024, include new characters (designed as recolours of previously existing fillys) and sold in Europe.
- Filly Wedding (2014): Another spin-off toyline.
- Filly Stars (February 2015): The last toyline to be designed and written by Tine. Features Zack from the Filly Funtasia series.
- Filly Royale (February 2016): An updated version of the Filly Princess toyline.
- Filly Ballerinas (August 2017)
- Filly Angels (June 2018)
- Filly Funtasia (2020 onwards, China only): Toyline based on the TV series. Notably, its toys are mostly not flocked, excluding variants shown at toy fairs and one toy set with Rose by JiaJiale.

== Media ==
In addition to the collectible and play figures (from 2007 in two sizes) with associated collectable cards, Fillys appeared in various other products and media.

=== Games ===
Computer games and apps were created for the Filly brand. Two mobile apps were released in early 2014 called "Filly Cupcake Shop" and "Filly Photo Fun". They would be followed by Filly Witchy Adventure later during the year, along with many slide puzzle apps in early 2016. On January 5, 2018, Filly Witchy Adventure disappeared from Google Play, and Dracco would later delete their other apps over the year and close their account.

"Filly Photo Fun - Butterfly", "Filly Witchy Adventures", and "Filly Star Stylist" are some of the other app games that existed to promote the brand.

=== Magazines ===
Magazines for the Filly brand were produced in German by Blue Ocean Entertainment. There are many variants:

- Filly-Magazin (Filly Magazine): The main magazine, mostly covering the most recent toyline. Every release in 2014 had a butterfly filly on the front page, for example. Published monthly since 2009 and until December 2021.
- Filly Season: Covered specific themes and seasons, such as Christmas.
- Filly Traumhochzeit (Filly Dream Wedding): Covered Filly Wedding with particular focus on romantic things and on unusual ways to have wedding-related fun. Was published roughly twice a year.
- Filly Mermaids: Covered the titular brand. Used to be published in the summer months, with one edition each for June, July and August.
- Filly Sammelband (Filly Anthology): The self-proclaimed fan guide to the Filly characters, featuring extended bios for all regular-release Fillys that was released in the past year, and a select few special characters. Published annually since 2012 and until 2018, excluding Angels and Ballerina (latter only got information about them in the magazine and on flyers of toys).
- Filly SilberStars (Filly SilverStars): A celebration of all things silver. Used to be published annually since 2012.
- Filly Extra, also known as Filly Playset-Edition: Each edition covered a building with a household. Was published every two months in 2013.
- Filly Star Stylist: As it has a fashion theme, its tasks and activities revolve around design, coloring, and clothes. Was tied to the smartphone app with the same name is likely but not guaranteed. Used to be published quarterly.

Magazines for the brand also existed in Russian, Czech, Norwegian, Greek and some other languages. Most of them stopped being produced by 2019, with last Russian issues sold in early 2019.

German magazine would remain until late 2021, with Blue Ocean Entertainment losing license to Filly for Dracco's decision to move to Egmont Ehapa Media in 2022. Egmont's magazine is mostly based on Filly Butterfly and also includes excerpts from the TV series.

=== TV series ===
On October 12, 2012, it was announced that a TV series based on the Filly franchise had begun production, with a 2014 release date. It was announced again on May 29, 2013, revealing the writers of the series with the title "Filly Funtasia". The series was originally produced by Dracco Brands, BRB Internacional/Screen 21, and Black Dragon. The show went through leaps of development hell due to financial problems with Dracco and the production company shifts, but it eventually premiered in 2019.

Another batch of season 1 was released on Christmas 2020 in China, and soon worldwide.

Season 2 and a theatrical movie are being made currently; although the creators promised to release them in 2024, it didn't happen and the series is on an indefinite hiatus currently.

=== Other media ===
The Filly franchise also comes with various toy accessories, such as stables, carriages, houses, and castles. Clothing, bed linen, soft toys, advent calendars, school bags, stickers, and crayons were also sold.

Coloring books, puzzles, handicrafts, and reading books were produced by Friendz-Verlag, and sold over 1 million sold by autumn 2012. Radio plays were produced by Europa, and over 650,000 were sold from 2011 to early 2013. Later, Dracco would partner with Universal Music to create stories based on later toylines of Filly; they were made until 2018.

"Filly Fairy: Hören & Malen" is a combined audio book and painting activity book that was distributed on a CD in 2012 and released in Germany only.

== Lawsuits ==
On May 30, 2007, the toy company Hasbro sued Simba Dickie Group for infringing on their My Little Pony "G3" designs for "Little Fairy Pony", "My Sweet Pony", "Steffi Love Evi Unicorn" and "Steffi Love Evis Fantasy Pony". On July 20, 2007, Hasbro won the lawsuit and Simba was ordered to pay a fine. Hasbro sued Simba a second time on March 30, 2010, due to the toylines "Little Fairy & Pony", "Unicorn Friends" and "Dream House", and was resolved on January 22, 2013, with Hasbro winning again. Filly wasn't mentioned in either lawsuits.

Dracco Netherlands initiated legal action against Simba in Hong Kong on February 28, 2014. Dracco alleged that instead of destroying their remaining stock of Filly toys, Simba sold it off without paying license fees and files suit against Simba to recoup them. The first lawsuit ended in a failure on March 28, 2014, but was appealed again. On October 5, 2016, Dracco won, but it was appealed again. On May 25, 2017, Dracco was successful again, but it was appealed once more. On February 7, 2018, Simba was the successful party, but the case was then appealed yet another time. The final outcome of the legal battle is still yet to be determined as of February 2020.

== Reception ==
Educators and gender researchers, similar to other characters and media tailored to girls, criticize the fact that the shape, coloring, and the representation of the Fillys and their associated stories promote outdated gender-specific role models and stereotypes. It is also criticized that children are tempted by the provider with excessive consumption through collective incentives. Many critics also find that the Fillys' artistic designs are cheesy, and uncanny.

In a test by the consumer magazine Öko-Test in 2011, in which toys from children's magazines were tested, Filly figures from the magazines Filly Magazin and Filly Special Princess received the grade "insufficient" due to the higher content of harmful ingredients. A similar study from 2013 on behalf of the Greens' parliamentary group showed residues of the heavy metal cadmium.
