= Journey to the Centre of the Earth =

1864 science fiction novel by Jules Verne

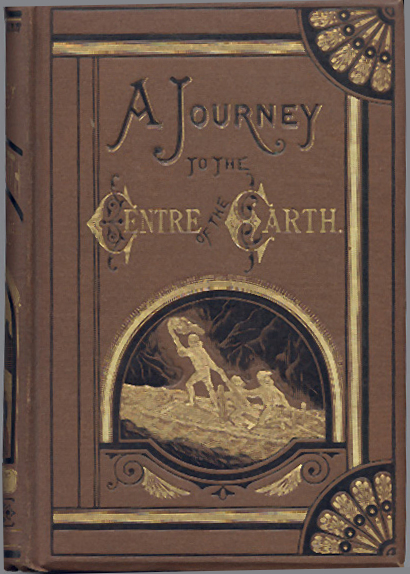
- Front cover of an 1874 English translation
- Author: Jules Verne
- Original title: Voyage au centre de la Terre
- Illustrator: Édouard Riou
- Cover artist: Édouard Riou
- Language: French
- Series: The Extraordinary Voyages #3
- Genre: Science fiction, adventure novel
- Publisher: Pierre-Jules Hetzel
- Publication date: 25 November 1864; rev. 1867
- Publication place: France
- English publication date: 1871
- Preceded by: The Adventures of Captain Hatteras
- Followed by: From the Earth to the Moon

Journey to the Centre of the Earth (French: Voyage au centre de la Terre), also translated with the variant titles A Journey to the Center of the Earth and A Journey into the Interior of the Earth, is a classic science fiction novel written by French novelist Jules Verne. It was first published in French in 1864, then reissued in 1867 in a revised and expanded edition. Professor Otto Lidenbrock is the tale's central figure, an eccentric German scientist who decodes a message from a 16th century Icelandic alchemist who claims to have reached to the very centre of the earth via volcanic tubes in the crater of the celebrated inactive Icelandic volcano Snæfellsjökull. Lidenbrock, his nephew Axel, and their Icelandic guide Hans rappel into the volcano, then contend with many dangers, including cave-ins, subpolar tornadoes, an underground ocean, and a variety of prehistoric life (the 1867 edition inserted additional prehistoric material). Eventually the three explorers are spewed back to the surface by the eruption of an active volcano, Stromboli, located in southern Italy.

The category of subterranean fiction existed well before Verne. However, his novel's distinction lay in its well-researched Victorian science and its inventive contribution to the science-fiction subgenre of time travel—Verne's innovation was the concept of a prehistoric realm still existing in the present-day world. Journey inspired many later authors, including Sir Arthur Conan Doyle in his novel The Lost World, Edgar Rice Burroughs in his Pellucidar series, and J. R. R. Tolkien in The Hobbit.

== Plot ==
The story begins in May 1863, at the home of Otto Lidenbrock, a professor of geology in Hamburg, Germany. While leafing through an original runic manuscript of an Icelandic saga, Lidenbrock and his nephew Axel find a coded note written in runic script along with the name of a 16th-century Icelandic alchemist, Arne Saknussemm. When translated into English, the note reads:

Descend into the crater of Snaefells Jökull, which Scartaris's shadow caresses just before the calends of July, O daring traveler, and you will reach the center of the earth. I have done so. Arne Saknussemm

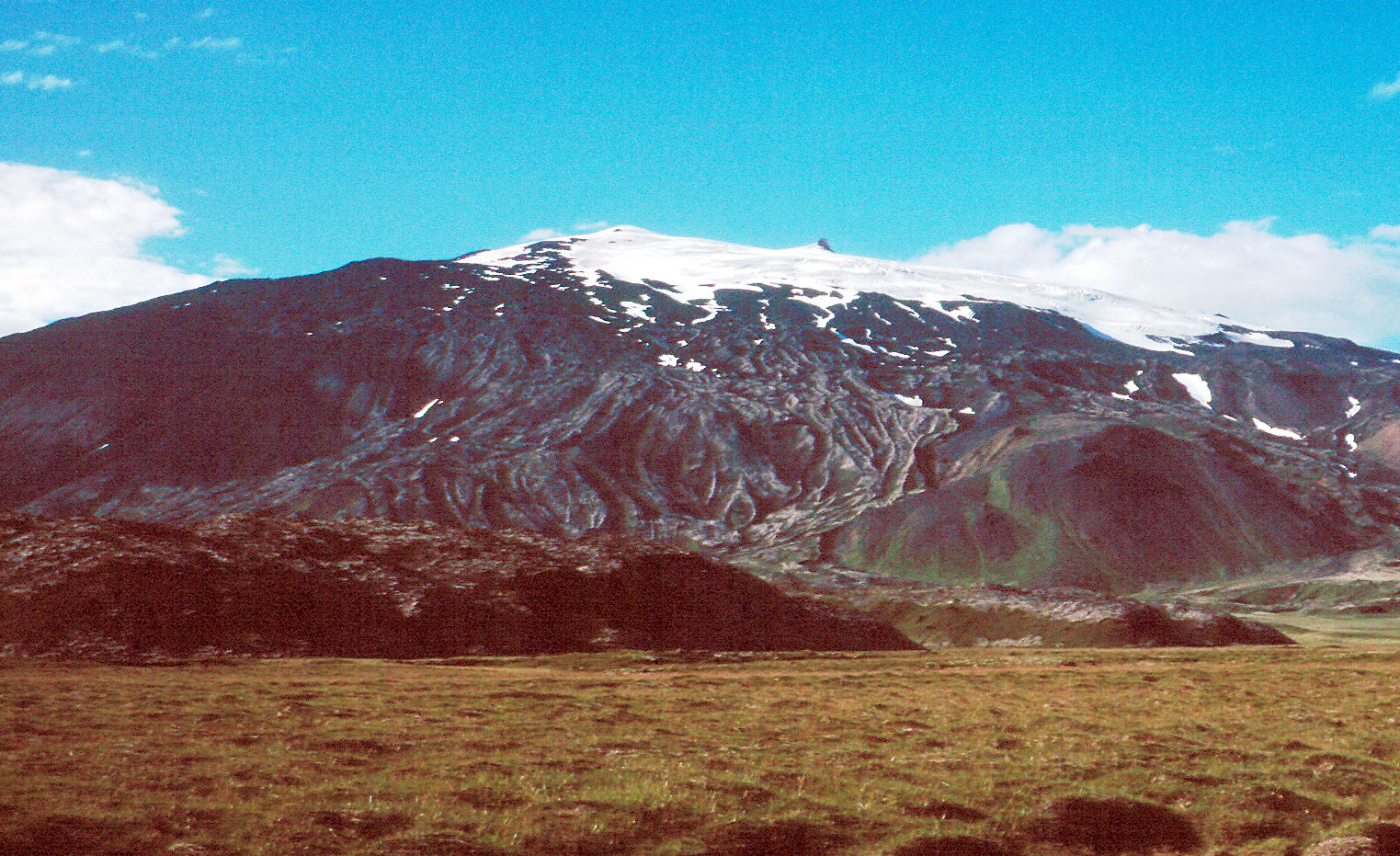
Snæfellsjökull

Lidenbrock departs for Iceland immediately, taking the reluctant Axel with him. After a swift trip via Kiel and Copenhagen, they arrive in Reykjavík. There they hire as their guide Icelander Hans Bjelke, a Danish-speaking eiderduck hunter, then travel overland to the base of Snæfellsjökull.

In late June they reach the volcano and set off into the bowels of the earth, encountering many dangers and strange phenomena. After taking a wrong turn, they run short of water and Axel nearly perishes, but Hans saves them all by tapping into a subterranean river, which shoots out a stream of water that Lidenbrock and Axel name the "Hansbach" in the guide's honor. During this descent, Axel once again comes close to death as he diverges from Lidenbrock and Hans and suffers major injuries finding his way back, however he manages to do so and is saved by them.

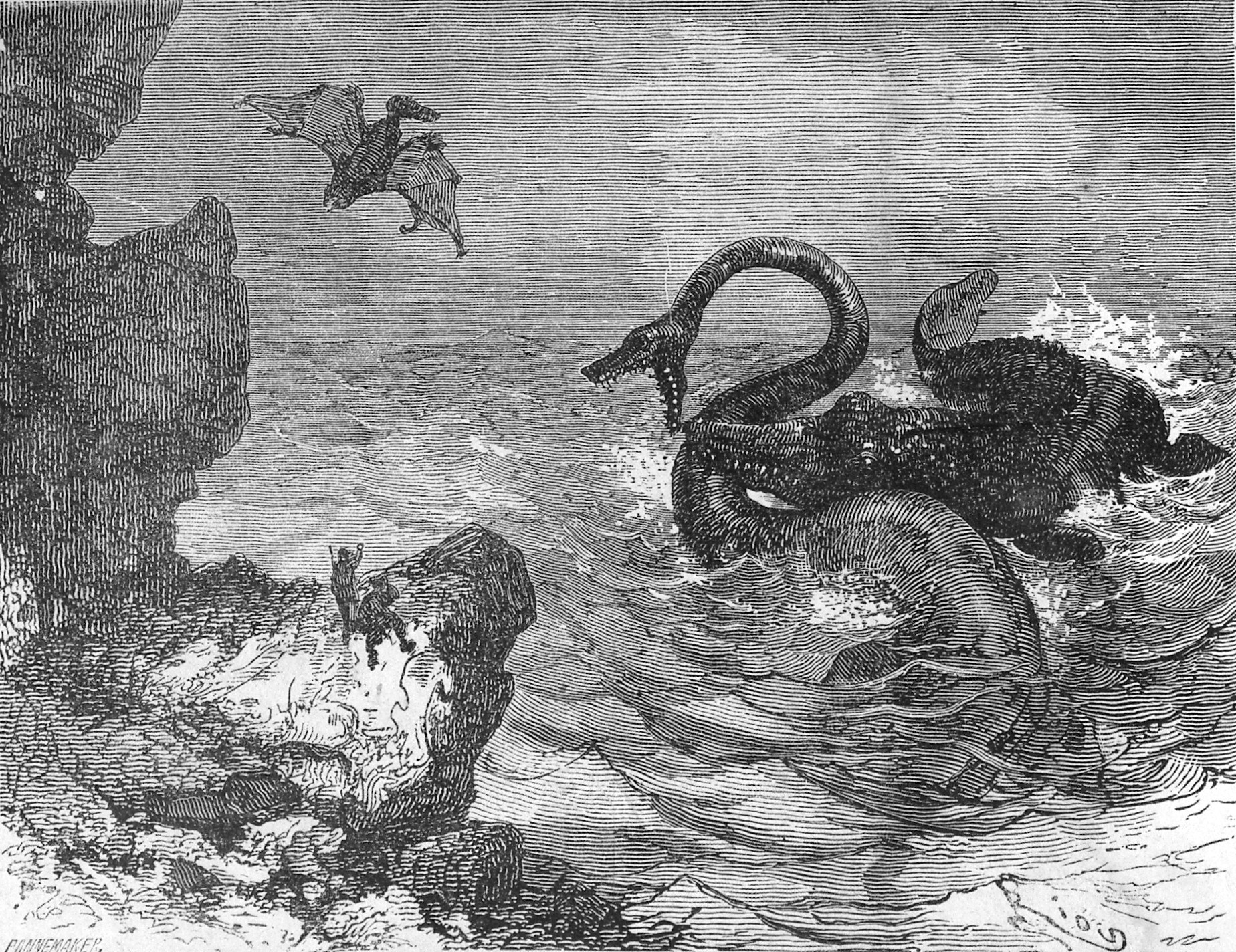
Édouard Riou's illustration of an Ichthyosaurus battling a Plesiosaurus.

Following the course of the Hansbach, the explorers descend many miles and reach an underground world lit by aurora borealis-like electric light, with forests consisting of giant mushrooms, tree ferns and trees including various modern trees like oak, as well as prehistoric ones like arborescent lycophytes (Sigillaria, Lepidodendron). The travelers then build a raft out of semipetrified wood and set sail over what turns out to be a vast underground sea. While at sea, they encounter prehistoric cephalaspid fish and giant marine reptiles from the age of dinosaurs (a Plesiosaurus fighting an Ichthyosaurus). A lightning storm threatens to destroy the raft and its passengers, but instead throws them onto the site of an enormous fossil graveyard, including bones from various extinct creatures like Lophiodon, Anoplotherium, Megatherium, mastodon, Pliopithecus, the pterodactyl, and the preserved body of a man.

Lidenbrock and Axel venture into a forest featuring primitive vegetation from the Tertiary period. In its depths they are stunned to find a prehistoric humanoid more than twelve feet in height with a huge unshapely head mostly hidden by a mane of hair. It is watching over a herd of mastodons as a shepherd. Fearing the humanoid may be hostile, they leave the forest.

Continuing to explore the coastline, the travelers find a passageway marked by Saknussemm as the way ahead, but it has been blocked by a recent cave-in. The adventurers lay plans to blow the rock open with gun cotton, meanwhile paddling their raft out to sea to avoid the blast. On executing this scheme, they find a bottomless pit beyond the impeding rock and are swept into it as the sea rushes down the huge open gap. After spending hours descending at breakneck speed, their raft reverses direction and rises inside a volcanic chimney that ultimately spews them via an eruption into the open air. When they regain consciousness, they learn that they have been ejected from Stromboli, a volcanic island located off Sicily.

The trio returns to Germany, where they gain recognition; Professor Lidenbrock is hailed as a scientists of the day, Axel marries his sweetheart Gräuben, and Hans returns to his life in Iceland.

== Main characters ==
- Professor Otto Lidenbrock: a German "professor of philosophy, chemistry, geology, mineralogy, and many other ologies" at the Johanneum Gymnasium, described as an "old geologist, very gruff and unpleasant".
- Axel: Lidenbrock's nephew (Lidenbrock had married the sister of Axel's mother), a young student, affianced.
- Hans Bjelke: an Icelandic eiderduck hunter who is hired as their guide; resourceful and imperturbable, described as "stoical".
- Gräuben: Lidenbrock's goddaughter, with whom Axel is in love; from Vierlande (region southeast of Hamburg).
- Martha: Lidenbrock's housekeeper and cook.

== Background and science ==
In August 1859, Jules Verne visited Scotland, seeing Edinburgh, its castle and the local geological features, including the extinct volcano Arthur's Seat and Castle Rock, a volcanic plug. These would have an influence on his writing. Journey was written according to the mid-19th century scientific understandings of the time. For example, Lidenbrock’s premise for why the group do not encounter elevated temperatures even as they near the base of the Earth’s crust is based on Humphry Davy’s geochemistry (including the chemical oxidation theory of volcanic eruption) which was later disapproved. However, for an understanding of geology as well as other aspects of scientific information, Verne used Louis Figuier's then recently published 1863 scientific work La Terre avant le déluge (The World before the Deluge). Verne had also made friends with Charles Joseph Sainte-Claire Deville, a noted geologist who specialised in seismic phenomena and who had descended into Stromboli. Leonard Nimoy, in the Signet edition notes that Verne "was able to adapt nearly every important element in the story’s action from contemporary, intellectual, literary, scientific, and geographical thought". The source for the runic ciphered document of Arne Saknusseman that leads to the adventure was inspired by "The Gold-Bug" (1843) by Edgar Allan Poe and the runic description came from that in L'univers pittoresque (1845, Ambroise-Firmin Didot). The character Martha (Lidenbrock's housekeeper) was based on Mathurine Paris, a live-in maid who served the Verne household in Jules' early years. It is believed that Lidenbrock's character parodies that of Verne's father, Pierre, who was said to be multilingual, scientific and passionate. The name itself was said to have been in honour of Friedrich Lindenbrog (1573-1648), a German bibliophile. Between January and August 1864, combining these influences, Verne wrote Journey.

== Publication and editions ==
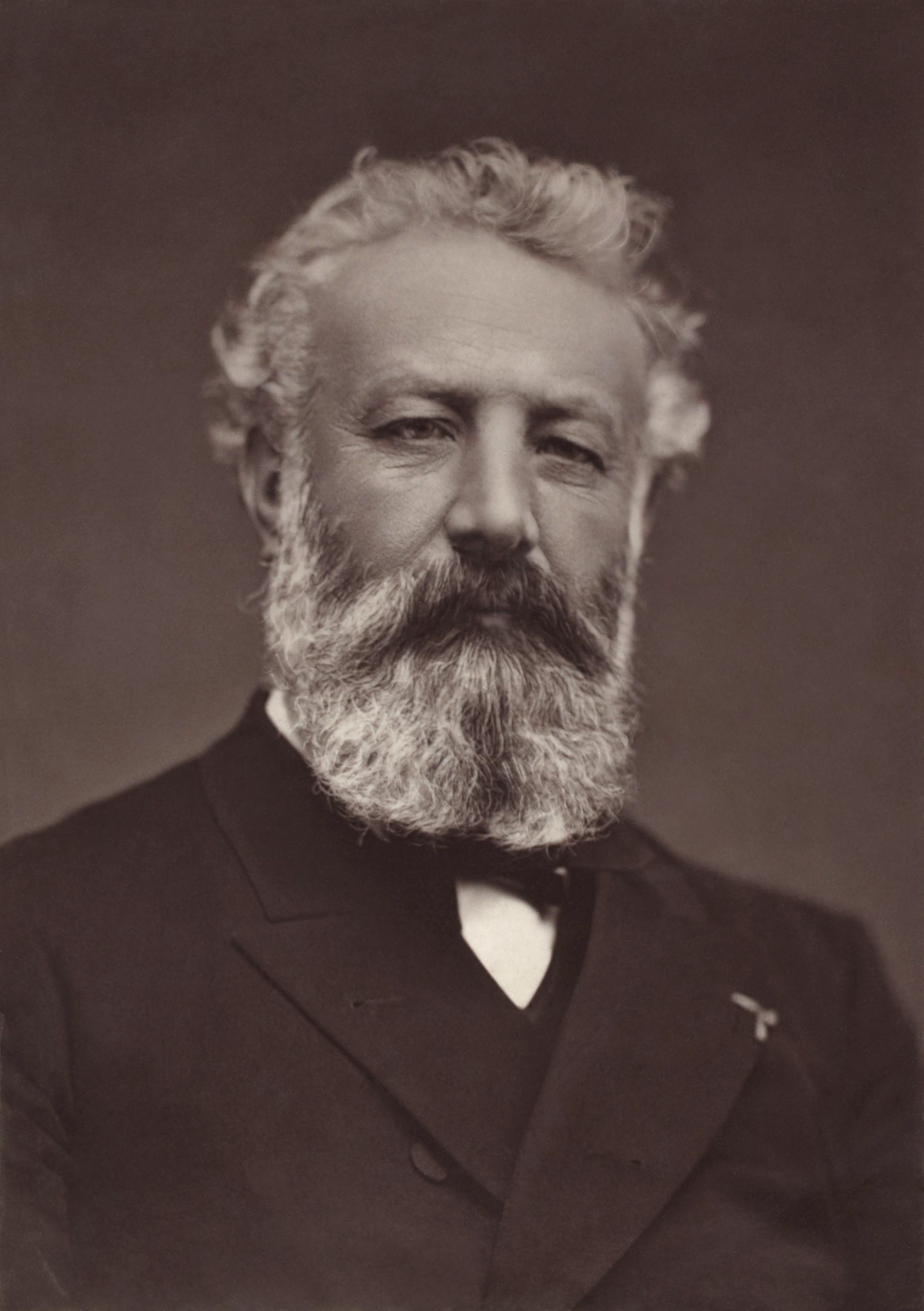
Jules Verne

The original manuscript of Journey is in a private collection in the US. The original French editions of 1864 and 1867 were issued by J. Hetzel et Cie, a major Paris publishing house owned by Pierre-Jules Hetzel. The 1867 edition, originally in a large-octavo format, came out with two new chapters. This included additional information on prehistory which had become a distinct focus of academic study in 1865. This included discussion of remains from the Quaternary Era, a living herd of mastodons, and other fictionalised prehistoric events.

For non-French readers, the work has been translated into numerous interpretations. The novel's first English edition, translated by an unknown hand and published in 1871 by the London house Griffith & Farran, appeared under the title A Journey to the Centre of the Earth and is now available at Project Gutenberg. A drastically rewritten version of the story, it adds chapter titles where Verne gives none, meanwhile changing the professor's surname to Hardwigg, Axel's name to Harry, and Gräuben's to Gretchen. In addition, many paragraphs and details are completely recomposed.

An 1877 London edition from Ward, Lock, & Co. appeared under the title A Journey into the Interior of the Earth. Its translation, credited to Frederick Amadeus Malleson, is more faithful than the Griffith & Farran version, though it, too, concocts chapter titles and modifies details. Its text is likewise available at Project Gutenberg. In 1877, Verne was sued by another author Léon Delmas alleging that Verne had plagiarised parts of Journey from the Delmas 1863 short story "La Tete de Mimers" also involving a lost runic document and exploration underground. However, when it reached court, the allegations by Delmas were not proven and Verne won the court case.

There are two modern English translations: one by Frank Wynne with notes by Peter Cogman, published by Penguin Classics in 2009, and one by Matthew Jonas, published by Birch Hill Publishing in 2022. A prior Penguin Classics edition was translated by Robert Baldick and published in 1965. A translation by Willis T Bradley, was published in the USA by Ace Books as D-155 (D-397, 2nd printing) in 1956 (1959), that claimed to be the "first new Twentieth Century translation". An Oxford World Classics paperback edition was translated by William Butcher and published in 1992.

== Adaptations ==
=== Film ===
- 1959: Journey to the Center of the Earth, USA, directed by Henry Levin, starring James Mason and Pat Boone, distributed by 20th Century Fox. The film transfers Verne's beginning locale from Hamburg to Edinburgh, "Professor Otto Lidenbrock" becomes "Professor Oliver Lindenbrook", and Axel becomes earth-sciences student Alec McEwan. The film also introduces a new subplot and two additional main characters: a female explorer (Arlene Dahl) and a villainous antagonist (Thayer David).
- 1978: Viaje al centro de la Tierra, Spain, directed by Juan Piquer Simón, starring Kenneth More and Pep Munné. It was distributed in both the U.S. in theaters as Where Time Began and the U.K. on TV as The Fabulous Journey to the Centre of the Earth.
- 2008: Journey to the Center of the Earth is a 3-D film by Eric Brevig. Cast members include Brendan Fraser, Anita Briem, and Josh Hutcherson. The film is a modern-day paraphrase of the 1860s original — it uses Verne's book as its inciting incident instead of Saknussemm's message, then follows the novel's overall structure with fidelity: a geology professor, his nephew, and an Icelandic guide (now a woman named "Hannah") penetrate Snaefells, discover a seashore with giant mushrooms, sail across an underground ocean inhabited by a pod of Elasmosaurus, a relative of the plesiosaurus, and reach the other side where they encounter a terrestrial animal from prehistory, in this case a Tyrannosaurus, a predatory theropod dinosaur rather than a mastodon. Ultimately the three explorers exit the heating underworld via an erupting volcano, find themselves in present-day Italy, and return to their starting point in academia.

=== Television ===
- An animated television series, Journey to the Center of the Earth, first broadcast in 1967 on ABC, starring the voices of Ted Knight, Pat Harrington, Jr., and Jane Webb; loosely based on Verne's novel and closer to the 1959 film.
- The first half of the animated television series Willy Fog 2 (1994–95), the sequel of Around the World with Willy Fog, produced by Spanish studio BRB Internacional and Televisión Española, is based on Journey to the Centre of the Earth. BRB Internacional heavily edited that first half of the series down to a truncated 75 minutes direct-to-video film later.
- A limited animation television special in the Famous Classic Tales series was aired by CBS in 1977.
- The Wishbone 1996 episode "Hot Diggety Dawg" followed the novel and featured several major scenes identifying the central character as Professor Lidenbrock.
- The 37th episode of The Triplets, called Journey to the Center of the Earth, makes reference to this novel.
- The 1999 Hallmark Entertainment miniseries starred Treat Williams, Jeremy London, Bryan Brown, Tushka Bergen, and Hugh Keays-Byrne. This version deviates massively from Verne's original.
- The 2001 animated television series Ultimate Book of Spells references the novel, as the main protagonists are sent on adventures through the centre of the Earth with the titular object. It was originally planned to be named after the book in general, but was changed.
- Journey to the Center of the Earth was a 2008 American-Canadian TV film from RHI Entertainment. Starring Rick Schroder, Peter Fonda, Victoria Pratt, Steven Grayhm, and Mike Dopud, it was shot in and around Vancouver during the summer of 2007.
- The 2012 episode Journey to the Center of the Earth, from Ben & Holly's Little Kingdom, makes reference to the novel. In it, the naughty twins Daisy and Poppy magically send Mrs. Fotheringill to the center of the earth, and it's up to Grandpapa Thistle to guide Ben, Holly and their family there on a rescue mission.

=== Radio and audio recordings ===
- A seven-part radio serial was broadcast on the BBC Home Service in 1962. It was produced by Claire Chovil, and starred Trevor Martin and Nigel Anthony.
- An eight-part radio serial was produced for BBC Radio 4 by Howard Jones in 1963. It starred Bernard Horsfall and Jeffrey Banks.
- Tom Baker was the reader for a recording released by Argo Records in 1977.
- Jon Pertwee was the reader for a recording released by Pinnacle Records Storyteller in 1975.
- Caedmon Records released a 1979 abridged recording of Journey to the Center of the Earth read by James Mason, in the 1960s.
- Alien Voices, an audio theater group led by Leonard Nimoy and John de Lancie, released a dramatized version of Journey to the Center of the Earth through Simon and Schuster Audio in 1997.
- A radio drama adaptation was broadcast by National Public Radio in 2000 for its series Radio Tales.
- A 90-minute radio adaptation by Stephen Walker directed by Owen O'Callan was first broadcast on BBC Radio 4 on 28 December 1995, and rebroadcast on BBC Radio 4 Extra on 20 November 2011, on 11 and 12 November 2012, and on 20 and 21 December 2014. Nicholas Le Prevost stars as Professor Otto Lidenbrock, Nathaniel Parker as Axel, and Oliver Senton as Hans. Kristen Millwood plays Rosemary McNab, a new character who funds and accompanies the expedition.
- In 2011, Audible released an unabridged "Signature Performance" reading of the book by Tim Curry.
- A two-part BBC Radio 4 adaptation of Journey to the Centre of the Earth broadcast on 19 and 26 March 2017. Featuring Stephen Critchlow as Professor Lidenbrock, Joel MacCormack as Axel, and Gudmundur Ingi Thorvaldsson as Hans, it was directed and produced by Tracey Neale and adapted by Moya O'Shea.

=== Games ===
- Video games called Journey to the Center of the Earth: in 1984 by Ozisoft for the Commodore 64; in 1989 by Topo Soft for the ZX Spectrum and in 2003 by Frogwares.
- A board game adaptation of the book designed by Rüdiger Dorn was released by Kosmos in 2008.

=== Music ===
- A concept album called Journey to the Centre of the Earth by Rick Wakeman was released in 1974. It combines song, narration and instrumental pieces to retell the story.
  - Wakeman released a second concept album called Return to the Centre of the Earth in 1999. It tells the story of a later set of travelers attempting to repeat the original journey.
- In 2024 Croatian composer Bruno Vlahek wrote a suite for piano called Journey to the Center of the Earth in five movements inspired by some of key moments from the novel. Through a palette of extended piano techniques, the suite captures the narrative arc and dramatic atmosphere of Verne’s subterranean adventure. The scenes Vlahek recreated through music are: The Shadow of Scartaris, The Mushroom Forest, Old Alchemist Song (Arne Saknussemm), Lost in the Labyrinth and A Duel of Antediluvian Monsters which exists also in a version for piano four hands as an imaginary battle between two pianists.

=== Other ===
- Classics Illustrated published Classics Illustrated 138 "Journey to the Center of the Earth" with cover and illustrations by Norman Nodel in 1957.
- The 1992 adventure/role-playing game Quest for Glory III by Sierra Entertainment used Arne Saknoosen the Aardvark as a bit character for exploration information, alluding to the explorer Arne Saknussemm.
- The DC Comics comic book series Warlord takes place in Skartaris, a land supposed to exist within a Hollow Earth. Its creator Mike Grell has confirmed that "the name comes from the mountain peak Scartaris that points the way to the passage to the Earth's core in Journey to the Center of the Earth."
- Halldór Laxness, the only Icelandic author to be awarded the Nobel Prize, set his novel Under the Glacier in the area of Snæfellsjökull. The glacier has a mystic quality in the story and there are several references to A Journey to the Center of the Earth in connection with it.

== See also ==
- Pellucidar
- Spartakus and the Sun Beneath the Sea
- Subterranean fiction

== Bibliography ==
- Butcher, William (2006). Jules Verne. New York: Da Capo Press. ISBN 1-56025-854-3.
- Debus, Allen (July 2007). "Re-Framing the Science in Jules Verne's Journey to the Center of the Earth". Science Fiction Studies. 33 (3): 405–20. JSTOR 4241461.
- Evans, Arthur B. (2005). "Jules Verne's English Translations". Science Fiction Studies. 32 (1). University of California Press: 80–104.
