= Fútbol en acción =

- Genre: Animated series
- Country of origin: Spain
- Original language: Spanish
- No. of seasons: 1
- No. of episodes: 26

Production
- Running time: 25 minutes
- Production companies: RTVE, BRB Internacional, Nippon Animation

Original release
- Network: TVE-1
- Release: 5 December 1981 – 12 June 1982

Fútbol en acción is a Spanish children's animated television series, produced by RTVE, BRB Internacional and Nippon Animation. The protagonist is Naranjito, an anthropomorphic orange and the mascot of the 1982 FIFA World Cup in Spain. The series ran for 26 episodes on TVE-1 between 5 December 1981 and 12 June 1982, the day before the World Cup began.

== Synopsis ==
The series involves Naranjito, his friend and fellow orange Clementina, the lemon Citronio and the robot Imarchi, who travel through time and to different countries encouraging fair play of football. They are opposed by the villain Zruspa and his Cocos, who encourage foul play. The series includes live-action football advice from footballer and manager Alfredo Di Stéfano, and commentary on clips from past FIFA World Cups from sports journalist Matías Prats Cañete.

== Broadcast ==
After its last episode on 12 June 1982, the show was not repeated, nor was it released on home media. On 11 June 2026, in the run-up to the 2026 FIFA World Cup, AMC-owned nostalgia channel VinTV ran a marathon of all 26 episodes, followed by one daily. The episodes were also uploaded for on-demand viewing.

The series was also dubbed into French as Onze pour une coupe and aired on FR3 from 29 March to 27 June 1982.

== Reception ==
In 2020, Spanish sports newspaper Marca named Fútbol en acción as the sixth-best animated series about football. Upon the announcement of the show's repeats in 2026, sources such as La Razón and Diario de Sevilla named it as part of Spain's sporting and pop culture.
