= Filly Funtasia =

2019 television series

- Also known as: Filly Funtasia: Magic, Spells & Fun
- Genre: Fantasy; Adventure; Comedy; Coming-of-age
- Created by: Jacob Andersen; Henrik Andersen
- Based on: Filly by Jacob and Henrik Andersen
- Developed by: Tine S. Norbøll
- Written by: Carlos Bleycher; Sean Catherine Derek; John Gatehouse; Johnny Hartmann; Jymn Magon; Expand: Steve Middleton; Armin Prediger; Dean Stefan; Laura Tey; Noelle Wright; Phil Harnage
- Directed by: Jacob Andersen (season 1); Henrik Andersen (season 1); Conan Hu (season 2)
- Opening theme: "Magical World" by Windy Wagner
- Ending theme: "From Now Until Forever" by Windy Wagner
- Composers: Giles Packham; John McPhillips; Klaus Derendorf (song producer)
- Countries of origin: Hong Kong; Spain; China
- Original language: English
- No. of seasons: 2
- No. of episodes: 26

Production
- Executive producers: Jacob Andersen; Henrik Andersen
- Producers: Zhong Lin; Haichuan Shen; Conan Hu; Liang Li; Dirk Hampel
- Running time: 24 minutes (Note: The Chinese release of the series splits every episode into two 12 to 13-minute parts.)
- Production companies: Dracco Brands (2012–19); BRB Internacional (2012–16); Studio 21 (2012–16); Black Dragon Entertainment (2012–16); Guangzhou Huamai Animation Studios (2018–20); B-Water Animation Studios (2018–20); Zhaolong Culture (2019–20)

Original release
- Network: iQiyi (Note: The first 13 episodes premiered months earlier on Frisbee in Italy.)
- Release: November 28, 2019 (Note: The series premiered worldwide in Italy on Frisbee on March 11, 2019.) – December 25, 2020

Filly Funtasia is an animated fantasy television series created by Jacob and Henrik Andersen for Dracco. The series follows filly Rose and her friends as they attend a magical academy in the royal kingdom of Funtasia. It is based on the Filly toy franchise. The series was originally produced by Dracco Brands, BRB Internacional, Screen 21, and Black Dragon Entertainment, but the latter three companies dropped out of producing the series around 2016, and the former dropped out in 2019. Guangzhou Huamai Animation Studios, B-Water Animation Studios, and Zhaolong Culture joined production much later and managed to complete what the other studios left behind.

After five years of development hell starting from 2014 when Filly Funtasia was originally supposed to premiere, the series finally premiered on March 11, 2019, on Frisbee in Italy. The series also premiered on November 28, 2019, on iQiyi in China.

The show was renewed for a second season that was released on iQiyi on December 25, 2020.

In early 2021, an earlier produced English version of the series started streaming on the KidsFlix and MyToonz apps in the United States for three episodes. On March 3, 2022, the series officially premiered with a finalized English version on Channel 5 in Singapore, with episodes being made available on their meWATCH VOD.

The owners of the franchise have repeatedly claimed that a third season would be released over the years, the latest of which being in 2025. However, there is no definitive status of its release, and it has been postponed for the time being.

== Plot ==
Filly Funtasia is about the adventures of Rose, a unicorn filly who attends the Royal Magic Academy in the kingdom of Funtasia. Her best friends – Bella, an elf filly, Lynn, a witchy filly, Will, a fairy filly, and Cedric, a royale filly, accompany her as they go to the extraordinary school to improve their magical skills, be it mixing unpredictable potions or casting spells. Rose also has to deal with everyday teenage school life while learning about the magical world around her.

Inside the basement of the academy lives Wranglum, an evil tree-like wizard creature who is trapped inside a "dark mirror", or a crystal prison. Battiwigs, a bat who is Will and Cedric's dorm pet, secretly works for Wranglum as his bumbling minion and carries his master around. Wranglum and Battiwigs plot various schemes to try and steal any crystals from the academy they can so that they can use their magic to rule over Funtasia.

== Characters ==
The main characters. From left to right: Will, Bella, Rose (in center), Cedric, Lynn, and Battiwigs (on top).

=== Main ===
- Rose (voiced by Kelly Coalson, with singing mainly provided by Windy Wagner) is the main protagonist and a caring, young unicorn who tries to be good at everything she does.
- Bella, short for Isabella is a talented elf who loves nature and finds beauty in everyone.
- Lynn is a high-spirited witch from the Witchy Kingdom (Zimsala).
- Will, short for Willow is a daring fairy who likes to play pranks, and is friends with Lynn.
- Cedric is an intelligent prince, and an inventor.
- Wranglum (voiced by David Wills) is the main villain of the series. He is a tree-like wizard creature who is trapped inside a crystal prison that takes the form of a mirror. He is determined to rule Funtasia by any means necessary.
- Battiwigs is a bat serving as both Will and Cedric's dorm pet, and undercover as Wranglum's minion.

=== Recurring ===
- Miss Sparkle is the headmistress of the academy.
- Twilight is a fairy filly. She is one of the teachers and Zack's boss.
- Zack is the top student of the academy and Twilight's intern. Rose has a crush on him.
- Fabian is a new student at the academy. He is a lover of geology, and is often clumsy.
- Bijou the owl is the dorm pet of Rose.
- Zam and Zamie are two elf twins in the academy. They are normally seen causing trouble, especially for Will.

== Production ==
Filly Funtasia was created by Danish brothers, Jacob and Henrik Ranis Stokholm Andersen, who also founded the Filly franchise around 2006, and serve as the directors of the series. Development began during the summer of 2012, and Tine S. Norbøll, the developer of the franchise, wrote the story bible for series. She was also an art director for the show, though her work is uncredited. BRB Internacional and their animation studio Studio 21 originally did the animation work, with some outsourcing from Black Dragon Entertainment in China.

A concept art of a scene in what was previously known as episode 4 (likely "The Crush") by one of BRB's staff, Stevepeig.

Some notable BRB staff who worked on the show include Stevepeig, who designed some of the concept art and how scenes would act out, and Dani Canovas, who designed some of the main characters such as Rose and Will, and did the color script for some scenes, as well as the backgrounds.

On October 12, 2012, plans for an animated TV series based on the Filly franchise were announced, with the working title of "Filly", and the series was set to premiere worldwide in 2014. A teaser for the show was presented at MIPTV in April 2013. On May 29, 2013, the show was renamed to Filly Funtasia, and some of the writers for the show were revealed: Dean Stefan, Noelle Wright, Jymn Magon, Johnny Hartmann, and Sean Derek. BRB Internacional was to distribute the show internationally, except in Germany where Dracco would handle it.

A trailer for the show was uploaded officially by BRB to YouTube on October 15, 2013. Another trailer was released to Twitter on April 11, 2014, featuring clips synced to the show's ending theme, "From Now Until Forever". A third one was released on October 13, 2014, by Funtasia Daily, for BRB offered them the chance to release it to reach a wider audience. A fourth trailer for the show was presented at MIPCOM 2015 and was released on October 6, 2015, featuring clips from the show synced to the show's opening theme, "Magical World".

Two 75-minute specials of the show were announced April 4, 2016, at the MIPTV Media Market titled "Filly Stars" and "Filly Butterfly". Originally produced by BRB's 3D movie division, Apolo Films, no news has surfaced about the current state of the specials and whether they have been cancelled or not as of late. They were meant to be released before the show in order to explain the characters and the world, which explains why Filly Funtasia starts off with no proper introduction.

Later in 2016, BRB and Screen 21 stopped working on the show, and stopped publicly associating with it. It can be assumed that around this time, Black Dragon also quit too. Around 2018, Spanish company B-Water Animation Studios and Hong Kong-based company Guangzhou Huamai Animation Studios joined the production of the series, and worked to complete what the previous studios had left behind. A fifth trailer for the show, which would be the first Filly Funtasia material in a few years, would be released to Vimeo on March 23, 2018, by B-Water. It would also be the last trailer of the show to be released before its premiere one year later.

Filly Funtasia has gone through development hell five years prior to its release, and was delayed many times before it finally premiered in 2019. While the reasons for the delay remain unclear, it likely includes financial problems the Andersen brothers were facing, BRB and Screen 21 suddenly ceasing production of the series on their part, and Dracco initiating legal action against Simba Dickie Group. In the final version of both the English and Chinese credits, nobody from either BRB and Screen 21 or Black Dragon have been credited since those companies backed out of their involvement with the series.

While English is considered the original version of the series, it was not released officially anywhere until 2021; however, various English trailers were released prior. The latest trailers posted by Imira Entertainment in 2019 contain the finalized voices, while the previous trailers released by BRB in 2014 featured different voices. Irish actor Morgan C. Jones, who works for Telegael, has participated in voicing characters in one of these English versions. The final English version, which eventually first saw release in Singapore, was recorded in New York by the studio Audioworks Producers Group. Kip Kaplan was the voice director.

On January 17, 2020, the series was renewed for a second season that was released to iQiyi on December 25, 2020. A trailer for it was posted on November 2, 2020, on the show's official Weibo account. Dracco Brands dropped out of the show in season 2, to be replaced by Zhaolong Culture in 2019. Zhaolong would fund the production of seasons 1 and 2, owning the copyrights, distribution and merchandising rights, and so forth of the series. The series is mainly distributed by Imira Entertainment, which is owned by Toonz Media Group.

Several Chinese sources mentioned the plans on the third season of the show to be created and released in late 2021, which has since been postponed and delayed to release sometime in 2026. From 2023-2024, a couple of storyboard artists and character designers have since shared their progress on the third season, and merchandise of the franchise is still occurring in China.

== Episodes ==
=== Series overview ===
Season	Episodes	Originally released	
Season	Episodes	First released	Last released
1	13	November 28, 2019	December 10, 2019
2	13	December 25, 2020	

=== Season 1 (2019) ===
No.	Title	Directed by	Written by	Original release date	English air date
1	"The Cupcake Mystery" "Liar, Liar, Prance on Fire"	Jacob and Henrik Andersen	Jymn Magon	November 28, 2019 (Note: This episode first premiered worldwide on Frisbee in Italy on March 11, 2019.)	March 22, 2022
When Bella accidentally messes up the cupcakes that she promised to keep safe for Will and the teachers, Rose covers up for her by lying that they were stolen.
2	"The Blue Rainbow" "The Missing Student"	Jacob and Henrik Andersen	Johnny Hartmann	November 29, 2019 (Note: This episode first premiered worldwide on Frisbee in Italy on March 12, 2019.)	March 9, 2022
A blue rainbow appears with an important crystal, so Rose and her crush Zach and the academy's top student are sent to bring it back to the academy.
3	"Wranglum in Disguise" "Wranglum Goes Fillying"	Jacob and Henrik Andersen	Unknown	November 30, 2019 (Note: This episode first premiered worldwide on Frisbee in Italy on March 13, 2019.)	March 28, 2022
Battiwigs finds a crystal that manages to free Wranglum in the form of a female filly, Petunia. It gives him the opportunity to sneak into Miss Sparkle's office for an actual spell before the spell wears off.
4	"Alone at Last"	Jacob and Henrik Andersen	Jymn Magon	December 1, 2019 (Note: This episode first premiered worldwide on Frisbee in Italy on March 14, 2019.)	March 11, 2022
When Lynn tries to find a place to spend time by herself after Rose starts driving her crazy, she heads to the forest and gets lost.
5	"The Evil Garden"	Jacob and Henrik Andersen	Unknown	December 2, 2019 (Note: This episode first premiered worldwide on Frisbee in Italy on March 15, 2019.)	April 4, 2022
Will and the other students are given an assignment to clean an area from a new garden, but Battiwigs secretly plants magic seeds that quickly grow into a lively plant.
6	"Dream of Doom"	Jacob and Henrik Andersen	Unknown	December 3, 2019 (Note: This episode first premiered worldwide on Frisbee in Italy on March 18, 2019.)	March 30, 2022
Cedric fears that Rose might make a fool of herself in an audition, so he tries to stall her so she'll miss her participation.
7	"Bijou on the Loose"	Jacob and Henrik Andersen	Johnny Hartmann	December 4, 2019 (Note: This episode first premiered worldwide on Frisbee in Italy on March 19, 2019.)	March 15, 2022
Rose wants her dorm pet Bijou to look her best for the Annual Pet Parade, but accidentally makes her disappear after attempting a forbidden spell using a mysterious crystal she found.
8	"The Magical Maze"	Jacob and Henrik Andersen	Unknown	December 5, 2019 (Note: This episode first premiered worldwide on Frisbee in Italy on March 20, 2019.)	March 31, 2022
Rose, Will, Lynn and Fabian end up lost in the maze while being persuaded by Wranglum's troll forms.
9	"Teacher for a Day" "Will in Charge"	Jacob and Henrik Andersen	Unknown	December 6, 2019 (Note: This episode first premiered worldwide on Frisbee in Italy on March 21, 2019.)	March 8, 2022
In order to avoid detention, Will is made a teacher for the day, while Battiwigs tries to steal a crystal from Miss Sparkle's office.
10	"Hide and Seek"	Jacob and Henrik Andersen	Armin Prediger	December 7, 2019 (Note: This episode first premiered worldwide on Frisbee in Italy on March 22, 2019.)	March 23, 2022
After Will and Lynn steal the crystal that can teleport anyone holding it for hide and seek, they accidentally release Wranglum.
11	"The Lost Mermaid" "The Lost Filly Mermaid"	Jacob and Henrik Andersen	Carlos Bleycher	December 8, 2019 (Note: This episode first premiered worldwide on Frisbee in Italy on March 25, 2019.)	March 21, 2022
Rose befriends a mermaid filly named Glitterina and travels in the sea.
12	"The Star Crystal"	Jacob and Henrik Andersen	Unknown	December 9, 2019 (Note: This episode first premiered worldwide on Frisbee in Italy on March 26, 2019.)	March 17, 2022
Rose and her friends travel to the caves to find a crystal that fell from the sky.
13	"Farina, the Fire Dragon"	Jacob and Henrik Andersen	Unknown	December 10, 2019 (Note: This episode first premiered worldwide on Frisbee in Italy on March 27, 2019.)	March 7, 2022
Rose and her friends are sent to collect a crystal from a dragon named Farina.

=== Season 2 (2020) ===
The second and final season of the series was released on December 25, 2020. The worldwide premiere for the season was on iQiyi, and unlike the previous season, all episodes were released on the same day.

No. overall	No. in season	Title	Directed by	Written by	Original release date	English air date
14	1	"The Freshmen"	Conan Hu	Unknown	December 25, 2020	March 3, 2022
15	2	"The Treasure Hunt"	Conan Hu	Unknown	December 25, 2020	March 4, 2022
16	3	"Feathers Appear When Angels Are Near"	Conan Hu	Armin Prediger	December 25, 2020	March 10, 2022
17	4	"Art of Magic"	Conan Hu	Armin Prediger	December 25, 2020	March 18, 2022
18	5	"The Spring Ball"	Conan Hu	Unknown	December 25, 2020	April 1, 2022
19	6	"Funtasia Festival"	Conan Hu	Carlos Bleycher	December 25, 2020	March 14, 2022
20	7	"The Hoopenhoof Game"	Conan Hu	Carlos Bleycher	December 25, 2020	March 24, 2022
21	8	"A Visit from Fairy Land"	Conan Hu	Unknown	December 25, 2020	March 16, 2022
22	9	"A Royal Wedding"	Conan Hu	Armin Prediger	December 25, 2020	March 29, 2022
23	10	"A Magical Lesson"	Conan Hu	Unknown	December 25, 2020	March 25, 2022
24	11	"I Dare You"	Conan Hu	Unknown	December 25, 2020	April 5, 2022
25	12	"The Haunted Library"	Conan Hu	Carlos Bleycher	December 25, 2020	April 6, 2022
26	13	"Battle of the Dark Crystal"	Conan Hu	Unknown	December 25, 2020	April 7, 2022

== Broadcast ==
=== Original release ===
Filly Funtasia was originally planned to be released in early 2014, but was delayed to the fourth quarter of 2014. On March 30, 2014, the release date of the show was delayed again to 2015. It was announced that the show would air on Clan in Spain, and later on V-me in the US. The show was delayed again on January 19, 2015, for a 2016 release. On March 10, 2015, it was announced that Filly Funtasia would air on K2 in Italy. On January 16, 2018, the Andersen brothers discussed in an interview that the series was postponed once again for a 2019 release.

The series eventually premiered worldwide in Italian on March 11, 2019, on Frisbee in Italy. In China, the series was officially released with a Mandarin Chinese dub onto iQiyi, with the title The Colorful Wonderland of the Little Fillys, on November 28, 2019. The show had reached more than 2800 viewers in under 24 hours. Later, the series would have its TV premiere on Hunan TV Golden Eagle Cartoon on January 20, 2020. Each of the 13 episodes are split into two 12 to 13-minute episodes, unlike how the show would be broadcast nearly worldwide; the episode order of season two is also specifically different than its intended order.

=== Worldwide release ===
In Ukraine, the series premiered on November 30, 2019, on PLUSPLUS with a Ukrainian dub. Filly Funtasia premiered on September 5, 2020, on Minimax in Hungary, the 7th in Romania and Moldova, the 16th in the Czech Republic, and October 3 in Serbia and Slovenia. Minimax premiered season two in 2021, with its premiere for Hungary on February 6, Czech Republic on February 11, and Serbia with Slovenia on February 15. In Romania, the season premiered later on April 18, 2021.

The series premiered on Arutz HaYeladim in Israel in November 2020, and the two seasons are currently available on the streaming service, BIGI. On February 15, 2021, the series premiered on La Tele Tuya in Venezuela in Latin American Spanish; season two premiered in early June of the same year; like China, season two was released by La Tele Tuya in a very different order as compared to the rest of the world. The series also airs in Latin American Spanish on Clan Internacional worldwide, including Latin America and the United States.

=== English release ===
Since around January 2021, three episodes in English ("Hide and Seek", "The Lost Mermaid", and "Farina, the Fire Dragon") were eventually made available in the United States on the KidsFlix and MyToonz apps, as well as online streaming; both services are owned by Toonz Media Group. These episodes are also available to stream on the Airtel Xstream service in India through KidsFlix.

A different, finalized English release would air on Channel 5 in Singapore starting March 3, 2022, with the season 2 premiere "The Freshmen". The channel also proposes a different episode order, mixing episodes of both season one and two together (all labeled as one season). Episodes are also made available on the meWATCH VOD service after they air. A few episodes in the first season featured at least 1 minute of cut scenes and censorship that was made by the network itself ("The Evil Garden", "Hide and Seek", "The Lost Mermaid", "The Star Crystal", and "Farina, the Fire Dragon"). In some cases this affected certain scenes with plot elements relevant to the episode that were removed.

Alongside the Thai dub, the English version of the series would also be made available on TrueID in Thailand, as a secondary audio track, on April 20, 2022. This release of the series was complete, retaining previously cut scenes from Singapore's release.

There has been no announcements for the English dub release for the United States, Canada or any other English speaking country as of 2026.

== Songs ==
Filly Funtasia has many songs used throughout the series. Nearly all of them have served as background music at some point, playing through certain scenes with the vocals intact, but a few of them have been sung by the characters in-universe. Most of the songs were produced by Klaus Derendorf and Windy Wagner; they were not officially released in full on any soundtrack or album. Artists Drew Seeley, Maria Christensen, Jean-Yves Ducornet, and Leticia Ascencio were credited in the show as "in association with". Due to being a song from the second season, "Amigos" is sung by a different female singer. Moreover, the song "Together with You" in the English version of "The Freshmen" features yet another female lead singer (previously, it had been sung by a male).

The full versions of four songs ("Transformation", "In the Storm", "We Can Find A Way Through It All", and "From Now Until Forever") in English were released in the form of coloring sheet videos through broadcaster Minimax's sites and channels on YouTube, in late May 2021.

In addition, the regular background music heard throughout the series was composed by Giles Packham and John McPhillips. The recording studio was Waveform Studios Dublin.

Title	Performer(s)	Episode
"Magical World"	Windy Wagner	All episodes (opening credits), "The Evil Garden", "Dream of Doom"
"From Now Until Forever"	Windy Wagner	All episodes (ending credits) (Note: Excluding "Bijou on the Loose", which uses "Can't Catch Me Now" for the ending credits.)
"We Can Find A Way Through It All"	—N/a	"The Cupcake Mystery", "The Evil Garden", "Dream of Doom"
"Together with You"	—N/a	"The Blue Rainbow", "The Lost Mermaid", "The Star Crystal"
"Transformation"	—N/a	"Wranglum in Disguise", "Alone at Last"
"In the Storm"	—N/a	"Alone at Last", "The Magical Maze" (Note: This song was sung by Rose in "The Magical Maze", while it was used as background music in "Alone at Last.")
"Sweet Temptation"	—N/a	"Dream of Doom", "Teacher for a Day", "Hide and Seek", "Farina, the Fire Dragon"
"Can't Catch Me Now"	—N/a	"Bijou on the Loose", "Teacher for a Day", "Farina, the Fire Dragon"
"Suspicion"	—N/a	"The Magical Maze", "Hide and Seek", "The Star Crystal"
"I Can Do Anything"	—N/a	"The Lost Mermaid", "The Star Crystal" (Note: This song was sung by Rose in "The Star Crystal", while it was used as background music in "The Lost Mermaid.")
"I Am Who I Am"	—N/a	"Farina, the Fire Dragon" (Note: This song was sung by a character in-universe, instead of being used as background music.)
"Amigos"	—N/a	"Art of Magic"

== Other media ==
=== Short videos ===
Beginning July 13, 2021, the official Ixigua channel of Filly Funtasia in China began releasing short videos no longer than 51 seconds. These shorts mainly revolve around a member of the Filly Five answering an oblivious Will's questions. These were originally recorded in the Mandarin language, as opposed to English like the series itself.

No.	Title	Original release date
1	"小蜜蜂为什么要采蜜？" "Why do little bees collect nectar?"	July 13, 2021
Rose teaches Will how bees make honey.
2	"金蹄杯足球大赛" "Hoopenhoof game competition"	July 19, 2021
Rose comments on the ongoing Hoopenhoof match, but gets bored.
3	"东京奥运英语科普~" "Tokyo Olympics English language lesson"	TBA
Cedric reads out English words of sports teams, asking Will how they would sound.
4	"全民健身日 运动项目英语" "English lesson for National Day of Fitness"	TBA
Cedric shows Will types of sports training, while trying to teach him words in the English language.
5	"暴风雨怎么形成的？" "How do storms come about?"	August 15, 2021
Rose teaches Will how storms are made, whilst outdoors in the middle of one.
6	"蜘蛛丝为什么有粘性？" "Why is spider's silk sticky?"	August 22, 2021
Will learns how spider's silk is sticky when he, along with Rose, Lynn, and Bella get caught in a giant spider's web.
7	"蝙蝠为什么倒挂着睡觉？" "Why do bats sleep upside down?"	August 24, 2021
When playing hide and seek with Lynn, Bella informs Will why bats sleep upside down.
8	"小朋友，我们为什么要睡觉？" "Why do we sleep, children?"	August 30, 2021
Fabian tells Will about sleeping.
9	"教师节快乐" "Happy Teacher's Day"	September 10, 2021
Cedric suggests that Will ask Twilight to answer his question, so that the students can express gratitude.
10	"中秋节的英语怎么说？" "What to say for Mid-Autumn Festival in English?"	September 21, 2021
Mr. Cookintot bakes mooncakes for the Mid-Autumn Festival, with Will and Cedric present. Later, Will tries to say something related to the holiday in English.

=== Video games ===
Various games of Filly Funtasia for Android, iOS and HTML5 were made during the several years of production of the series, hosted on different sites, and using materials created for the series.

Slide puzzles were made for the show as well, but they were eventually deleted from the app store.

=== Merchandise ===
Toys of Filly Funtasia that were meant for China only, and made in partnership with Seasun were released in 2020, while the newest merchandise was released in 2021, made in accordance with both Chinese and European standards, and includes trading and collectible cards, blind bag figurines with Swarovski elements (in the style of first Filly toys) or big figurines with character cards and Preciosa elements, reused Filly Ballerina's toy set with a filly toy (and judging by iABC's article's photo, reused Filly Butterfly's toy set with a mushroom, and reused Filly Wedding toys), mirrors in two colours inspired by Bella's mirror design, various accessories for girls and soft, velvet like figurine of Rose (the only one with such surface, unlike in times of classic Filly toys). Additionally, there are clothes for kids created by YouYouYu, pencils for school, dishware and more.

== Reception ==
=== Accolades ===
On August 23, 2018, the episode "The Blue Rainbow" (at the time known as "The Missing Student") was nominated in the Best Animation category in the 58th Asia-Pacific Film Festival, before the series premiered. It lost to Fundamental.

=== Controversy ===
In China, mostly on Weibo where the show has an official verified account there, reception of the show has been mixed since its release there. While some have been praising it, many articles have came out claiming that the show plagiarized My Little Pony: Friendship Is Magic, as both center on colorful equines, and that it is not a real domestic Chinese cartoon due to being a co-production and being released first in Italy. They also point out that in Chinese, the title of the show is one character off from Friendship Is Magic's.

== Internet popularity ==
On October 16, 2013, one day after BRB Internacional had released the first trailer for Filly Funtasia on YouTube, Shaun Scotellaro of Equestria Daily had reported on the show's existence, calling Filly a "copycat brand". What resulted after were a lot of mixed reactions to the show, with many disregarding it as a My Little Pony: Friendship Is Magic rip-off before it premiered, and others claiming that it reminded them of the third generation ("G3") of My Little Pony (which wasn't typically regarded as good by bronies at that time). An intern at BRB responded calmly to a lot of the YouTube comments on the trailer that arouse from the situation before the video was privated, then unlisted with comments disabled. The show was also reported on the site in 2014 and 2015 due to the new trailers that were being released.

In the midst of the brony fandom becoming aware of the show, Funtasia Daily was created by Skundi on October 24, 2013. The intention of the site is to report on all Filly related news, much like Equestria Daily does for Friendship Is Magic. Some articles were also written by Zejgar. As a response to the 4chan and Ponychan threads on the show dying, Skundi also created Fillychan on January 24, 2015. The show would gain a minimal fanbase of its own, with some taking an ironic interest in the show. Memes about the show were prevalent at the peak of its popularity, including the frequent joke that the show was the next generation ("G5") of My Little Pony.

Tine was interviewed by Skundi of Funtasia Daily in June 2015, using questions that were asked by the community. Notably, Tine noticed the Filly Funtasia fandom and acknowledged the term "Funtasian", which would be the equivalent of bronies.

After a long period of silence, Equestria Daily would report on the show's comeback in 2019, and the reception to the show was notably more positive than it was before. One of the earliest reuploads of the first trailer of the show has over 1 million views as of February 2020.
