= Backkom Bear: Agent 008 =

- Poster
- Chinese: 大卫贝肯之倒霉特工熊
- Directed by: Li Qingfang
- Based on: Backkom by Jose Luis Ucha Enriquez; Claudio Biern Lliviria
- Production companies: Alpha Pictures Investment (Beijing); Alpha Pictures (Shanghai); Harbin Pinge Media; Pinngo; RG Animation Studios
- Distributed by: Alpha Pictures (Shanghai); Horgos Xinyue Entertainment; Xinyue Pictures; Suzhou Wuzhi Animation; Entertainment One (United States and Canada)
- Release dates: 13 January 2017 (China); 3 May 2017 (South Korea)
- Running time: 86 minutes
- Countries: China; South Korea
- Language: Mandarin
- Box office: CN¥46.9 million

Backkom Bear: Agent 008 (Chinese: 大卫贝肯之倒霉特工熊) is a 2017 Chinese animated adventure comedy-drama film directed by Li Qingfang, based on the Backkom animated series. It was released in China on 13 January 2017. This film serves as a prequel to the show. As of 2019, the film has yet to be released in English.

A sequel titled Agent Backkom: Kings Bear was released on 8 February 2020.

== Plot ==
In 2003, humans blow up all of Antarctica with Backkom's mother and baby Backkom with mother's death. He is later adopted by a young girl named Jessica and then name is Backkom.

Three years later, Backkom is at the Zoo (where he is sleeping every time people see him). An annoyed boy throws a can at him which Backkom makes fly back to him. Backkom works as a janitor at the Security Department. A man's head catches fire after an explosive pen blows up, Backkom hits him in the head with a shovel. Suddenly polar bears drop bombs all over the city, because humans destroyed their homes, so they decide to destroy human's homes too. An agent sneaks into the polar bear's spaceship, which he gets caught and frozen. The people put a super brain chip into Backkom turning him into a spy (but he's still dumb).

Backkom goes into a training montage, but fails remembering his mother's "death". Backkom is sent on a mission to sneak into the polar bear's base and get rid of the bombs. The villain catches Jessica and looks through her memories. Backkom tries to defuse the bombs, but is unable to. Backkom finds out that the polar bear behind all this was actually his mother. Many years ago after Antarctica blew up, humans used polar bears to do experiments on, which turned Backkom's mother evil.

The president's deranged assistant launches a missile, which is stopped by Backkom's mother. Backkom decides to live with his family and the other polar bears. A robotic bee comes out of a fish stinging Backkom in the butt.

In a mid-credits scene, Backkom and Jessica try to stop penguins from destroying the world. Only for Backkom to screw up and chased by the penguins into the frozen castle.

== Cast ==
- Tang Shuiyu
- Xu Jiaqi
- Yang Mo

== Release ==
The film was released in China on 13 January 2017. In South Korea the film was released on 3 May 2017.

=== Marketing ===
A trailer was released on 16 December 2016.

The film had also released posters parodying American films, such as Monsters, Inc., Cars, TMNT, Spider-Man 3, Avatar, How to Train Your Dragon, Despicable Me, and The Smurfs, as well as posters also parodying Pokémon, My Neighbor Totoro, Doraemon, Kung Fu Panda, Big Hero 6, and Zootopia.

== Reception ==
The film has grossed CN¥46.9 million in China.
