= Agent Backkom: Kings Bear =

2020 Chinese animated comedy film

- Poster
- Chinese: 贝肯熊2：金牌特工
- Directed by: Zhang Yang
- Screenplay by: Zhang Yang; Liu Peiru; Pan Yiran
- Story by: Liu Xuanqi
- Based on: Backkom by Jose Luis Ucha Enriquez; Claudio Biern Lliviria
- Produced by: Wang Yilin
- Music by: Zhang Ye
- Production companies: Alpha Group Co., Ltd. StarDragon
- Distributed by: Beijing Zhonghe Qiancheng Film and Television Culture Media; Alpha Group Co., Ltd.
- Release date: 23 July 2021
- Running time: 95 minutes
- Countries: China; South Korea
- Language: Mandarin
- Box office: $5.2 million

Agent Backkom: Kings Bear (Chinese: 贝肯熊2：金牌特工; lit. 'Bacon Bear 2: Gold Agent') is a 2021 Chinese animated adventure comedy film. Directed by Zhang Yang, who also wrote the film with Liu Peiru and Pan Yiran, the film is a sequel to 2017's Backkom Bear: Agent 008, which in turn is based on the Backkom animated series.

== Plot ==
In 2013, Agent Backkom is sent on a mission to protect a valuable diamond that has been stolen by a criminal organization. He is tasked with delivering the diamond to its rightful owner, the King's Bear, who lives in a remote and mysterious castle in the mountains.

Along the way, Agent Backkom encounters various obstacles and challenges, including the King's Bear's army of fierce animal guards and a treacherous traitor within his own team. Despite his clumsiness and lack of skills, Agent Backkom manages to overcome each challenge with his quick-thinking and unconventional methods.

As Agent Backkom arrives at the King's Bear's castle, he discovers a shocking truth: the King's Bear has been kidnapped by the criminal organization, and they are using the diamond as ransom. With the help of his team and the animal guards, Agent Backkom launches a daring rescue mission to save the King's Bear and retrieve the diamond.

In the climax, Agent Backkom fights the leader of the criminal organization and his henchmen. Agent Backkom emerges victorious, saves the King's Bear, and returns the diamond to its owner.

== Release ==
The film was scheduled to be released in China in February 2020, but was not released due to COVID-19. It was scheduled to release in the second quarter of 2021.
