= Mug Travel =

- Theatrical poster
- Directed by: Aaron Lim
- Written by: Aaron Lim
- Based on: Bernard
- Produced by: Claudio Biern Boyd; Kang-Hoi Kim
- Starring: Stephen Hudges; Lee Seon-jin
- Music by: Tae-gyun Kim
- Production company: RG Animation Studios
- Distributed by: CJ-CGV
- Release date: 22 March 2007
- Running time: 76 minutes
- Country: South Korea
- Language: Korean
- Box office: $608,835

Mug Travel (Korean: 빼꼼의 머그잔 여행; RR: Ppaekkomui meogeujan yeohaeng), known as My Friend Bernard in English, is a 2007 South Korean computer-animated film, directed by Aaron Lim and based on his animated TV series, Bernard.

== Plot ==
A little boy named Bebe (known as Sam in the English version), all alone on Christmas, is given a magical pendant from Santa Claus and embarks on a fantastical adventure. Traveling in a giant mug with the power of teleportation, Bebe explores a variety of exotic locations, accompanied by a host of characters including Backkom the polar bear (Bernard in the English version) and Kongkong the penguin (Lloyd in the English version). Bebe and her friends go on a series of adventures through an ice world and a desert oasis. During this trip they encounter a variety of challenges, including a sea monster and an ominous cave.

== Production ==
Produced by RG Animation Studios and directed by Aaron Lim, Mug Travel is a feature film adaptation of Lim's computer-animated TV series Backkom. The film and TV series were made at the same time on a combined budget of $5.9 million, after Lim noticed a gap in the market for shows aimed at preschool children.

== Release ==
Mug Travel was released in South Korea on 22 March 2007, and was ranked eighth at the Korean box office on its opening weekend with 48,244 admissions. Over the course of its theatrical run, the film accumulated a total of 135,261 admissions nationwide, and grossed $608,835.

Mug Travel was screened at the Fifth Bimini Animation Festival, held in Latvia in March 2007, where it was the winner of "The Best Film for Children" award. It was subsequently selected to participate in the non-competition category at the Brussels International Festival of Fantastic Film, which ran from 5–17 April 2007 in Belgium.

== See also ==
- Korean animation
- List of Christmas films
