= Bernard (TV series) =

Animated television series

- Poster of Bernard
- Also known as: Backkom
- Genre: Comedy
- Created by: Jose Luis Ucha Enriquez; Claudio Biern Lliviria
- Developed by: RG Animation Studios
- Written by: Iñaki San Román; Sergio V. Santesteban
- Directed by: Claudio Biern Lliviria; José Luis Ucha; Aaron Lim (animation director)
- Creative director: Toni García
- Voices of: Marie Fagundo; Sly Johnson
- Composer: Óscar Maced Rodríguez
- Countries of origin: South Korea; Spain; France; China
- No. of seasons: 3
- No. of episodes: 156 (list of episodes)

Production
- Executive producers: Carlos Biern; Sirl Oscar
- Producers: Claudio Biern Boyd; Javier Robles de Acuna; Kwang-Deok Kim; Kwang-Hoi Kim; Natalie Altmann; Gilles Romele
- Editor: Roberto H.G.
- Running time: 3 minutes
- Production companies: BRB Internacional; EBS Productions; RG Animation Studios; Screen21; Synergy Media (season 2); SK Broadband (season 3)

Original release
- Network: EBS; M6; CBBC; AnimaKids
- Release: 18 December 2006 – 2009

Bernard, known as Backkom (Korean: 빼꼼) in South Korea and Berni in Spain, is an animated television series produced by BRB Internacional, EBS Productions, RG Animation Studios, Screen21, Synergy Media (season 2) and SK Broadband (season 3), with the investment of the French broadcaster M6. The animation style is of a combination of computer-generated and cel animation. The stories are written by the creative studio Screen21, the directors are José Luis Ucha Enríquez and Claudio Biern Lliviria. The music was written by Oscar Maceda Rodríguez. Bernard also was a part of Cartoon Network's Sunday Pants.

In South Korea, the first season aired on EBS TV from January 2006 to December 2007, the second season aired from May 2008 to December 2009, while the third season premiered on 21 November 2009 and consisted of sports-related episodes.

== Plot ==
The show focuses on a curious polar bear named Bernard, whose bumbling slapstick antics and clumsiness typically result in him being knocked unconscious or injured near the end of an episode. Bernard does not speak, but sometimes communicates through guttural sounds. He is joined with Lloyd and Eva the penguins, Zack the lizard, as well as Goliath the chihuahua.

== Episodes ==
Series	Episodes	Originally released	
Series	Episodes	First released	Last released
1	52	18 December 2006	30 December 2007
2	52	May 2008	December 2009
3	52	November 2009	2009

=== Season 1 (2006–07) ===
No.	Title	Original release date	Prod. code
1–6	"The Gym/Golf/Ice Climbing/The Swing/Security Guard/The Vending Machine"	18 December 2006	101
The Gym: Bernard goes to the gym bathroom and quickly turns a simple task of exercising into a complicated challenge. Golf: Bernard experiences the powerful attraction of the golf course and pull of gravity. Ice Climbing: Once Bernard has found all his equipment, he sets off to climb the highest peak. However, the closer he gets to the summit, the trickier it becomes. The Swing: Bernard finds a tree with a swing which Lloyd wants got there first. Security Guard: Bernard gets a job at the museum to exhibit his arts. The Vending Machine: Bernard struggles to learn sportsmanship he fights with Zack over a drink in the vending machine.
7–12	"Diving Board/Watching TV/Hitchhiking/Sky Diving/At the Theme Park/A Day in the Country"	3 January 2007	102
Diving Board: Bernard desperately tries to copy all the things that Lloyd the penguin enjoys doing at the swimming pool, including diving from the highest springboard!. Watching TV: Bernard is completely hooked on television until the shop closes and shutters come down. Hitchhiking: Bernard stops to pick up Zack and reminds him to have a lift someday. Skydiving: Bernard is bound to forget his parachute. At the Theme Park: While Bernard is having a good time at the theme park, a balloon appears when someone asks for a photo. A Day in the Country: Bernard has gone to the mountain while the mountain comes to him.
13–17	"Learning to Fly/Close Encounters/The Intruder/Basketball/The Cart"	6 January 2007	103
Learning to Fly: Bernard learns to fly. Close Encounters: Bernard is delighted to receive a visit from a small extraterrestrial, but his visitor is less than delighted by his limited technological skills. The Intruder: Bernard's dinner is interrupted by an intruder. Basketball: Bernard plays basketball against Zack. The Cart: Bernard tries to cross a motorcycle with a supermarket cart.
18–22	"The Supermarket/The Mosquito/Oasis/The Treasure/The Window Cleaner"	16 October 2007	104
The Supermarket: Bernard is delighted with all the bargains he has bought. However, Bernard struggles to get them all home through a single revolving door. The Mosquito: Bernard feels very tired and wants to sleep for hours, but there's a mosquito about with other ideas. Oasis: In the middle of the desert, Bernard stumbles across an oasis. The palm trees look real enough, and that cool water is just too tempting. The Treasure: Bernard finds a map that may lead him to the hidden treasure, but does not always tell him about the hidden dangers. Even Indiana Jones would have had trouble here. The Window Cleaner: Bernard is cleaning the windows of a skyscraper, when he disturbs two birds trying to protect their fledgling.
5	"Street Racing/The Desert Island/Baseball/The Car/The Flower"	10 November 2007	105
Street Racing: When Zack lines up alongside him at the traffic lights, it gives Bernard the perfect excuse to start a race through the city streets. The Desert Island: Bernard finds himself on a desert island where all existing forces of nature try to make him feel welcome in their own special way. Baseball: Bernard figures out how the baseball pitching machine works, until the machine steps up a gear and shows it has a few more tricks up its sleeve. The Car: Bernard is proud of his small convertible, but cannot get everything in the boot, which leads to a more complicated life than he would imagine. The Flower: Bernard loves his flower and is determined to do whatever is necessary to protect it from danger, regardless of the cost.
6	"Sleepwalker/The Pizza/The Unicycle/The Motorboat/The Prisoner"	10 November 2007	106
Sleepwalker: Even when he is asleep, Bernard is capable of anything, as he finds out when he wakes up in the morning. The Pizza: Bernard has to deliver a pizza to a haunted house to feed its starving owner. The Unicycle: Much to Zack's surprise, Bernard discovers he has some performing unicycle skills which he never knew he had. The Motorboat: Although Bernard has been shipwrecked, his real problems begin when he finds an abandoned motorboat which could get him back to shore. The Prisoner: Bernard makes a daring escape from prison.
7	"Bowling/Taekwondo/Scuba Diving/Doors/At the Museum"	10 November 2007	107
Bowling: Bernard plays bowling against Lloyd. Taekwondo: Wanting to recover his property from Zack, Bernard takes up taekwondo. He develops awesome skills, but the result is not quite what he had planned. Scuba Diving: Bernard goes scuba diving, but soon realizes that not everything is quite what it seems under the sea. Doors: Bernard struggles to be able to negotiate revolving doors, even when they have their arms full of packages. At the Museum: Bernard visit museums containing thousands of priceless exhibits that have been carefully preserved for 100 years.
8	"A Lucky Day/The Storm/The Robot/The Vacuum Cleaner/The Package"	21 November 2007	108
A Lucky Day: Bernard wants to have a lucky day. The Storm: Once Bernard had a polar home on the ice cap, but a lightning strike during a polar thunderstorm forces him to leave it all behind. The Robot: A robot seems to offer Bernard a simple solution to the problem of cleaning his house. The trouble is that the robot is literally crazy about his job. The Vacuum Cleaner: When the vacuum cleaner finishes its work, there is no speck of dust anywhere, and no sign of Bernard's winning lottery ticket either!. The Package: Zack tries to steal a parcel which Bernard is carrying. Zack initially succeeded, but Bernard does not give up that easily.
9	"Marathon/The Fumigator 1/The Fumigator 2/Close Encounters 2/The Little Dog"	27 November 2007	109
Marathon: Bernard, Zack and Lloyd are competing in a marathon. The winner will not be the one who runs the fastest, but the one who survives the longest. The Fumigator: Bernard, who dislikes cockroaches, is determined to get them out of his house somehow. The Fumigator 2: Continuing from the first part, the cockroaches are taking over Bernard's house despite his efforts, until his patience runs out. Close Encounters 2: When another UFO appears on Bernard's radar, he is desperate to see what is inside the strange carapace, but the extraterrestrial is impatient show himself. The Little Dog: Goliath the Chihuahua packs a charge of aggression and bad temper equivalent to someone several times his size as Bernard discovers.
10	"The Medallion/The Moth/Bullfighter/At the North Pole/A Day in the Country 2"	30 December 2007	110
The Medallion: Bernard finds a medallion which is soon revealed to bring bad luck. He tries to throw it away, but to no avail. The Moth: When Bernard tries to get rid of an annoying moth, his kitchen becomes a dangerous place. Bullfighter: Bernard finds himself in a field full of bulls, and despite his lack of experience, he decides to try his hand at bull-fighting. At the North Pole: Bernard gets bored trekking across the frozen Arctic wastes. Some abandoned equipment becomes a source of great entertainment, but not for long. A Day in the Country 2: Bernard wants to enjoy nature, but the fauna and flora want to enjoy him at the same time.

=== Season 2 (2008) ===
No.	Title	Original release date	Prod. code
1	"Football"	June 9, 2008	237
2	"The Fossil"	June 9, 2008	241
3	"Boxing"	June 10, 2008	220
4	"Kendo"	June 10, 2008	206
5	"Boy Scout"	2008	223
6	"The Little Dog 2"	2008	214
7	"The Magic Lamp"	2008	209
8	"The Olympic Torch"	2008	226
9	"Saving Eva"	2008	204
10	"Ice Cream"	2008	208
11	"Fishing"	2008	221
12	"The Gym 2"	2008	213
13	"A Leap in the Dark"	2008	219

=== Season 3 (2009) ===
No.	Title	Original release date	Prod. code
1	"Football"	2009	301
2	"The Fossil"	2009	302
3	"Boxing"	2009	303
4	"Kendo"	2009	304
5	"Boy Scout"	2009	305
6	"The Little Dog 2"	2009	306
7	"The Magic Lamp"	2009	307
8	"The Olympic Torch"	2009	308
9	"Saving Eva"	2009	309
10	"The Ice Cream"	2009	310
11	"Fishing"	2009	311
12	"The Gym 2"	2009	312
13	"A Leap in the Dark"	2009	313
14	"Beach Volleyball"	2009	314
15	"Motorcycling"	2009	315
16	"Tennis"	2009	316
17	"Basketball Wheels"	2009	317
18	"Horse Training"	2009	318
19	"Basketball 2"	2009	319
20	"Judo"	2009	320
21	"Mountain Bike"	2009	321
22	"Kayak"	2009	322
23	"Paragliding"	2009	323
24	"Olympic Handball"	2009	324
25	"Skiing"	2009	325
26	"Hammer Throw"	2009	326
27	"Fencing"	2009	401
28	"Handball"	2009	402
29	"Alpine Skiing" "(Skiing 2)"	2009	403
30	"Pole Vault"	2009	404
31	"Table Tennis"	2009	405
32	"Weightlifting"	2009	405
33	"Archery"	2009	406
34	"Karate"	2009	407
35	"Paddle"	2009	408
36	"Chess"	2009	409
37	"Walk"	2009	410
38	"Badminton"	2009	411
39	"Goalball"	2009	412
40	"Indoor Football"	2009	413
41	"Triathlon"	2009	501
42	"High Jump"	2009	502
43	"Marathon 2"	2009	503
44	"Rugby"	2009	504
45	"Motor Racing"	2009	504
46	"Sprint"	2009	505
47	"Snowboard"	2009	506
48	"Gymnastics"	2009	507
49	"Hockey"	2009	508
50	"Aerobics"	2009	509
51	"Swimming"	2009	510
52	"Windsurfing"	2009	511

== Film (2007) ==
Title	Original release date
Mug Travel	22 March 2007
Bebe, a little girl who is alone on Christmas Eve, is given a magical pendant from Santa Claus and embarks on a fantastical adventure. Travelling in a mug with the power of teleportation, she explores various exotic locations from the desert to the North Pole, accompanied by a Bernard and Lloyd.

== See also ==
- Mug Travel
- Backkom Bear: Agent 008
- Agent Backkom: Kings Bear
- Pat & Stan
