= The Cobi Troupe =

Spanish animated television series

- Screenplay by: Javier Mariscal; Tricicle
- Creative director: Javier Mariscal
- Music by: Xavier Capellas
- Country of origin: Spain
- Original languages: Castilian Spanish; Catalan
- No. of seasons: 1
- No. of episodes: 26

Production
- Executive producer: Claudio Biern Boyd
- Producer: Olivia Borricon
- Production companies: Olympic Organizing Committee Barcelona'92; BRB Internacional
- Budget: 350 million ₧

Original release
- Network: FORTA channels
- Release: October 1991 – 1992

The Cobi Troupe is a Spanish animated television series produced by the Olympic Organizing Committee Barcelona'92 and BRB Internacional. With creative and artistic direction by Javier Mariscal, screenplay by Tricicle and music by Xavier Capellas, it recounts the adventures of Cobi, the official mascot of the 1992 Summer Olympics, his friend Petra, the official mascot of the 1992 Summer Paralympics, and their group of friends.

== Premise ==
Cobi resides in the observatory at Tibidabo hill in Barcelona, together with his friend Petra and their group of friends they live great adventures before and during the 1992 Summer Olympics and Paralympic Games, where they confront the plans of the villain Doctor Normal and his assistant Tamino.

== Production ==
The Cobi Troupe was created with the aim of promoting the Games to be held in Barcelona in 1992. Produced by the Olympic Organizing Committee Barcelona'92 (COOB'92) and BRB Internacional, it had a budget of 350 million pesetas. The drawings and animation were made by BRB Internacional itself in Madrid, with the exception of some episodes which were animated by the Jade Animation studio in China, under the creative and artistic direction of Javier Mariscal himself, the actual designer of the official mascots. His studio had design responsibility for all the characters and control over the making of the animation.

The series, with 26 half-hour episodes with three short stories each, focused on a children's audience between five and twelve years old, has a simple plot that uses surrealism to encourage children's imagination written by the members of the theater company Tricicle.

== Broadcast ==
The series, which was originally scheduled to be broadcast in Spain on Televisión Española (TVE), was broadcast on the different regional broadcasters that were part of the Federation of Regional Organizations of Radio and Television (FORTA) in their respective territories, dubbed into the corresponding language, between the end of 1991 and 1992. The broadcasting rights were later bought by twenty-four television channels around the world, including TVE.

== Comic albums ==
Together with the television series, a series of six comic albums was released, merging the plot of several different television episodes together to create a long and continuous story. They were published by Plaza & Janés in Spain in Spanish and Catalan.
