= Around the World with Willy Fog =

Spanish animated television series

- Spanish: La vuelta al mundo de Willy Fog
- Genre: Adventure
- Based on: Around the World in Eighty Days by Jules Verne
- Developed by: Claudio Biern Boyd
- Theme music composer: Guido and Maurizio De Angelis
- Opening theme: "La vuelta al mundo de Willy Fog" by Mocedades
- Ending theme: "Sílbame" by Mocedades
- Country of origin: Spain
- Original language: Spanish
- No. of episodes: 26 (list of episodes)

Production
- Running time: 26 mins
- Production companies: BRB Internacional; Televisión Española

Original release
- Network: TVE1
- Release: 8 January – 15 July 1984

Related
- Willy Fog 2 (1994–95)

Around the World with Willy Fog (Spanish: La vuelta al mundo de Willy Fog) is a Spanish animated television adaptation of the 1873 novel Around the World in Eighty Days by Jules Verne. It was produced by Spanish studio BRB Internacional and Televisión Española, with animation by Japanese studio Nippon Animation, and was first broadcast on TVE1 weekly in 1984.

Jules Verne's original characters are depicted as animals in the series. The core trio are all felines being pursued by three canine foes. Willy Fog (Phileas Fogg in the original book) is depicted as a lion, while Rigodon (Passepartout) is a cat, and Romy (Aouda) is a panther.

An English dub of the series was directed by Tom Wyner, which featured the voices of Cam Clarke (Rigodon), Gregory Snegoff (Inspector Dix), and Mike Reynolds (additional voices). It was broadcast on the BBC in the United Kingdom in 1987 and on RTÉ in Ireland. The series was also dubbed into Japanese and aired on Japan's TV Asahi in 1987, where it was titled Anime Around the World in 80 Days (アニメ80日間世界一周, Anime Hachijūnichikan Sekai Isshū).

A sequel series, Willy Fog 2 (1993), adapts Verne's novels Journey to the Center of the Earth and Twenty Thousand Leagues Under the Seas. A theatrical musical show was produced in Spain in 2008 in celebration of its 25th anniversary.

== Plot ==
Willy Fog awakens and rings for his servant, only to remember that he had fired him the previous day for his inability to follow Fog's precise schedule. He interviews and hires a replacement – the former circus performer Rigodon – before leaving for the Reform Club.

At the club, the members discuss the recent theft of £55,000 from the Bank of England, until the bank's governor, Mr. Sullivan, arrives. An article in the Morning Chronicle details how it is now possible to travel around the world in eighty days. The article states that one departs London by train for Dover, where one crosses to Calais, and on to Paris. From there, it is a train journey to Brindisi, and the Suez Canal, all within a week. Having rounded the Arabian peninsula, one would arrive in Bombay on day 20 and then a three-day railway journey to Calcutta. Hong Kong is reached on day 33, Yokohama on day 39, and then a mammoth three-week crossing of the Pacific to arrive in San Francisco on day 61, a week-long train crossing to New York City and then finally a nine-day crossing of the Atlantic back to London making it possible to circumnavigate the globe in eighty days.

The other members of the club laugh at Lord Guinness's suggestion that he would have taken on the challenge himself if he were younger. Fog rises to defend the Lord's honour by taking up the task himself. Sullivan bets Fog £5,000 that it is impossible, and additional wagers by three other club members increase this amount to £20,000. He then stuns the club by announcing that he will leave that evening and promises to return to the club by 8:45 pm on 21 December 1872.

Rigodon is not impressed to hear the news of their impending trip, having spent his life travelling with the circus, but he dutifully accompanies his master as they set out. They however don't know that they are pursued by three individuals determined to halt their progress. Inspector Dix and Constable Bully of Scotland Yard are convinced that Fog is the thief who robbed the Bank of England, and the wicked Transfer, a saboteur, was hired by Mr. Sullivan to impede Fog's journey.

== Characters ==
=== Main characters ===
Willy Fog
Phileas Fogg in the original novel shares the name for the original character's inspiration, William Perry Fogg. He is a well-mannered lion, well-read London gentleman who is loyal to his friends and always true to his word. He leads his life according to many strict, precise rules. He rejects violence of any form whenever possible, but is never without his cane, which is all he needs to defend himself and others. Fog is a member of the Reform Club in London and is challenged to travel around the world in eighty days.
Rigodon
He takes the role of Passepartout from the original novel. The Greek dubbing names him Rico, whereas in the Brazilian, Finnish, French, Hebrew and Slovak dubbing he was named Passepartout. Before working for Willy Fog, multi-talented French cat Rigodon was a circus performer. Wanting to escape the travelling life of the circus, Rigodon sought out employment as a manservant. His first attempt was a failure, as he worked for a gentleman who constantly travelled, and so he sought out employment with Willy Fog, knowing that Fog's strict routine meant he never travelled far. Rigodon's hopes of a quiet lifestyle, however, were quickly dashed when Fog accepted the wager to travel around the world in eighty days. Nevertheless, Rigodon dutifully accompanies his master on his trip, his circus-born agility and daring coming in handy on more than one occasion.
Tico
Tico, a pika, is Rigodon's best friend and former partner in the circus. The pair are inseparable. Rigodon is forced to hide Tico from Mr. Fog at first, concealing the small character within his travelling bag until their journey was underway. Tico is well known for his epic appetite, and is rarely seen without his "sun-clock", an archaeological artifact gifted to him early on the trip that uses the sun to tell time.
Princess Romy
She is based on the character of Aouda from the original novel. An orphaned panther following the deaths of her parents, Romy became a princess when she was married to an Indian Rajah who worshipped the goddess Kali. When the Rajah died, she was destined to be burned alongside him on the funeral pyre, but was rescued by Rigodon, who risked his own life in the process. She originally accompanies Willy Fog on his journey with the intent of finding her relatives in Singapore, only to stay with his company after finding them long dead. She acts as a medic to care for the wounded they encounter.
Inspector Dix
He is based on Inspector Fix from the original novel. He is a scent hound who works for Scotland Yard. Convinced that Fog is responsible for robbing the Bank of England, he trails the travellers around the world looking for the proof he needs to arrest Fog. He constantly tries to delay their travels to keep them on British soil so that he might arrest them, if the warrant he awaits is ever delivered.
Constable Bully
He is a cockney bulldog, Inspector Dix's partner. He resents the trip around the world. A good-hearted fellow at his core, Bully is subject to the whims of the demanding but honourable Inspector Dix, and his general clumsiness and tendency to get travel-sick often strain the inspector's patience to the breaking point.
Transfer
Transfer is a gray wolf, hired to sabotage Fog's journey by his rival, Mr. Sullivan. Throughout the series, he employs a variety of tactics to delay Fog and his party, ranging from leading them in the wrong direction to deliberately causing accidents. He is a master of disguise and can imitate perfectly the voices and mannerisms of those he is impersonating.

=== Supporting characters ===
Mr. Sullivan
He is the head of the Bank of England, a wolf and rival of Willy Fog in the Reform Club. He accepts Fog's bet and, determined to ensure Fog's failure and expose him as a "worthless bragger", decides to send a saboteur, Transfer, after Fog's steps.
Farrel, Johnson, and Weston
They are the other Reform Club members who bet against Fog. Weston (a stoat) is the owner of the Morning Chronicle and Ralph's boss, while Farrel (a fox) and Johnson (a raccoon) own a shipping line and a railway respectively.
Lord Guinness
Lord Guinness, the oldest member of the Reform Club, is a white goat. He and Ralph continue to support Fog and his party, even when popular opinion has turned against them.
Ralph
Ralph, a squirrel, is the idealistic young reporter who wrote the article which inspired Fog's journey. Even when the odds seemed stacked against Fog and his party, he rarely loses hope that they will succeed.
Commissioner Rowan
Commissioner Rowan, a cat, is the head of Scotland Yard and was the one responsible for sending Dix and Bully after Fog, warning them they would be fired if they bungled the assignment.
Brigadier Corn
A deer, member of the British Army stationed in India, Brigadier Corn is on his way to rejoin his regiment when he crosses paths with Fog and his friends. He chooses to accompany them on their journey through India "for the honour of Great Britain", and is instrumental in helping to mount the rescue of Princess Romy.
Parsi
Parsi is an Indian tiger who is the owner of an elephant named Koa. Parsi is friendly and loyal to his elephant, and he helps Willy Fog and his team to reach Alakhabad, despite the difficulties that occurred due to the actions of Transfer.
Andrew Speedy
Andrew Speedy (a bear) is the short-tempered Russian captain of the cargo ship Henrietta. He does not normally carry passengers, believing them to be a liability, but agrees to take Fog and his party after Fog offers to pay him $2,000 for every member of his party. After falling victim to Transfer's attempt to poison Fog, he gives Fog command of the ship and orders him to head for Liverpool.

=== Voice cast ===
Character	Spanish	English
Willy Fog	Claudio Rodríguez	unknown
Romy	Gloria Cámara	unknown
Rigodon	Manuel Peiró	Cam Clarke
Tico	José Moratalla	Gregory Snegoff
Dix	Rafael de Penagos	Gregory Snegoff
Bully	Luis Marín	unknown
Transfer	Antolín García	Tom Wyner
Narrator	Teófilo Martínez	Theodore Lehmann (eps. 1-22) unknown (eps. 23-26)

== Music ==
=== Spanish ===
Six songs were crafted for the series, composed by Italian background score writers Guido and Maurizio De Angelis and performed by the group Mocedades. The members of the group provided the singing voices for the animated characters. The eponymous theme song, "La vuelta al mundo de Willy Fog", is performed by Fog, Rigodon, Tico, and Romy; while Rigodon and Tico also performed the ending theme, "Sílbame" ("Whistle to Me"). Extended versions of both songs are regularly sung by the characters in-show in short musical numbers during the course of the series, including the "Dix y Transfer" duet and two additional songs performed by the protagonists entitled "América, América" and "Hay que viajar" ("It Is Necessary to Travel"). The sixth song, "Romy", was performed by the titular character, although it is only featured in the series in an instrumental form. It would, however, later be used as the closing theme of the sequel series, Willy Fog 2. The Spanish soundtrack was released in 1984 on LP album, CD and cassette formats. The soundtrack in Spanish is available to download online.

=== English ===
The songs in the English dub of the series were sung by Ted Mather, re-using the De Angelis's music but with new English lyrics that are similar to the original Spanish. "Hay que viajar" was retitled "Daisy" and became a song about a woman by that name. "Sílbame" was retitled "Rigodon". All six songs were re-recorded in their entirety, including "Romy", which did not appear in the series. The English soundtrack is also available to download online.

=== Other languages ===
The Japanese dub of the series uses two different theme tunes composed specifically for it, both sung by Keiko Han. The opening theme is entitled "Sky Way", while the closing tune is named "Our Two Watches".

Songs in the Finnish dub were sung by the actors of Yle Import re-using the De Angelis's music but with new Finnish lyrics. In the Finnish dub some scenes are cut, which includes musical numbers in some episodes.

In the Czech dub, some scenes from some episodes are cut (including the songs), but those "deleted scenes" are used in the opening and ending.

== Crew ==
=== Spanish production ===
- Produced by: BRB Internacional
- With the collaboration of: Televisión Española
- Music by: Guido & Maurizio De Angelis
- Music producer: Cabum Magister
- Outdoors location scouting: Iberia, the airline of Spain
- Songs performed by: Mocedades
- Songs performed in: Discos CBS
- Directed by: Luis Ballester
- Executive producer: Claudio Biern Boyd
- Original screenplay: Claudio Biern Boyd
- Script coordinator: Rafael Soler
- Dialogue adaptor and voice director: Manuel Peiro
- Associate productors: José Luis Rodríguez, José Manuel Iglesias
- Audio mixed by: Oscar Gómez
- Editor: Soledad López
- Assistant editor: Carmen Ortega
- Special effects: Luis Castro
- Production assistant: Maria Aragón
- Production coordinator: Marisa Mato
- Sound technicians: Eduardo Fernandez, Alfonso Pino, Jose Esquirol, José Maria, San Mateo
- Recording studio: Exa, S.A.
- Laboratory: Fotofilm Madrid, S.A.

=== Japanese production ===
- Animation by: Nippon Animation
- Director: Fumio Kurokawa
- Producer: Koichi Motohashi
- Character design: Isamu Kumata
- Storyboards: Eiji Okabe, Fumio Kurokawa, Hiromitsu Morita, Katsumi Endo, Ko Suzuki, Shigeo Koshi, Shigeru Omachi, Toru Hagiwara
- Episode directors: Fumio Kurokawa, Eiji Okabe, Hiromitsu Morita, Toru Hagiwara, Yukio Okazaki
- Animation directors: Hirokazu Ishino, Hisatoshi Motoki, Takao Kanishi, Yukio Abe
- Music by: Shunsuke Kikuchi
- Theme songs by: Izumi Kobayashi
- Theme songs performed by: Keiko Han

=== English dub ===
- Music sub-publisher: Southern Pictures Music inc.
- Recorded and re-mixed at: Intersound Inc., Hollywood, USA
- English version directed and supervised by: Tom Wyner
- English adaptations by: Tom Wyner, Byrd Ehlmann, Cynthia Lake, Ben Martin

== Willy Fog 2 ==
Due to the success of Around the World with Willy Fog, BRB Internacional and Televisión Española, with animation by Wang Film Productions in Taiwan and Shanghai Morning Sun Animation in China, produced a sequel series titled Willy Fog 2. The series ran for 26 episodes, and consists of two separate serialized stories that are based on Verne's novels Journey to the Center of the Earth and Twenty Thousand Leagues Under the Seas.

== In other media ==
=== Home media ===
UK DVD cover

In 1986, Sony Video Software released the series on VHS in the United States.

From 3 October 1988 to 10 September 1990, select episodes were released in the United Kingdom on PAL VHS tapes by Video Collection International.

In 1995, BRB Internacional released three direct-to-video Willy Fog films – Around the World in 80 Days, Journey to the Center of the Earth and 20,000 Leagues Under the Sea – each one created by heavily editing both series from roughly 650 minutes each down to a truncated 75 minutes apiece. All three films were dubbed by Village Productions, who had previously dubbed the second series for the United Kingdom, and later reached the United States on DVD. Notably, the Village Productions dub for the first film was able to secure use of Intersound's English-language version of the theme tune.

In 2004, Revelation Films released all twenty-six episodes of Around the World with Willy Fog on DVD in the UK, across five Region-0-encoded discs. Extras included character profiles, a Jules Verne biography, and bonus episodes of Arthur! and the Square Knights of the Round Table and Dogtanian and the Three Muskehounds. In 2005, all five discs were collected in a complete series box set.

Around 2016, the English dub of all episodes of the series was uploaded to BRB Internacional's official YouTube channel.

=== Around the World with Willy Fog: The Musical ===
La vuelta al mundo de Willy Fog: El Musical poster

La vuelta al mundo de Willy Fog: El Musical was released in 2008 in celebration of the show's 25th anniversary in its home country of Spain. With the original cartoon soundtrack by the De Angelises, the theatrical performance featured live actors Jaume Ortonobas (Fog), Laura Toledo (Romy) and José Troncoso (Rigodon) in make-up and masks to replicate the anthropomorphic characters of the cartoon. Tico is represented as a puppet manipulated by Celia Vioque. Scripted by original series creator Claudio Biern Boyd and directed by Ricard Reguant, the musical ran twice a day in the Teatro Häagen-Dazs Calderón in Madrid from October 2008; although originally intended only to run until the end of the year, the show's success saw its run extended first until early February 2009, after which it proved so successful that it went on tour around the country until the end of the year.

=== Feature film ===
In November 2020, it was reported that a film based on the series was in development by Apolo Films and was slated for release in 2023. The film will be 3D computer-animated. As of 2025, no further information on the project has surfaced.
