= Claudio Rodríguez (actor) =

Spanish voice actor (1933–2019)

- Born: 31 August 1933; La Bóveda de Toro (Zamora), Spain
- Died: 4 December 2019 (aged 86)
- Occupation: Voice actor

Claudio Rodríguez (31 August 1933 – 4 December 2019) was a Spanish voice actor.

== Biography ==
He was born in 1933 in La Bóveda de Toro, Zamora. He worked at Radio Juventud de España with Luis del Olmo. He voiced Max von Sydow, Charlton Heston, Burt Lancaster, John Wayne, Anthony Quinn, Michael Gambon, Roger Moore, Paul Naschy, Omar Sharif, George C. Scott, Gary Oldman, Albus Dumbledore on Harry Potter saga and Willy Fog on Around the World with Willy Fog. He also appeared in TV series such as Más que amigos (1997) and El comisario (1998). On 4 December 2017 he was awarded for Premio Actúa de la Fundación AISGE. He died on 4 December 2019 at the age of 86.
