= La Bóveda de Toro =

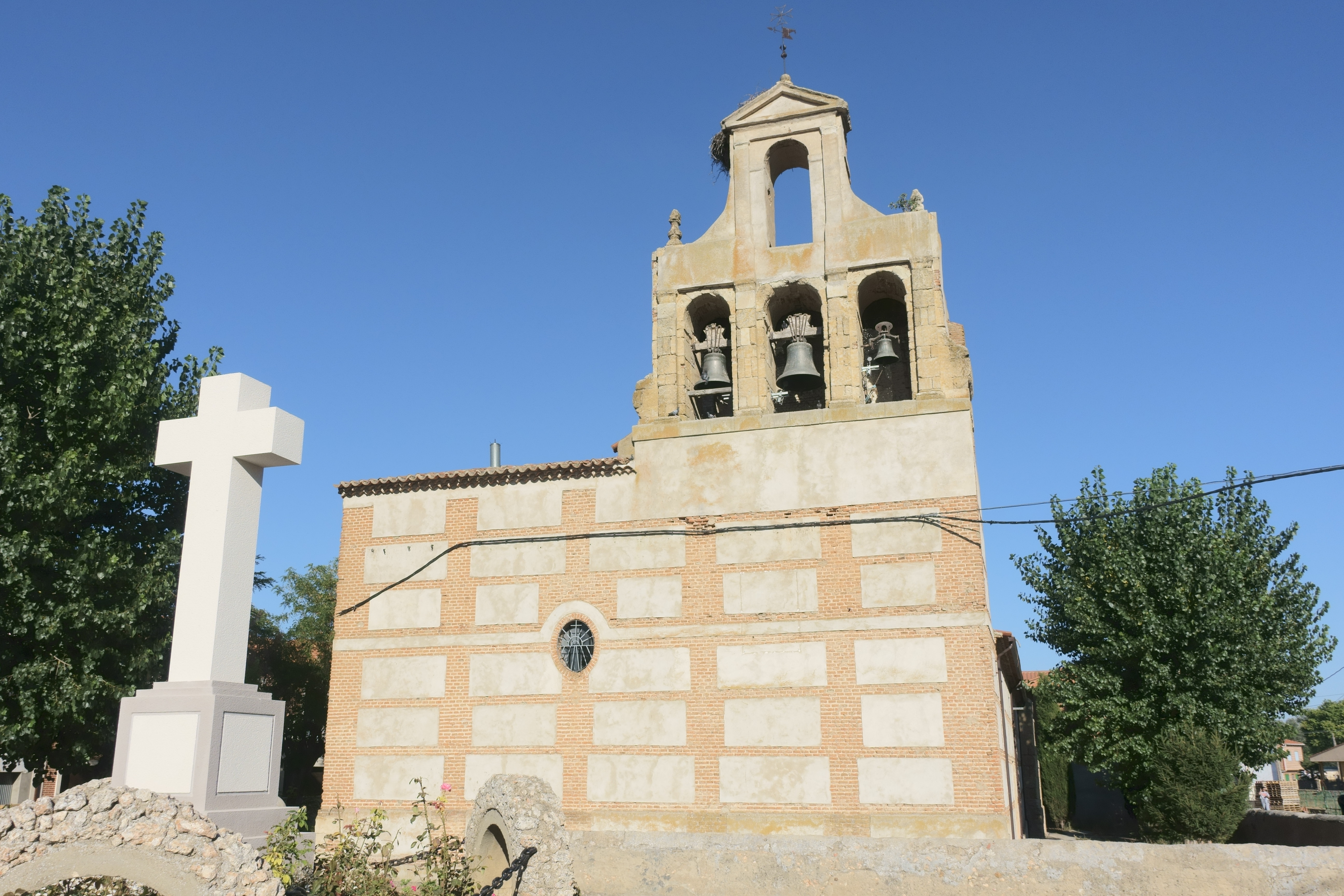

- Coat of arms

- Spain
- Coordinates: 41°21′N 5°24′W
- Country: Spain
- Autonomous community: Castile and León
- Province: Zamora
- Comarca: La Guareña

Government
  - Mayor: Francisco Benito Delgado

Area
  - Total: 59.45 km^{2} (22.95 sq mi)

Population (2025-01-01)
  - Total: 682
  - Density: 11.5/km^{2} (29.7/sq mi)
- Demonym: Bovedanos
- Time zone: UTC+1 (CET)
  - Summer (DST): UTC+2 (CEST)

La Bóveda de Toro is a municipality located in the province of Zamora, Castile and León, Spain.
