= The Untouchables of Elliot Mouse =

- Spanish: Los Intocables de Elliot Mouse
- Country of origin: Spain
- No. of episodes: 26

Production
- Running time: 30 min.
- Production companies: BRB Internacional; Antena 3 TV; CLT-UFA

Original release
- Network: Antena 3 (Spain); Channel 4 (UK)

The Untouchables of Elliot Mouse is a 1996–1997 26-episode half-hour television animated cartoon series loosely inspired by the real life Eliot Ness and his group of agents colloquially known as the Untouchables with their investigation into the real life gangster Al Capone. As with past adaptations this one does take some liberties with history. The series also parodies the violent atmosphere of Chicago during the Dry Law, as well as the old American films, their heroes and villains. The main characters in this series are four friendly mice: Elliot "Mouse", Gordon, Mr. Wilson, and Jack the Irishman, although there are also some cats and dogs.

== Plot ==
The citizens of "Cheesecago" are defenceless against "Al Catone's" mobsters until a few brave federal agents from the "Federal Mousehole of Investigation" headed by "Elliot Mouse" dare to take on the gangsters. In spite of their rivalry and continuous fights, they control gambling, shows, races and every business in town. They charge poor people and terrified traders with high taxes; they rob, and kidnap, but their biggest racket is in confiscating cheese and then deal with it illegally so that it fetches very high prices, often causing Cheesecago citizens to get ripped off.

== Episode ==
1. Cheesecago: City Without Law
2. Moony's Big Haul
3. The First Raids
4. The Cheese Trail
5. Doubles or Nothing
6. The Informer
7. A Day at the Races
8. Ma Wilson
9. The Perfect Holdup
10. The Greater the Fall
11. The Starlette
12. The Cheesecago Express
13. Escape from Catatraz
14. The Trap
15. The Code of Silence
16. Like Dog and Cat
17. The Public Enemy
18. A Present from Santa Mouse
19. The Loot goes Flying
20. The School of Crime
21. Their Days are Numbered
22. The Stolen Armstrong
23. Gems and Diamonds
24. While the City Sleeps
25. The Kidnapping
26. A Matter of Taxes

=== Special ===
- Happy 20th Anniversary to The Untouchables of Elliot Mouse!
- The Untouchables vs Al Catone (full film)

=== Characters ===
- Elliot Mouse
- Gordon
- Mr. Wilson
- Jack the Irishman
- Deborah
- Pierre
- The Cheese Paree Band
  - Louis (Trumpet), Artie (Drums), Jim (Double Bass) and Thelonious (Piano)
- Moony
- Robin
- Junior
- Tino Beradi
- Al Catone
- Rat Nitti
- Anselmi
- Scalise
- Dog Moran
- Kevin
- Sharp Nose
- Johnny
- Police Chief Stunned
- Mayor Big Bit Thompson
- Walter Sum

== Release ==
The first 9 episodes were released on DVD in the UK. Sometime in late 2013 to early 2014, the complete series of The Untouchables of Elliot Mouse was released on DVD in the UK.

== See also ==
- Dog City
- Who Framed Roger Rabbit
- The Untouchables (film)
- The Untouchables (book)
