= A Journey to the Centre of the Earth (1984 video game) =

- Developer: Mike Davis
- Publishers: OziSoft; CRL
- Designer: Mike Davis
- Platform: Commodore 64
- Release: EU: 1984
- Genres: Action-adventure, platform
- Mode: Single-player

A Journey to the Centre of the Earth is a side-scrolling action-adventure platform game published for the Commodore 64 in 1984 and re-released by CRL in 1985 under the title Journey.

== Plot ==
The introduction simply places the player in the role of an unnamed explorer who must delve into a subterranean labyrinth to locate 11 hidden treasures and return them to the surface.

== Gameplay ==
The game takes places in a massive, side-scrolling underground maze, throughout which is hidden 11 treasures. The goal is to find all of the treasures and return them to the surface. At the beginning of the game, the player character can run, jump, and climb, but the player can obtain items that will expand their abilities, most of which are required to beat the game. They include dynamite to blow open walls, umbrellas to protect against falling rocks, oxygen pills to breathe underwater, a gun to shoot enemies, and more. The player has only 8 inventory slots, and each item and treasure occupies one; furthermore, the player cannot jump when carrying 6 or more, and cannot climb when carrying 8. Consequently, the player must backtrack to the surface several times over the course of the game to unload their currently-held treasure. The player can also drop unneeded items at any time. Items can be selected with the number keys on the keyboard and are used with the joystick's fire button.

== Reception ==
A Journey to the Centre of the Earth received mostly positive reviews from the magazines of the day. C&VG gave it 8/10 for graphics, 8/10 for sound, 7/10 for value, and 8/10 for playability. Your Commodore gave it 5/10 for originality, 5/10 for playability, 3/10 for graphics, and 3/10 for value-for-money, finding the controls difficult but nevertheless concluding, "I recommend this game to anyone who wants a few hours of fun". Commodore Horizons gave it 5/8 for graphics, 5/8 for sonics, and 6/8 for gameplay, calling it an "agreeable arcade adventure . . . Unremarkable graphically; but good fun to play".
