= BRB Internacional =

Spanish TV producer, distributor and licensing agent

BRB Internacional S.A.U.
- The company's final logo used from 2013–2022
- Type: Sociedad Anónima
- Industry: Animation, production, distribution, licensing
- Founded: 1972; 54 years ago
- Founder: Tito Basto; José Rodriguez; Claudio Biern Boyd
- Defunct: 2022; 4 years ago
- Fate: Bankruptcy and liquidation
- Headquarters: Alcobendas, Madrid, Spain
- Area served: Worldwide
- Key people: Jose Luis Ucha Lliviria
- Total assets: Carlos Biern Enriquez
- Number of employees: 200
- Divisions: Apolo Films
- Website: brb.es Archive

BRB Internacional S.A.U was a Spanish licensing and production company of animated television series such as Around the World with Willy Fog, Dogtanian and the Three Muskehounds and The World of David the Gnome. At the end of January 2018, WildBrain, a leading digital kids' network and studio, has been appointed as the exclusive global manager of BRB Internacional's extensive catalogue of kids' content on YouTube. In 2022, the company closed after filing for bankruptcy. DeAPlaneta acquired the company's library in January 2023.

== History ==
The name BRB comes after its three founders: Títo Basto, José Rodriguez and Claudio Biern Boyd, who founded BRB Internacional SAU in 1972 as a merchandising agency in Spain where the company was headquartered in Alcobendas, Madrid. At first, BRB bought distribution rights in Spain to some of popular characters of foreign studios such as Hanna-Barbera and Warner Bros., short film and television series as The Pink Panther, Tom and Jerry, The Muppets and Charlie's Angels. In 1975, thanks to an agreement with the German company Merchandising München, BRB began licensing and distributing animation series both domestically and worldwide, including The Wood of Tallac, Banner and Flappy and Tom Sawyer, all anime series made by Nippon Animation Co., Ltd. in Japan, to start beginning BRB's long relationship with the Japanese animation studio.

After seeing a steady growth in this sector, BRB decided to start producing their own cartoon series, but delegating the whole animation process to other companies, starting with Nippon Animation with Ruy, the Little Cid, premiering in 1980 on Televisión Española (in Japan in 1984). Other series co-produced with Nippon Animation were Dogtanian and the Three Muskehounds (MBS and TBS 1981, TVE 1982), Around the World with Willy Fog and Football in Action (with Naranjito, the official mascot of 1982 FIFA World Cup). In 1985, after the increase of the Japanese yen due to the price asset bubble, BRB contracted Wang Films Productions in Taiwan their first international hit: The World of David the Gnome, which aired in the United States on Nickelodeon's Nick Jr. block two years later. The company continued to produce new cartoon series, including Iron Kid ("Eon Kid" in the United States), Suckers and Canimals.

In 2001, Banco Espírito Santo de Investimento acquired a 25% stake.

After that, they continued licensing successful foreign properties' rights in Spain including Pokémon, Pepsi, and The Pink Panther. Their most recent project by Screen 21 SA was Super Bernard, a theatrical film based on their short-form series Bernard, but it fell to bankruptcy during the mid-2010s. BRB had a film division called Apolo Films. The studio's only film was Dogtanian and the Three Muskehounds, a reboot of their Dogtanian series which was released in 2021.

In 2023, the company's catalog was acquired by DeAPlaneta Entertainment.

== Animated television programs ==
- Ruy, the Little Cid (1980) – co-production with Televisión Española, with animation by Nippon Animation (Japan).
- Dogtanian and the Three Muskehounds (1981) – with animation by Nippon Animation (Japan).
- Fútbol en acción (1981) – co-production with Televisión Española, with animation by Nippon Animation (Japan).
- Around the World with Willy Fog (1983) – co-production with Televisión Española, with animation by Nippon Animation (Japan).
- The World of David the Gnome (1985–1987) – co-production with Televisión Española.
- Wisdom of the Gnomes (1987–1988) – co-production with Televisión Española.
- Bobobobs (1988) – co-production with Televisió de Catalunya.
- The Return of Dogtanian (1989) – co-production with Televisión Española and Thames TV (UK) with animation by Wang Film Productions (Taiwan).
- A Thousand and One... Americas (1991) – co-production with Televisión Española.
- The Cobi Troupe (1991) – co-production with the Olympic Organizing Committee Barcelona'92.
- Sandokan (1992) - co-production with Telecinco
- Willy Fog 2 (1993) – co-production with Televisión Española, with animation by Wang Film Productions (Taiwan).
- Mort and Phil (1994) – co-production with Antena 3 TV, Ediciones B and RTL Television (Germany), with animation by Wang Film Productions (Taiwan).
- The Mozart Band (1995) – co-productions with Televisión Española and Marathon (France) and with animation by Wang Film Productions (Taiwan).
- The Untouchables of Elliot Mouse (1997) – co-production with Antena 3 TV and CLT-UFA (Germany).
- The New World of the Gnomes (1997) – co-production with Antena 3 TV, CLT-UFA (Germany) and Panini (Italy).
- Lights...Camera...Action! (AKA: "Super Models") (1998)
- Football Stories (1998)
- Teo – co-production with "Violeta Denou" (1999)
- Yolanda: Daughter of the Black Corsair (1999)
- Fantaghirò (1999)
- Toonimals! (2001)
- Nico (AKA: "Nicholas") (2001)
- Gladiator Academy (2002)
- Zipi y Zape (a.k.a. "Zip and Zap") (2002)
- Nouvelles aventures de l'homme invisible, Les ("The New Adventures of the Invisible Man") – co-production with Antefilms (now Moonscoop) (2005)
- Papawa (2005)
- Iron Kid – co-production with Manga Entertainment (2005)
- Bernard (2006)
- Angus and Cheryl (2006)
- The Imp (2006)
- Olympic Bernard (2008)
- Suckers (2010)
- Kambu (Korean: 깜부 미스터리 아일랜드) (2010)
- Canimals (2011)
- Zoobabu (2011)
- Khuda-Yana (2011)
- Bernard II (2012)
- Invizimals (2014)
- Mica (2014)
- Filly Funtasia (2019; started production in 2012 and ceased production on their part around 2016)
- Dogtanian, The Hero (cancelled)

== Animated films ==
- Dogtanian: The TV Special (1981) (TV film based on the first series)
- Dogtanian: One For All and All For One (1995)
- Willy Fog
  - Around the World in 80 Days (1995)
  - Journey to the Center of the Earth (1995)
  - 20,000 Leagues Under the Sea (1995)
- Sandokan: The Princess and the Pirate (1995)
- David the Gnome
  - The Tiny Little World of David the Gnome (1995)
  - The Gnomes' Great Adventure (1995 redub)
  - The Gnomes' Amazing Journeys (1997)
  - The Gnomes' Adventures in the Snow (1997)
- Music For Your Eyes By The Mozart Band (1997)
- Elliot Mouse: The Untouchables vs. Al Catone (1998)
- Yolanda: Secret of the Black Rose (2000)
- Fantaghirò: Quest for the Kuorum (2000)
- Football Stories: The Official Rules of Football (2001)
- Toonimals: Wild Records! The Greatest Animal Records (2001)
- Ruy the Little Cid (2004)
- Nicholas (or Nico): The TV Movie (2005)
- Gladiator Academy: The Movie (2005)
- The Adventures of Zip and Zap: Meet the Monsters (2005)

== Live-action films ==
- La princesa de Kaphurtala
- Marqués mendigo
- Un difunto, seis mujeres y un taller
- Atropello
- Dentro del Paraiso
- Los recuerdos de Alicia
- Ambiciones'

== Live-action TV ==
- Los Sabios ("The Wise Ones"), in Televisión Española (using characters and animation from the anime series Mīmu Iro Iro Yume no Tabi)
- ¿Y tú bailas? ("And You Dance?", 1998), in Telecinco
- Tentaciones ("Temptations"), in Antena 3
- Gran Splash ("Great Splash"), in Televisión Española
- Pokemanía, in Telecinco (using characters and animation from Pokémon)
- La hora animada ("Animated Hour")

== Feature films ==
- Dogtanian and the Three Muskehounds (2021)
- Around the World with Willy Fog (cancelled)
- The Gnomes (cancelled)
- Super Bernard (cancelled)

== Awards ==
- BEST EUROPEAN PRODUCER-Nomination – CARTOON FORUM 2009
- Best Agent of the Year (2009) for Cartoon Network Enterprises
- Best Agent of the Year (2008) for Cartoon Network Enterprises
- Nominated for "Best producer of the Year" Kidscreen magazine (2007)
- Gran Vía Award (2008), for "Around the World with Willy Fog: The Musical"
