= Gnome =

Mythological creature

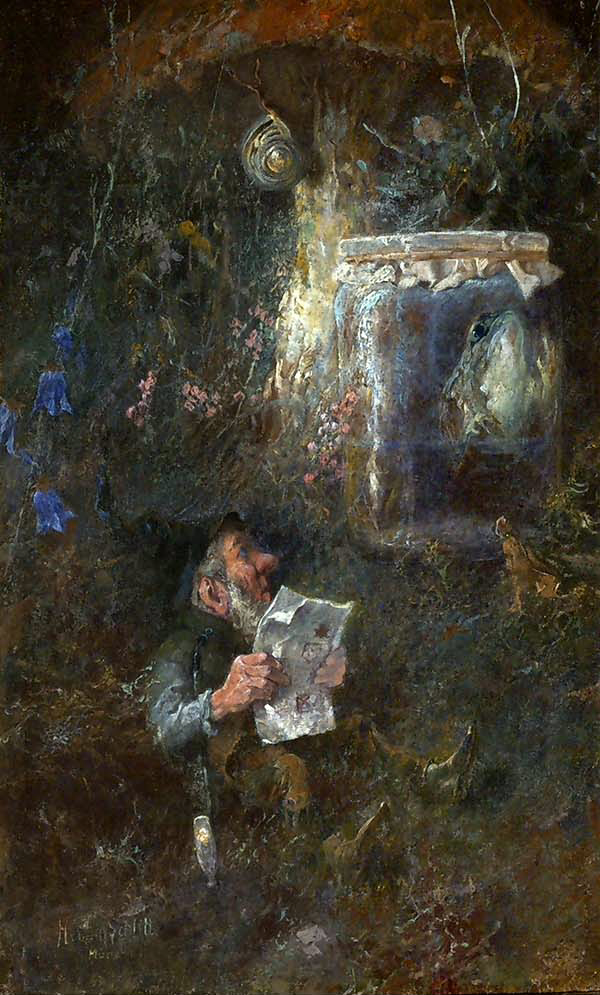
- Gnom mit Zeitung und Tabakspfeife (English: Gnome with newspaper and tobacco pipe) by Heinrich Schlitt (1923)

Creature information
- Grouping: Diminutive spirit
- Folklore: Renaissance

Origin
- First attested: 16th century

A gnome (/noʊm/) is a mythological creature and diminutive spirit in Renaissance magic and alchemy, introduced by the Swiss physician and alchemist Paracelsus in the 16th century, and widely adopted by authors, including those of modern fantasy literature. They are typically depicted as small humanoids who live underground. Gnome characteristics are reinterpreted to suit various storytellers and artists.

Paracelsus's gnome is recognized to have derived from the German miners' legend about Bergmännlein or dæmon metallicus, the "metallurgical or mineralogical demon", according to Georg Agricola (1530), also called virunculus montanos (literal Latinization of Bergmännlein = "mountain manikin") by Agricola in a later work (1549), and described by other names such as cobeli (sing. cobelus; Latinization of German Kobel). Agricola recorded that according to the legends of that profession, these mining spirits acted as miming and laughing pranksters who sometimes threw pebbles at miners, but could also reward them by depositing a rich vein of silver ore.

Paracelsus also called his gnomes occasionally by these names (Bergmännlein, etc.) in the German publications of his work (1567). Paracelsus claimed gnomes measured 2 spans (18 inches) in height, whereas Agricola had them to be 3 dodrans (3 spans, 27 inches) tall.

The name of the element cobalt descends from kobelt, a 16th century German miners' term for unwanted ore (cobalt-zinc ore, or possibly the noxious cobaltite and smaltite), related as mischief perpetrated by the gnome Kobel (Note: Or Latin:cobelus, Greek form cobelos.) (cf. § cobalt ore). This Kobel is a synonym of Bergmännlein, technically not the same as kobold, but there is confusion or conflation between them.

The terms Bergmännlein/Bergmännchen or Berggeist are often used in German publications as the generic, overall term for the mine spirits told in "miners' legends" (Bergmannssage). (Note: cf. the compilation Heilfurth & Greverus (1967) and its explanatory, pp. 56–58, 189–190 on past anthologies by Wrubel (1883) using "Berggeist" as category, and Stötzel (1936) essentially following but renaming the category as "Bergmännchen".)

Lawn ornaments crafted as gnomes were introduced during the 19th century, growing in popularity during the 20th century as garden gnomes.

== Etymology ==
The word comes from Renaissance Latin gnomus, gnomos, (pl. gnomi (Note: = loc. cit. apud OED.)) which first appears in A Book on Nymphs, Sylphs, Pygmies, and Salamanders, and on the Other Spirits by Paracelsus, published posthumously in Nysa in 1566. (Note: And again in the Johannes Huser edition of 1589–1591 from an autograph by Paracelsus.)

The term may be an original invention of Paracelsus, possibly deriving the term from Latin *gēnomos, itself representing a Greek *γηνόμος, approximated by "*gē-nomos", literally "earth-dweller". This is characterized by the Oxford English Dictionary (OED) as a case of "blunder", presumably referring to the omission of the ē to arrive at gnomus. However, this conjectural derivation is not substantiated by any known prior attestation in literature, (Note: The asterisk(*) at the beginnings of the presumed Latin or Greek words indicates linguistic reconstruction.) and one commentator suggests the truth will never be known, short of a discovery of correspondence from the author. (Note: A rhetorical comparison is made to Murray Gell-Mann who did write to the Oxford English Dictionary regarding the word origin of "quark".)

== Paracelsus ==
Paracelsus uses Gnomi as a synonym of Pygmæi and classifies them as earth elementals. He describes them as two spans tall. (Note: If 1 span is taken to be 9 inches, 2 spans equal 1.5 feet. Cf. below where Agricola gives 3 dodrans (equal to 3 spans, i.e., 2.25 feet).) They are able to move through solid earth, as easily as humans move through air, and hence described as being like a "spirit". However the elementals eat, drink and talk (like humans), distinguishing them from spirits. (Note: Them being "taciturn" according to C. S. Lewis appears to be a misattribution, for Paracelsus states: "The mountain manikins [gnomes] are endowed with speech like the nymphs [undines, water], and the vulcans [salamanders, fire] speak nothing, yet they can speak but roughly and rarely". Hartmann also seems to misstate the "spirits of the woods" as saying nothing, since this answers to "sylvestres" of the forests, given as an alternate name sylphs, or air spirits.)

According to Paracelsus's views, the so-called dwarf (German: Zwerg, Zwerglein) is merely monstra (deformities) of the earth spirit gnome. (Note: Sigerist's translation: "The giants come from the forest people and the dwarfs from the earth manikins. They are monstra like the sirens from the nymphs. Thus these beings are born". The Latin term "monstra" is used as is in the 1567 German edition also. However, this is not "monster" in the common modern sense, and explained as the "misbegotten" (Mißgeburten) in one reference handbook in its entry on "Paracelsus".)

Note that Paracelsus also frequently resorts to circumlocutions like "mountain people" (Bergleute) or "mountain manikins" ("Bergmänlein" [sic]) to denote the gnomi in the German edition (1567).

== Precursors ==
There was a belief in early modern Germany about beings that lurked in the mines, known as Bergmännlein (var. Bergmännlin, Bergmänngen), equatable to what Paracelsus called "gnomes". Paracelsus's contemporary, Georgius Agricola, being a supervisor of mines, collected his well-versed knowledge of this mythical being in his monograph, De amantibus subterraneis (recté De animantibus subterraneis, 1549). The (corrected) title suggests the subject to be "subterranean animate beings". It was regarded as a treatise on the "Mountain spirit" (Berggeist by the Brothers Grimm, in Deutsche Sagen. (Note: Grimms, DW; cf. Deutsches Wörterbuch "kobel".))

Agricola is the earliest and probably most reliable source on Berggeist, then known as Bergmännlein, etc. Agricola's contemporary Johannes Mathesius, a Lutheran reformist theologian, in Sarepta Oder Bergpostill (1562) uses these various mine-lore terminology in his German sermon, so that the noxious ore which Agricola called cadmia is clarified as that which German miners called cobelt (also kobelt, cobalt), (Note: This clarification (identification of cadmia's real German form) is possible through Agricola's publications too, but is more complicated. In the text itself he write that the ore in Latin cadmia was called in German cobaltus, which is of course Latinized. The pure German form kobelt can be looked up in the appended glossary ("Cadmia metallica Kobelt"), or by tabulating a comparison with the contemporary German translations which the Hoovers have done.) and a demon the Germans called kobel was held responsible for the mischief of its existence, according to the preacher. The kobel demon was also blamed for the "hipomane" [sic] or horse's poison (cf. hippomanes, § Rosenkranz mine, Annaberg). (Note: Mathesius (1652), quoted in English by the Hoovers, excerpted by Wothers.) (Note: Mathesius apparently used gütlein also.) (Note: The Hoovers in their translation of Agricola echo the opinion that kobalt has this name because the kobel demon was blamed for it. Cf. also Johann Beckmann (1752). See § Cobalt ore for further details on the "cobalt" etymology.)

== Agricola ==
Georgius Agricola, in his earlier Latin work Bermanus, sive, de re metallica (first printed 1530, reprinted 1546, etc.), did delve into a limited discussion on the "metallurgical or mine demon" (dæmon metallicus) (Note: The main text itself discusses "dæmon" in relation to "metallum" but the set phrase "dæmon metallicus" occurs in the end gloss.) touching on the "Corona rosacea" mine disaster (cf. § Rosenkranz mine, Annaberg) and the framework of Psellosian demonology (cf. § Demonology). A Latin-German gloss in later editions identify the being he called daemon metallicus as code for German Bergmännlein (Das bergmenlin [sic], "mountain manikin", general term for earth spirit or mine spirit).

Much more details were presented in Agricola's later Latin work De animantibus subterraneis (1549) (cf. § De animantibus subterraneis), (Note: Excerpted translation footnoted in President and Mrs. Hoover (1912)'s translation of De re metallica, requoted by Wothers,) known as a monograph on Berggeist ("mountain spirit") in the Grimms' Deutsche Sagen. The equivalent German appellations of the demons/spirits were made available by the subsequent gloss published 1563. (Note: Gloss titled Appellationes quadrupedum, insectorum, volucrium, piscium (1563), quote: "Daemon subterraneus.. bergmenlein/kobel/guttel". See full quote with opposite translation, below.) Agricola here refers to the "gnome/mine spirit" by a variety of other terms and phrases, such as virunuculus montanos ("mountain manikin", i.e., German: Bergmännlein) or Greek/Latin cobelos/cobelus (German: kobel) .

The pertinent gloss, also quoted by Jacob Grimm, (Note: Grimm's annotation to his Deutsche Mythologie. He states the source as the 1657 edition de re metall. libri XII which is misleading since it (as quoted from below) is an omnibus edition including selections from De animantibus, and Grimm is actually quoting the appended gloss to De animantibus, not De re metallica.) states that the more ferocious of the "underground demons" (daemon subterraneus) were called in German Berg-Teufel or "mountain-devil", while the milder ones were called Bergmännlein, Kobel, Güttel. (Note: (bergmenlein, kobel, guttel [sic].)

A different entry in the gloss reveals that the "metallurgical demon" (daemon metallicus) or Bergmännlein is somehow responsible for leaving a rich vein of ore (fundige zech), specifically a rich vein of silver. (Note: "Latin: quantumvis argento fœcundam"(abundant and rich silver) (Note: Cf. also paraphrase by Ludovico Maria Sinistrari (1876) De la démonalite et des animaux incubes et succubes translated into French.)

=== De animantibus subterraneis ===
According to Agricola in De animantibus subterraneis (1549), these mountain-cave demons were called by the same name, cobalos, in both Greek (i.e. kobalos) and German (i.e. kobel (Note: The German appellations are given in the gloss to De animantibus, as already explained.) var. kobal (Note: There is the German form Kobalen, the -en presumably a definite article suffix. This term applies to a mountain-cave demon, answering to Latin Cobali, virunculi montani (used here by Agricola), Berggeister, gnome, and Kobold, according to German linguist Paul Kretschmer.)). The Latin form is appended in the margin (pl. cobali, sing. cobalus). They earned such names due to their alleged habits of aping or mimicking humans. They have the penchant to laugh, and pretend to act like they are doing something meaningful, without actually accomplishing anything.

In classical Greek literature, kobalos (κόβαλος) refers to an "impudent rogue", (Note: Grimm & Stallybrass tr. (1883), p. 500: "rogue"; Grimm (1875), pp. 415–416: "Schalk".) or in more modern parlance, "joker" or "trickster". The chemist J. W. Mellor (1935) had suggested "mime". (Note: Mellor (1935) "κόβαλος, a mine [sic]", misprint corrected as "kobalos, mime" by Taylor.)

These were otherwise called the virunculos montanos, literally translatable into German as Bergmännlein, or English as "mountain manikin" (Note: Or "mountain dwarf") (Note: Latin virunculos is vir "man" suffixed with diminutive -unculos, -unculus, hence equal to German diminutive of Mann, i.e., Männlein, Männchen.) (Note: Athanasius Kircher also gives Bergmänlin =Bergmanlein as German equivalent. Mundus Subterraneus, Lib. VIII, sect. 4, cap. 4, p. 123.) due to their small stature (about 2 feet). (Note: Agricola specifies "nempe nani tres dodrantes longi" where dodrans glosses as "three-quarters of a foot", i.e., "dwarf 2.25 feet tall". The Hoovers' translation converts to "about 2 feet".) They had the appearance of old age, and dressed like miners, (Note: Here metallicorum is glossed as "miner", even though the old translation renders as "metal [re]finers".) in laced/filleted shirt (Note: The dated rendition gives "laced petticoat" while the Hoovers gave "filleted garment" for Latin vittatus (vitta "band, ribbon").) (Note: indusium or "laced petticoat" in the old translation could refers to either an upper or lower garment, thus the Hoovers give "garment", but here probably in the sense of shirt, not skirt, cf. Bergmännlein wearing "white shirt" in Rollenhagen's poem Froschmäuseler, noted by Grimm.) and leather apron around the loins. Although they may pelt miners with gravel/pebbles (Note: glareis jacessant.) they did no real harm, unless they were first provoked.

Agricola goes on to add there are similar to the beings which the Germans called Guteli (singular: Gutelos; German: Gütel, var. Güttgen), which are amicable demons that are rarely seen, since they have business at their home taking care of livestock. (Note: iumentum can mean cattle, etc., though Lavater tr. Harris gives "horses".) A Gütel or Güttel is elsewhere explained as not necessarily a mountain spirit, but more generic, and may haunt forests and fields. (Note: (East Central German) Gütel, Güttel purportedly diminutives of "God", as it referred to fetish figurines, and as such ostensibly identifiable with kobold (as figurines).) (Note: Grimm cites Václav Hanka's "Old" Bohemian glosses, 79^{b} as giving gitulius for kobolt, followed by alpinus glossed as tatrman. Grimm makes the point that all these have a "doll" or "puppet" connotation, since alphinus was the term for a chess piece (the queen, apparently also called "the fool"), and tatrman is attested with the usage "guiding him with strings".) The Hoovers render these as "goblins".

Agricola finally adds these resemble the Trullis (trolls?) as they are called especially by the Swedes, (Note: A troll is obviously rather generic. Lecouteux gives Swedish: gruvrå.) said to shapeshift into the guise of human males and females, and sometimes made to serve men.

==== Rosenkranz mine, Annaberg ====
Purportedly a mountain demon incident caused 12 fatalities at a mine named Rosenkrans at Anneberg (Note: As also reported by Olaus Magnus, discussed below.) or rather Rosenkranz or Rosenkrone (Latin: Corona Rosacea) at Annaberg-Buchholz, in the Ore Mountains (German: Erzgebirge) in Saxony. The demon took on the guise of the horse, and killed the twelve men with its breath, according to Agricola. (Note: Latin: "Flatum vero emittebat ex rictu" Apparently omitted by the Hoovers, Wothers provides his own translation that it "only with his breath killed more than twelve labourers" and comments on the demon appearing in horse's guise, and issuing poison breath out of its mouth. Cf. German: Anhauch.) (Note: Calmet states "spirit in the shape of a spirited, snorting horse", citing a different title, "Geo. Agricola, de Mineral. Subterran., p. 504".)

==== Demonology ====
Agricola has a passage in Bermanus which is quoted by a modern scholar as relevant to the study of his contemporary Paracelsus. The passage contains the line (Note: Just below mention of the mine "Corona rosacea", writes: "Eius generis demonum, quod in metallis esse solet, inter reliqua, sex (6) enim numerat, Psellus mentionem fecit, ... cæteris peius" ("Psellus mentions this type of demon, which is usually found in metals, among the rest, for they number six, ... worse than the rest").) basically repeated by Olaus, as "there exist in ore-bearing regions six kinds of demon more malicious than the rest".

This is probably misstated or misleading, since Bermanus cites Psellus, who devised a classification of six demon classes, where clearly it is not all six, but just the fifth class of subterranean demons which are relevant to mining.

This demon class is also equatable to Agricola's Cobali and Getuli (recte "Guteli") (Note: "Guteli" was Agricola's spelling, thus "Getuli" is not faithful to it. However, gitulius (var. getulius, gaetulius) as a synonym of kobolt is attested, so the learned Englishmen were perhaps providing the correct standard Latin.) according to commentators.

It has also been noted that Agricola distinguished the "mountain devil", exemplified by Rübezahl with the small-statured Bergmännlein; although the popular notion was that Rübezahl was indeed lord of the gnomes, as told in folktales around the Giant Mountains (German: Riesengibirge) region in Silesia, published by 18th century folktale collector Musäus.

Agricola explaining that the "mine demon" dæmon metallicus or Bergmenlin somehow deposited "rich mines" was mentioned above.

==== Cobalt ore ====
Agricola knew of certain noxious unwanted ores the German miners called kobelt, though he generally referred to it by the Greek term, cadmia. This cadmia/kobelt has conventionally been interpreted as referring to cobalt–zinc ore, but Agricola ascribes to it corrosive dangers to the miners' feet, so modern commentators have suggested a better candidate to be smaltite, a cobalt and nickel arsenide mixture which presents corrosive properties. This ore, which defied being smelted by the metallurgy of that time, may also have been cobaltite, composed of cobalt, arsenic, and sulfur.

The presence of this nuisance ore kobelt was blamed on the similar-sounding kobel mine spirits, as Mathesius noted in his preaching. The inferred etymology of kobelt deriving from kobel, which Mathesius does not quite elocute, was explicitly articulated by Johannes Beckmann in Beiträge zur Geschichte der Erfindungen (translated into English as The History of Inventions, discoveries and origins, 1797).

The kobel spirit that was possibly the namesake of the ore is characterized as a "gnome or a goblin" by science writer Philip Ball. (Note: The trend of 21st century scholarship seems to be to categorize the kobel, etc. as "gnome". Peter Wothers titles his section on discussion on cobalt as "Gnomes and Goblins". While Wothers's Fig. 24 (= the fig. under § Olaus Magnus) labels the creature as "mining demon", Britannica Online labels it as "gnome".) However, 20th century dictionaries had suggested derivation from Kobold, for example, Webster's in 1911 which did not distinguish kobel from Kobold and lumped them together, and the OED which conjectured that the ore kobolt and the spirit kobolt/Kobold was the same word. An alternative etymology deriving kobolt ore from Kübel, a type of bucket mentioned by Agricola, has been suggested by Karl Müller-Fraureuth. (Note: Agricola mentions the bucket repeatedly, in Latin as modulus, glossed as Kobel. Cf. also Grimm, "Kobel", "Köbel" and "Kübel", Deutsches Wörterbuch, Vol. 5.) Peter Wothers suggests that cobalt could derive (without connection to Agricola) from cobathia for noxious smoke.

=== Olaus Magnus ===
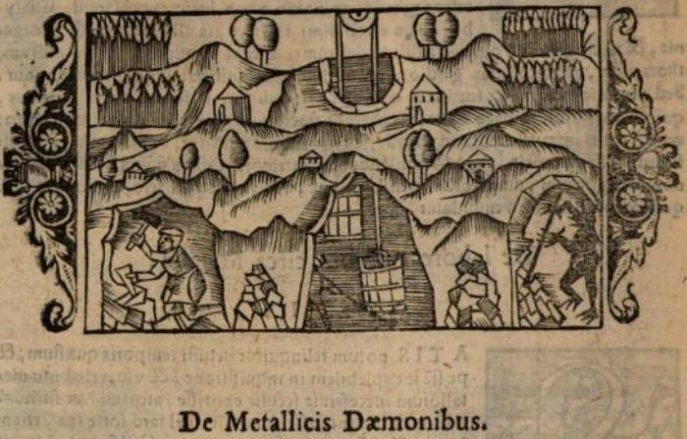
Demons in the mine. Olaus Magnus, Historia de gentibus septentrionalibus

The erudite Swedish Olaus Magnus in his Historia de Gentibus Septentrionalibus (1555) also provides a chapter on "demons in the mines". Although Olaus uses the term "demon" (daemon) and not the uninvented coinage "gnome", the accompanying woodcut he provided (reproduced here) has been represented as "gnome" in modern reference sources. (Note: Olaus appears to be quoting Munsterus (Münster), identified as author of Cosmographia, i.e., Sebastian Münster the cartographer. He names Agricola apparently as an additional authority for confirmation. But much material found in Olaus are actually to be found in Agricola, as explained in several notes above.)

=== Praetorius ===
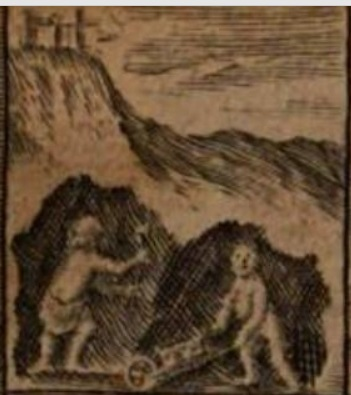
Bergmännerlein, Wights, and Subterraneans (Unter-Irrdische). Engraving by Thomas Cross, Sr. (fl. 1632–1682), frontispiece to Praetorius (1668) [1666] Anthropodemus Plutonicus.

Johannes Praetorius in Anthropodemus Plutonicus (1666) devotes a chapter of considerable length to the beings he calls Bergmännrigen or Erdleute "earth people", and follows Agricola to a large extent. Thus he considers earth spirits to be of two types, one more evil and sinister looking, the other more benevolent and known as Bergmännlein (lit. 'little mountain man') or Kobolde. He gives the measurement of what he calls the Bergmännrigen at "drey viertel einer Ellen lang", perhaps shy of one and a half feet. (Note: Williams calculates to "half a foot" which must be off, perhaps 3/4 misread as 1/4.)

The mention of kobolde here as a name for the underground spirit is an unresolved contradiction to Praetorius dedicating a wholly separate chapter on the kobold as house sprite with a separate frontispiece art labeled "8. Haußmänner/Kobolde/Gütgen" for the house spirits.

== Folklore examples ==
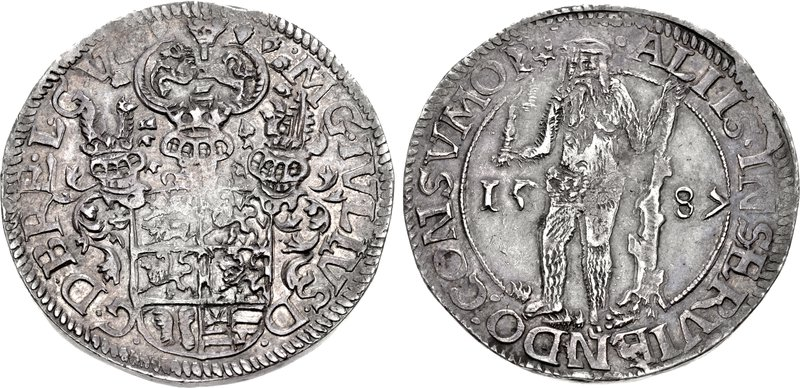
Silver Thaler coin. Goslar mint. Dated 1587

The anecdote of the "Rosenkranz" mine localized in Saxony was already given above in § Rosenkranz mine, Annaberg. This and other near modern attestations are given in Wolfersdorf's anthology (1968) above.

German lore regarding gnomes or Berggeister (mine spirits) depicts them as beneficial creatures, at least if they are treated respectfully, and lead miners to rich veins of ore. (Note: Scott actually says these are "kobolds" which are types of gnomes.)

=== Bergmönch of Harz and mine light ===
The silver thaler minted by Duke Henry the Younger of Brunswick-Wolfenbüttel (first minted 1539) which features a "wild man" (see image) was seen to reassert his claim of complete ownership of the local silver and forest resources of the Harz Mountains, probably depicting the supernatural that miners believed led them to the whereabouts of silver ore. Even though the wild man above surface could be a vague supernatural guide, it is pointed out that it must be the Berggeist burrowing underground which guides miners to exact spots. In the Harz area, it is a Bergmönch or "mountain monk" who uses the so-called "mining light" (Grubenlicht or Geleucht) to guide miners to their quarry or to their exit. Contemporary writing by the priest Hardanus Hake in his Bergchronik (1583) records the belief that when the Walkenried Abbey operated the mining operation at Wildemann, it was actually being built and run by the Daemon Metallicus or Bergleute, Bergmännlein (i.e. gnomes) that assumed the form of monks, and even before Hake, Agricola (1666) had been the first to write of a giant clad in a monk's habit roaming the Ore Mountains. But the term Bergmönch did not come into usage until later, around the mid-17th century. The term Bergmönch was prevalent around Harz and Ore Mountains, but also in use in Transylvania and Graubünden (Grisons, Switzerland).

The lantern he holds is apparently an ignited lump of tallow (Unschlitt). It is also said that the Bergmönch was originally a mine supervisor who begged God to let him continue oversight of mines after death. If ignored it will angrily appear in its giant true form, with eyes as large as cartwheels, his silver lantern measuring a German bushel or Scheffel. (Note: The modern US and imperial bushels are about 8 gallons or 35–36 liters. The German bushel or Scheffel historically was a widely differing unit of dry volume, depending on region; it was around 50 liters in many areas, but given as 310 odd liters in the Duchy of Braunschweig.)

=== Communication through noises ===
Nineteenth-century miners in Bohemia and Hungary reported hearing knocking in the mines. The mining trade there interpreted such noises as warnings from the kobolds to not go in that direction. Although the Hungarian (or Czech) term was not given by the informant, and called "kobolds" of these mines, they were stated as the equivalents of the Berggeist of the Germans. (Note: Mr. Kalodzy, teacher at the Hungarian Mining School, cited by spiritualist Emma Hardinge Britten.)

Nineteenth-century German miners also talked of the Berggeist, who appeared as small black men, scouting ahead of miners with a hammer, and with their banging sound indicating whether veins of ore, or breaks in the veins called 'faults', and the more knocks, the richer the vein lay ahead. (Note: William Howitt, London Spiritual Magazine, cited by Britten.)

There is also a experiential report of a German mine sprite communicating residents and visiting their house (cf. Kobold § Visitors from mines).

=== Switzerland ===
The gnomes of Swiss folklore are also associated with riches of the mines. They are said to have caused the landslide that destroyed the Swiss village of Plurs in 1618 – the villagers had become wealthy from a local gold mine created by the gnomes, who poured liquid gold down into a vein for the benefit of humans, and were corrupted by this newfound prosperity, which greatly offended the gnomes.

== Folkloristics ==
Grimm discusses the Bergmännlein somewhat under the subsection of Dwarfs (Zwerge), arguing that the dwarf's Nebelkappe (known as Tarnkappe in the Nibelungenlied) slipped from being known as a cape or cloak covering the body in earlier times, into being thought of as caps or head coverings in the post-medieval era. As an example, he cites the Bergmännlein wearing a pointed hat, according to Rollenhagen's poem Froschmeuseler. (Note: In the published version of Rollenhagen's work, "Bergmännlein" is used in the index, but the verses themselves read: "Funden sich auf dem Berg beysammen Der kleiner Männlein ohne Nahmen,/ In weissen Hemdlein, spitzgen Kappen,/ Als man gewohnt an den Bergknappen".)

As can be glimpsed by this example, the approach of Grimm's "Mythologische Schule" is to regard the lore of the various männlein or specifically Bergmännlein as essentially derivatives of the Zwerge/dvergr of pagan Germanic mythologies. (Note: Baba (2019)'s specific mention of "Bergmännlein" is limited to saying they appear as characters in two tales from the collection of Karl Müllenhoff, at p. 26. She discusses near synonyms in Grimm's Deutsche Mytholgie, namely, männlein being used as circumlocution for dwarf (Zwerg), p. 26, and Zwerg being a Berggeist pp. 101, 103; or equivalent to a mine spirit, p. 125, and deriving from the Germanic dvergr p. 134. As a reminder, Agricola's monograph on "mountain elves" was considered a book on Berggeist in the Grimms' DS.)

In the 1960s there developed a general controversy between this "mythological school" and its opponents over how to interpret the so-called "miner's legends". What sparked the controversy was not over the Bergmännlein type tale per se, but over Grimms' "Three Miners of Kuttenberg", (Note: "Die drei Bergleute im Kuttenberg", Deutsche Sagen, No. 1) who are trapped underground but supernaturally maintain longevity through prayer. Siegfried Kube (1960) argued the tale was based on ancient mythology, i.e., pagan alpine worship. (Note: Yoshida (2008), p. 185 apud Baba (2009), pp. 101–102.) This was countered by Wolfgang Brückner (1961) who regarded the tale as inspired by medieval Catholic notion of the purgatory. (Note: Yoshida (2008), pp. 179–181 apud Baba (2009), p. 102.) Whereas Ina-Maria Greverus (1962), presented yet a different view, that it was not based on organized church doctrine, but a world-view and faith in the miner's unique microcosm.

Greverus at least in her 1962 piece, centered her argument on the Berggeist (instead of Bergmännlein). Grimm also uses the Berggeist apparently as a type of Zwerg, (Note: e.g., the dancing berggeister of DS No. 298.) but there has been issued a caveat that the meaning of the term Berggeist according to Grimm may not necessarily coincide with the meaning used by the proletarian Greverus. Gerhard Heilfurth and Greverus's Bergbau und Bergmann (1967) amply discuss the Bergmännlein.

The collection of tales under the classification of "Berggeist" was already anticipated as far back as Friedrich Wrubel (1883). (Note: Ozawa (1970), Review of Gerhard Heilfurth, co-written with Greverus (1967).) Later Franz Kirnbauer published Bergmanns-Sagen (1954), a collection of miner's legends which basically adopted Wrubel's four-part classification, except Wrubel's Part 2 was retitled as one about "Bergmännlein".

In Karl Müllenhoff's anthology (1845), legends No. 443 Das Glück der Grafen Ranzau and No. 444 Josias Ranzaus gefeites Schwert feature the Bergmännlein-männchen or its female form Bergfräuchen.

Other collected works also bear "Berggeist-sagen" in the title, such as the collection of legends in Lower Saxony by Wolfersdorf (1968).

== Cultural references ==
=== In Romanticism and modern fairy tales ===
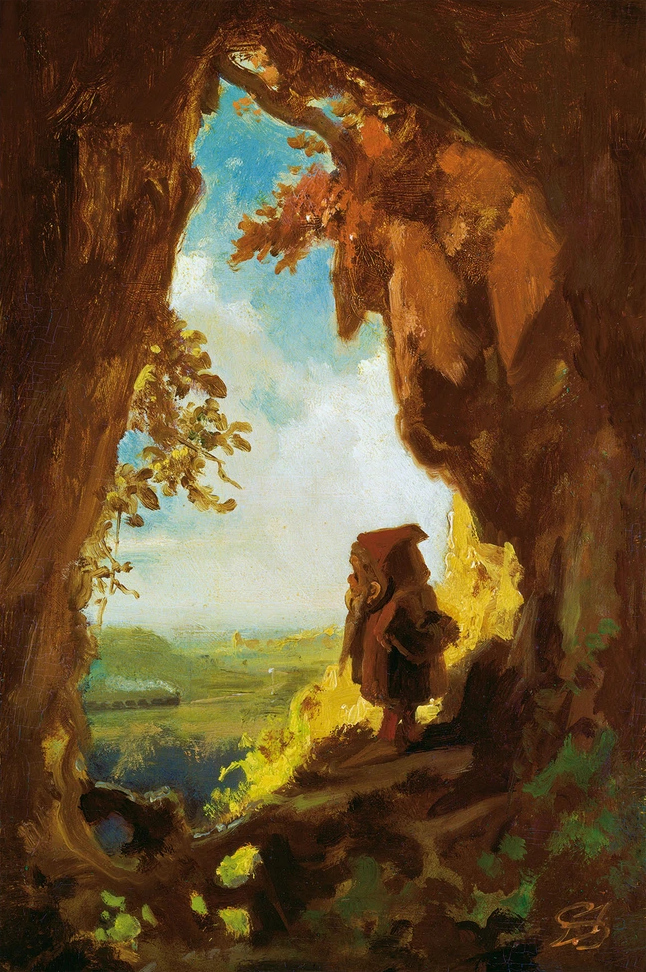
Gnome Watching Railway Train, Carl Spitzweg, 1848

The English word is attested from the early 18th century. Gnomes are used in Alexander Pope's "The Rape of the Lock". The creatures from this mock-epic are small, celestial creatures that were prudish women in their past lives, and now spend all of eternity looking out for prudish women (in parallel to the guardian angels in Catholic belief). Other uses of the term gnome remain obscure until the early 19th century, when it is taken up by authors of Romanticist collections of fairy tales and becomes mostly synonymous with the older word goblin.

Pope's stated source, the 1670 French satire Comte de Gabalis by Nicolas-Pierre-Henri de Montfaucon de Villars, the abbot of Villars, describes gnomes as such:

The Earth is filled almost to the center with Gnomes or Pharyes, a people of small stature, the guardians of treasures, of mines, and of precious stones. They are ingenious, friends of men, and easie to be commandded. They furnish the children of the Sages with as much money, as they have need of; and never ask any other reward of their services, than the glory of being commanded. The Gnomides or wives of these Gnomes or Pharyes, are little, but very handsom; and their habit marvellously curious.

De Villars used the term gnomide to refer to female gnomes (often "gnomid" in English translations). Modern fiction instead uses the word "gnomess" to refer to female gnomes.

In 19th-century fiction, the chthonic gnome became a sort of antithesis to the more airy or luminous fairy. Nathaniel Hawthorne in Twice-Told Tales (1837) contrasts the two in "Small enough to be king of the fairies, and ugly enough to be king of the gnomes" (cited after OED). Similarly, gnomes are contrasted to elves, as in William Cullen Bryant's Little People of the Snow (1877), which has "let us have a tale of elves that ride by night, with jingling reins, or gnomes of the mine" (cited after OED).

The Russian composer Mussorgsky produced a movement in his work Pictures at an Exhibition, (1874) named "Gnomus" (Latin for "The Gnome"). It is written to sound as if a gnome is moving about.

Franz Hartmann in 1895 satirized materialism in an allegorical tale entitled Unter den Gnomen im Untersberg. The English translation appeared in 1896 as Among the Gnomes: An Occult Tale of Adventure in the Untersberg. In this story, the Gnomes are still clearly subterranean creatures, guarding treasures of gold within the Untersberg mountain.

As a figure of 19th-century fairy tales, the term gnome became largely synonymous with other terms for "little people" by the 20th century, such as goblin, brownie, leprechaun and other instances of the household spirit type, losing its strict association with earth or the underground world.

=== Modern fantasy literature ===
- Creatures called gnomes have been used in the fantasy genre of fiction and later gaming since the mid-nineteenth century, typically in a cunning role, e.g. as an inventor.
- In L. Frank Baum's Oz books (published 1900 to 1920), the Nomes (so spelled), especially their king, are the chief adversaries of the Oz people. They are ugly, hot-tempered, immortal, round-bodied creatures with spindly limbs, long beards and wild hair, militantly collecting and protecting jewels and precious metals underground. (After Baum's death, Ruth Plumly Thompson, who continued the series -- from 1921 to 1976 -- also used the creatures, but reverted to the traditional spelling.) For his part, Baum also featured gnomes in his book The Life and Adventures of Santa Claus. They watch over the rocks, their king is part of the Council of Immortals, and they created the sleigh bells for Santa Claus's reindeer.
- J. R. R. Tolkien, in the legendarium (created 1914 to 1973) surrounding his Elves, uses "Gnomes" as the initial- but later dropped- name of the Noldor, the most gifted and technologically minded of his elvish races, in conscious exploitation of the similarity with the word gnomic. Gnome is thus Tolkien's English loan-translation of the Quenya word Noldo (plural Noldor), "those with knowledge". Tolkien's "Gnomes" are generally tall, beautiful, dark-haired, light-skinned, immortal, and wise. They are also proud, violent, and unduly admire their own creations, particularly their gemstones. Many live in cities below ground (Nargothrond) or in secluded mountain fortresses (Gondolin). He uses "Gnomes" to refer to both males and females. In The Father Christmas Letters (between 1920 and 1942), which Tolkien wrote for his children, Red Gnomes are presented as helpful creatures who come from Norway to the North Pole to assist Father Christmas and his Elves in fighting the wicked Goblins.
- BB's The Little Grey Men (1942) is a story of the last gnomes in England, little wild men who live by hunting and fishing.
- In C. S. Lewis's The Chronicles of Narnia (created 1950 to 1956), the gnomes are sometimes called "Earthmen". They live in the Underland, a series of caverns. Unlike the traditional, more human-like gnomes, they can have a wide variety of physical features and skin colours where some of them are either standing at 1 ft or being taller than humans. They are used as slaves by the Lady of the Green Kirtle until her defeat, at which point they return to their true home, the much deeper (and hotter) underground realm of Bism.
- The Dutch books Gnomes (1976) and Secrets of the Gnomes (1982), written by Wil Huygen, deal with gnomes living together in harmony. These same books are the basis for a made-for-TV animated film and the Spanish-animated series The World of David the Gnome (as well as the spin-off Wisdom of the Gnomes). The word "gnome", in this case, is used in place of the Dutch kabouter.
- In J. K. Rowling's Harry Potter series (created 1997 to 2007), gnomes are pests that inhabit the gardens of witches and wizards. They are small creatures with heads that look like potatoes on small stubby bodies. Gnomes are generally considered harmless but mischievous and may bite with sharp teeth. In the books, it is stated that the Weasleys are lenient to gnomes, and tolerate their presence, preferring to throw them out of the garden rather than more extreme measures.
- In A. Yoshinobu's Sorcerous Stabber Orphen, the European concept of a gnome is used in order to introduce the Far Eastern notion of the Koropokkuru, a mythical indigenous race of small people: gnomes are a persecuted minority banned from learning wizardry and attending magical schools.
- In Terry Brooks' Shannara series (created 1977 to 2017), gnomes are an offshoot race created after the Great Wars. There are several distinctive classes of gnomes. Gnomes are the smallest race. In The Sword of Shannara they are considered to be tribal and warlike, the one race that can be the most easily subverted to an evil cause. This is evidenced by their allegiance to the Warlock Lord in The Sword of Shannara and to the Mord Wraiths in The Wishsong of Shannara.
- Terry Pratchett included gnomes in his Discworld series. Gnomes were six inches in height but quite strong, often inflicting pain upon anyone underestimating them. One prominent gnome became a Watchman in Ankh-Morpork as the force became more diversified under the command of Sam Vimes, with Buggy Swires appearing in Jingo. Another gnome in the series was Wee Mad Arthur a pest terminator in Feet of Clay.

=== Music ===
- One of the first movements in Mussorgsky's 1874 work Pictures at an Exhibition is named "Gnomus" (Latin for "The Gnome"). It is written to sound as if a gnome is moving about, his movements constantly changing in speed.

Gnomus by Mussorgsky, 1874
A classical piece of music written to sound as if a gnome is moving about.

- "The Laughing Gnome" is a song by English musician David Bowie, released as a single in 1967. It became a hit when reissued in 1973, in the wake of Bowie's commercial success.
- The 1970 album All Things Must Pass by English musician George Harrison has a cover image of the musician sitting among a group of garden gnomes.
- "The Gnome" is a song by Pink Floyd on their 1967 album The Piper at the Gates of Dawn. It is about a gnome named Grimble Grumble.

=== Games ===
- In the Dungeons & Dragons fantasy role-playing game, gnomes are one of the core races available for play as player characters. They are described as being smaller than dwarves and large-nosed. They have an affinity with small animals and a particular interest in gemstones. Depending on setting and subrace, they may also have a natural skill with illusion magic or engineering.
- In the Warcraft franchise (1994 to present), particularly as featured in the massively multiplayer online role-playing game World of Warcraft, gnomes are a race of beings separate from but allied to dwarves and humans, with whom they share the lands of the Eastern Kingdoms. Crafty, intelligent, and smaller than their dwarven brethren, gnomes are one of two races in Azeroth regarded as technologically savvy. It is suggested in lore that the gnomes originally were mechanical creations that at some point became organic lifeforms. In World of Warcraft, gnomes are an exile race, having irradiated their home city of Gnomeregan in an unsuccessful last-ditch effort to drive out marauding foes.
- In the RuneScape franchise (2001 to present), gnomes are featured as NPCs, with the Tree Gnome Village, and Gnome Stronghold, being featured in a number of quests. A Gnome child NPC has since become a meme, and is featured on a number of merchandise items.

=== Movies ===
- The 1967 Walt Disney movie The Gnome-Mobile
- The 2011 animated movie Gnomeo & Juliet
- The 2018 animated movie Sherlock Gnomes featured gnomish versions of several classic Sherlock Holmes characters.

=== TV Shows ===
- The Disney+ Series The Santa Clauses
- The Little Troll Prince features the troll prince Bu, turning into a gnome and gnomes by the end of the special
- David the Gnome, Wisdom of the Gnomes, The New World of the Gnomes and Gordon the Garden Gnome.
- Scooby-Doo! Mystery Incorporated episode "The Grasp of the Gnome"
- Wallace & Gromit: Vengeance Most Fowl, a 2024 British stop motion animated comedy film produced by Aardman Animations and the BBC released for Christmas features a large number of robotic garden gnomes.

== Derivative uses ==
=== Garden gnomes ===
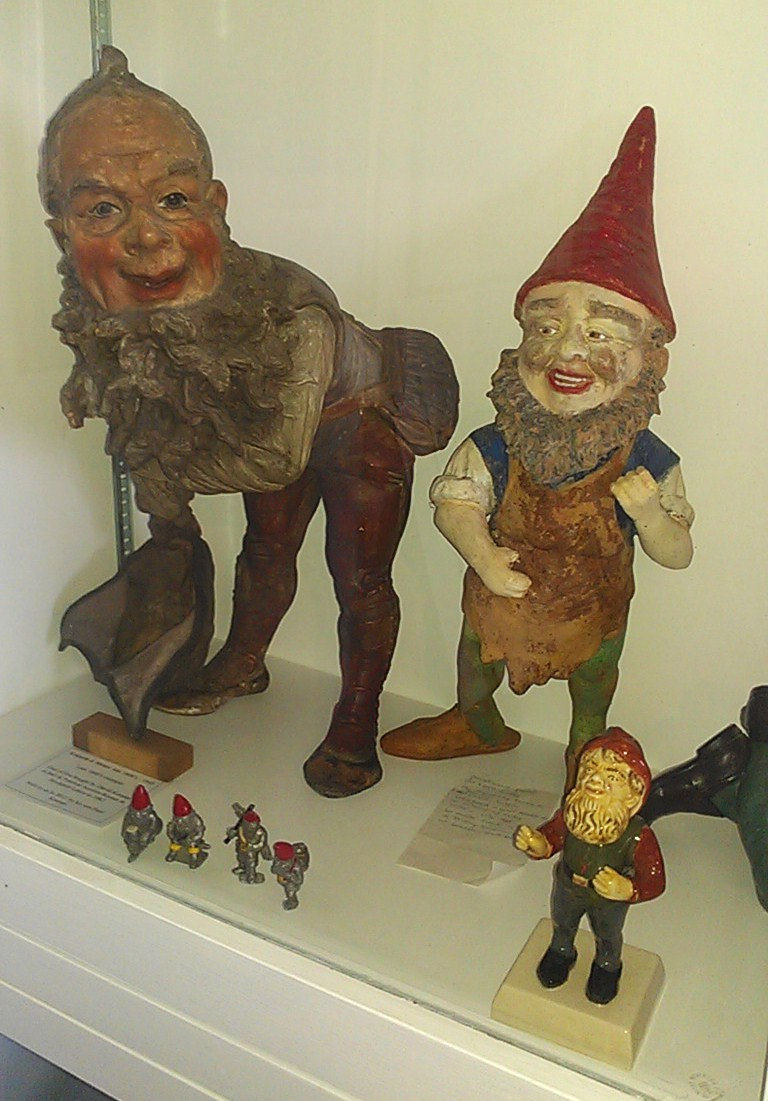
Historic garden gnomes on display at the Gnome Reserve in Devon, UK. The ornament on the left of the image was produced by Eckardt and Mentz in the late nineteenth-century,

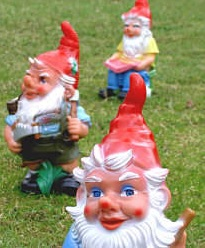
By the late twentieth century the garden gnome had come to be stylised as an elderly man with a full white beard and a pointed hat.

After World War II (with early references, in ironic use, from the late 1930s) the diminutive figurines introduced as lawn ornaments during the 19th century came to be known as garden gnomes. The image of the gnome changed further during the 1960s to 1970s, when the first plastic garden gnomes were manufactured. These gnomes followed the style of the 1937 depiction of the seven dwarves in Snow White and the Seven Dwarfs by Disney. This "Disneyfied" image of the gnome was built upon by the illustrated children's book classic Gnomes (1976), in the original Dutch Leven en werken van de Kabouter, by author Wil Huygen and artist Rien Poortvliet, followed in 1981 by The Secret Book of Gnomes. Garden gnomes share a resemblance to the Scandinavian tomte and nisse, and the Swedish term "tomte" can be translated as "gnome" in English.

=== Gnome-themed parks ===
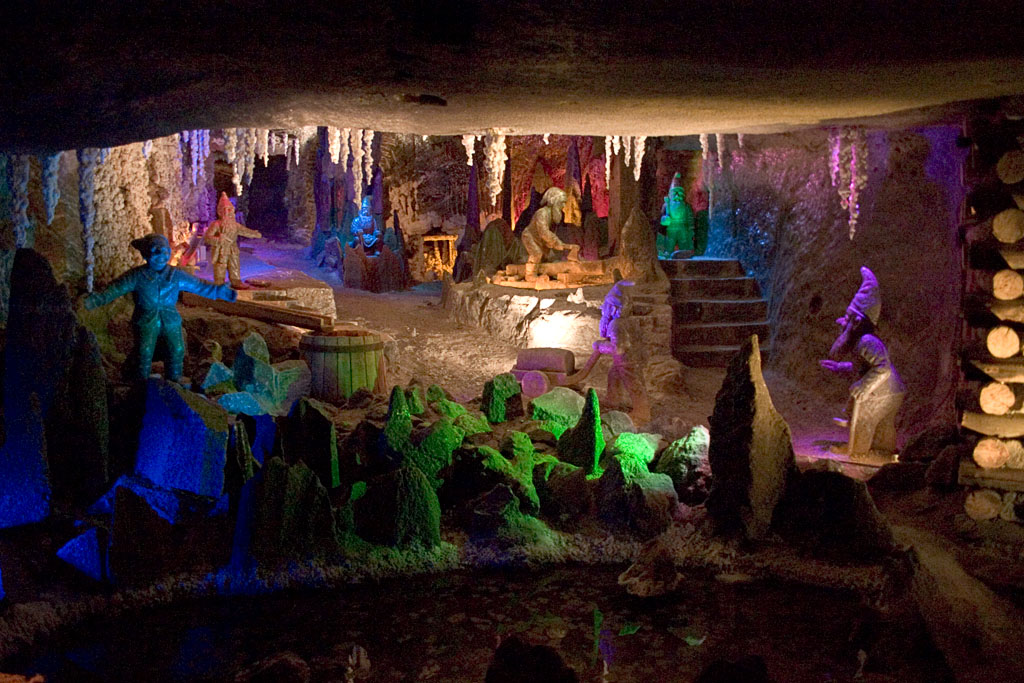
Gnome garden at the Wieliczka Salt Mine, Poland

Several gnome themed entertainment parks exist. Notable ones are:

- The Gnome Reserve, at West Putford near Bradworthy in North Devon, United Kingdom
- Gnomeland, at Watermouth Castle in Berrynarbor, North Devon, United Kingdom
- Gnome Magic Garden, at Colchester, United Kingdom
- Gnometown, USA in Dawson, Minnesota, United States
- The Gnome Village, at Efteling theme park in Kaatsheuvel, Netherlands
- Zwergen-Park Trusetal, in Trusetal, Germany
- Gnom's Park in Nowa Sól, Poland.

=== Gnome parades ===
Gnome parades are held annually at Atlanta's Inman Park Festival. Numerous one-off gnome parades have been held, including in Savannah, Georgia (April 2012) and Cleveland, Ohio (May 2011).

=== Metaphorical uses ===
- The expression "Gnomes of Zurich", Swiss bankers pictured as diminutive creatures hoarding gold in subterranean vaults, was derived from a speech in 1956 by Harold Wilson, and gained currency in the 1960s (OED notes the New Statesman issue of 27 November 1964 as earliest attestation).
- Architect Earl Young built a number of stone houses in Charlevoix, Michigan, that have been referred to as gnome homes.
- A user of Wikipedia or any wiki who makes useful incremental edits without clamouring for attention is called a WikiGnome.

== See also ==
- Dwarf (folklore)
- Garden Gnome
- Nisse (folklore)
- Kobold
- Domovoy
- Leshy
- Moss people
- Pukwudgie
- Elf
- Garden hermit
- Knocker (folklore)
- Gnome (Dungeons & Dragons)
- Wrocław's dwarfs
- Travelling gnome
- Yaksha
- Pixie
