= Gnomes (1980 film) =

- Genre: Animation; Family; Fantasy
- Based on: Gnomes by Wil Huygen
- Written by: Sam Moore; Maurice Rapf
- Directed by: Jack Zander
- Narrated by: Lee Richardson
- Music by: Neil Warner
- Country of origin: United States
- Original language: English

Production
- Executive producers: Thomas W. Moore; Anne E. Upson
- Producer: Jack Zander
- Editors: Maxwell Seligman; Ron Silver
- Running time: 60 minutes
- Production company: Tomorrow Entertainment

Original release
- Network: CBS
- Release: November 11, 1980

Gnomes is an American 1980 hour-long animated TV special, based on the book of the same name by Dutch writer Wil Huygen and illustrator Rien Poortvliet. The show was first broadcast on CBS, on November 11, 1980. It was nominated for an Emmy in 1981 for Outstanding Animated Program.

Several years after this film was released, the television series, The World of David the Gnome was created, based on the same book.

== Plot ==
The movie starts by introducing gnomes in general, and a particular family of forest gnomes who live together in a home under a tree. The family consists of a father, mother, grandfather, older son Tor, and a set of young twins, Im and Impy. Tor is about to marry his fiancée Lisa, and the gnomes are busy decorating and preparing for the wedding.

In the same forest live a family of trolls: a large and stupid father troll, a somewhat more intelligent mother troll (who wears a snake in her hair and smokes a cigar), their two bumbling older sons and a young troll child affectionately called "Runt". When the father gnome frees the trapped bear cub they had intended to have for their supper, the trolls resolve to get their revenge.

The trolls’ intended method of revenge is to set the gnome dwelling on fire, and each member of the troll family marches toward the gnomes’ household, memorably chanting “burn, burn, burn” in unison.

Lisa and her parents arrive, carried by a goose from the city. They are "house gnomes" who live among humans and are the "aristocrats" of gnome society. Another less welcome arrival is Uncle Kostya from Siberia who crashes the wedding ceremony, adding extra alcohol to Grandpa's punch and making inappropriate advances to the mother of the bride. Their differences are soon forgotten however when the trolls strike.

The movie also contains a handful of vignettes, which use still illustrations from the original book and narration to explain some of the facts about the different sorts of gnomes, and what sorts of duties gnomes perform to help the creatures they live among.

== Cast ==
- Lee Richardson as the Narrator
- Arthur Anderson as Grunge and Runt
- Rex Everhart as Father Gnome
- Anne Francine as Lisa's Mother and Troll #2
- Hetty Galen as Mother Gnome and Imp
- Gordon Halliday as Tor
- Bob McFadden as Grandpa Gnome, Uncle Kostya and Troll #3
- Corinne Orr as Lisa and Impy
- Joe Silver as Troll #1

== Airing ==
It was once common to see this film played on cable television movie channels, however it has since become very hard to find as it is not readily available for sale on DVD or VHS.

== Copyright status ==
It is quite popular in Sweden where it has a fairly large fan base, but due to its unclear copyright status (after the production company shut down) further viewing was deemed impossible by Sveriges Television until the status was resolved. Member of the Swedish Riksdag Karl Sigfrid aimed a written question to Minister for Justice Beatrice Ask how this and similar issues should be resolved.

== DVD releases ==
Despite no official news about the copyright status, a DVD release was released in Sweden on December 1, 2010. The distributor is the Norwegian company CCV.
