= The New World of the Gnomes =

TV series

- Spanish: El nuevo mundo de los Gnomos
- Genre: Animation
- Created by: Claudio Biern Boyd
- Based on: Gnomes by Wil Huygen
- Directed by: Luis Ballester
- Narrated by: Teófilo Martínez
- Country of origin: Spain
- Original language: Spanish
- No. of series: 1
- No. of episodes: 26

Production
- Executive producer: Claudio Biern Boyd
- Running time: 24 minutes
- Production companies: BRB International; Antena 3 TV; CLT-UFA; Panini

Original release
- Network: Antena 3
- Release: 4 March – 23 September 1997

Related
- Wisdom of the Gnomes; The Great Adventure of the Gnomes; The Gnomes in the Snow; The Fantastic Adventures of the Gnomes

The New World of the Gnomes (Spanish: El Nuevo Mundo de los Gnomos) is a Spanish animated adventure series produced by Spanish studio BRB Internacional with Antena 3 TV, CLT-UFA and Panini. It is a spin-off of the series The World of David the Gnome and based on the children's book The Secret Book of Gnomes, by the Dutch author Wil Huygen and illustrator Rien Poortvliet. David the Gnome travels the world with his nephew Tomte as they protect the world from trolls polluting the world. The show was also made in collaboration with the WWF (World Wildlife Foundation).

In the United States, the show aired from January 15 to October 6, 2002 on the program block Mi Tele on TeleFutura. Later the show was moved to Toonturama on the weekend morning block, beginning on March 23, 2002.

== Episode list ==
No. in series	Title	Original release date
1	"The lords of the jungle" (Spanish: Los señores de la jungla)	March 4, 1997
2	"Fire in the forest" (Spanish: El gran incendio)	TBA
3	"A whale song" (Spanish: El canto de la ballena)	TBA
4	"A tiger tale" (Spanish: La leyenda del tigre)	TBA
5	"Change of heart" (Spanish: Cambio de actitud)	TBA
6	"Amazon Adventure" (Spanish: Aventura en el Amazonas)	TBA
7	"Wetland Wonderland" (Spanish: Humedales en peligro)	TBA
8	"Gnomes to the rescue" (Spanish: Gnomos al rescate)	TBA
9	"Extinct Means Gone Forever" (Spanish: Extinguidos para siempre)	TBA
10	"Reef Robbers" (Spanish: Ladrones de arrecifes)	TBA
11	"Invisible Enemy" (Spanish: El enemigo invisible)	TBA
12	"The Incredible Journey" (Spanish: Un viaje increíble)	TBA
13	"Paladin, Aqua Knight" (Spanish: Paladín, caballero del agua)	TBA
14	"River Rescue" (Spanish: Salvemos el río)	TBA
15	"A Hole In The Sky" (Spanish: El agujero en el cielo)	TBA
16	"Rocky, RhinoStar" (Spanish: Rocky Rinoestrella)	TBA
17	"A Great Gnome Expo" (Spanish: La Expo de los Gnomos)	TBA
18	"Panda Passage" (Spanish: La senda de los pandas)	TBA
19	"Mediterranean Odyssey" (Spanish: Odisea en el Mediterráneo)	TBA
20	"Elephant Expedition" (Spanish: Expedición de elefantes)	TBA
21	"Gnomes Down Under" (Spanish: Los Gnomos en Australia)	TBA
22	"Stray for a Day" (Spanish: Perdidos por un día)	TBA
23	"The Lost Island" (Spanish: La isla perdida)	TBA
24	"Turtle Trouble" (Spanish: Tortugas en peligro)	TBA
25	"Gnome Oasis" (Spanish: Oasis)	TBA
26	"The Longest Wedding" (Spanish: La boda más larga)	23 September 1997
