= The Secret Book of Gnomes =

Series of children's books written by Wil Huygen

- Author: Wil Huygen
- Country: Netherlands
- Language: Dutch
- Genre: Children's literature, mockumentary
- Media type: Print (hardcover and paperback); Audiobook
- OCLC: 8283087

The Secret Book of Gnomes is a series of books about gnomes written for children. They contain fictional stories and guides about how gnomes live in harmony with their environment, such as what a gnome has in his first aid kit and how a gnome's house is built. The books were written by the Dutch author Wil Huygen and illustrator Rien Poortvliet, though they have claimed that parts were written by a gnome called David. Those authors also created another series about gnomes entitled Gnomes. That was later used as a basis for the television shows David the Gnome and Wisdom of the Gnomes by BRB Internacional.
