= Gnomes (book) =

1976 book by Wil Huygen and illustrated by Rien Poortvliet

- English cover
- Author: Wil Huygen
- Original title: Leven en werken van de kabouter
- Illustrator: Rien Poortvliet
- Language: Dutch
- Genre: Children's literature
- Publisher: Van Holkema & Warendorf
- Publication date: 1976
- Publication place: The Netherlands
- English publication date: 1977
- Media type: Print
- Pages: 212
- ISBN: 9026949588
- OCLC: 4188345
- LC Class: PT5881.18.U9 L47
- Followed by: The Secret Book of Gnomes

Gnomes, originally published in Dutch in 1976 as Leven en werken van de kabouter (lit. 'Life and work of the gnomes'), then released in English in 1977, is a fiction book written by Wil Huygen and illustrated by Rien Poortvliet. The book explains the life and habitat of gnomes in an in-universe fashion, much as a biology book would do, complete with illustrations and textbook notes.

The book was well received by critics. Huygen's writing, which mixed physiology with fiction, and Poortvliet's drawings, which used a natural style and watercolor, were both praised. Gnomes sold almost a million units after its first year of being published in the United States. Its financial success led to the creation of several spin-off books about the same fictional creatures, as well as many other products, such as toys, clothing and games.

== Synopsis ==
The book is written like a biology book, describing the habitat of the mythical creatures known as gnomes (Dutch: kabouter). In the book, Huygen and Poortvliet say they have spent at least twenty years observing them and call their study the "first work of consequence on the subject to be published since Wunderlich's bulky and dubious treatise De Hominibus Parvisimis appeared in 1580".

It describes every aspect of the mythical creatures. They are very small ("weight less than one pound and stand six inches high") and can live upwards of 400 years. The female gnome is generally smaller than her male counterpart, and her clothing is grey instead of blue. A gnome pregnancy takes 12 months, and they always have twins, who live with their parents for at least a hundred years. They can speak several languages and understand animals, but write using a version of the runic alphabet.

The gnomes also used to live in society alongside humans, especially in Europe, but due to pollution and deforestation they have slowly retreated to their secret homes. The book ends with a message, asking people to stop attacking one another, as well as reminding human society to stop destroying the environment.

== Themes ==
According to Adams and van Straten, the protagonist of the book embodies the "shared world view and values" of the authors: the gnomes revere nature and are tempered creatures. They show "the moral didacticism of Poortvliet", who loved nature since his youth and was an advocate for "selectful (sic) and respectful hunting." The gnomes from the book are also guided by Huygen's "medical compassion", as described by Poortvliet.

In an article about 1977 environmentalist literature, George H. Siehl highlighted Huygen's book, alongside The Foxes' Union (1977), for its "unique approach to providing natural history cum environmental message" and noted that the "brief closing chapters make the environmental message explicit". For Siehl, one of the most important aspects of those books was how they represented the natural world: "the style is so subtle, so effective, that most standard approaches to the subject matter will never match it." Siehl also noted that Gnomes shared some similarities to economist E. F. Schumacher's book Small Is Beautiful (1973).

Additionally, the gnomes in the book are based on the Dutch "kabouter", a word that was also associated at the time to a "nascent environmental movement" happening in Amsterdam.

== History ==
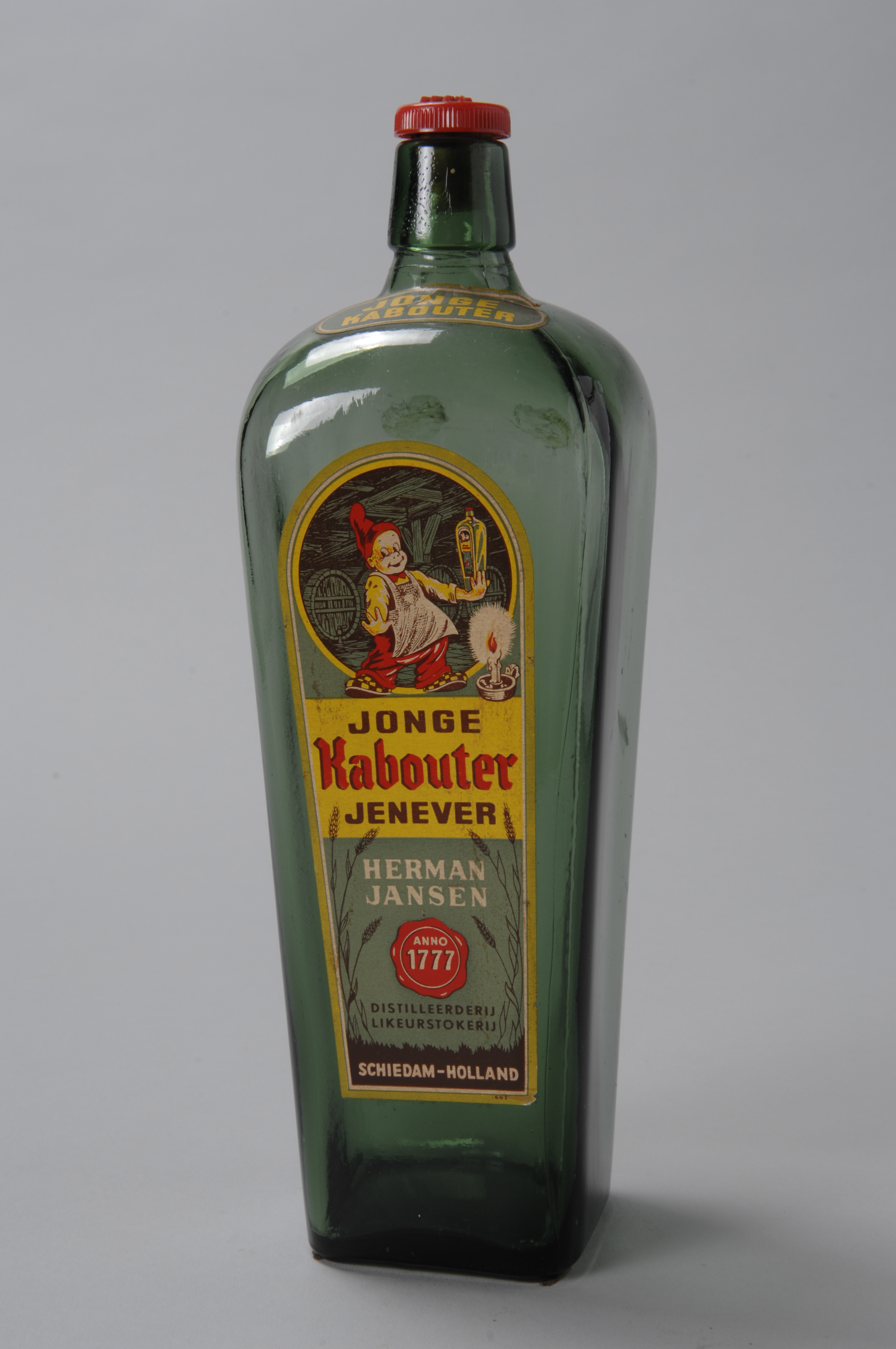
The "Gnome Gin"

Before working together on the book, Wil Huygen and Poortvliet used to hunt together, and were members of the Royal Association of Dutch Hunters.

Poortvliet, who contributed with his drawings, was known as an omgekeerde illustrator, "reverse illustrator" in English. Instead of illustrating a writer's work, it was common for him to have others create a story for his illustrations. Poortvliet was influenced by other Dutch artists, such as Marten Toonder, creator of the Kabouter Jenever or "Gnome Gin".

While planning the book, Poortvliet sought the opinion of his children, who "thought it was a bad idea". Tok, one of Poortvliet's sons, recounted how "[t]hey always kept in mind that it should be a book with a wink in its eye." Even though Poortvliet had an idea of what he wanted the gnomes to be for a long time, he let Huygen do most of the writing, due to his knowledge as a general practitioner. Huygen was responsible for creating the story behind Poortvliet's drawings. He used his medical knowledge, including "acupuncture, herbalism and psychology", to help describe the creatures and their habits.

=== Publication ===
The book was originally published in The Netherlands with the title Leven en werken van de Kabouter in 1976 by Van Holkema & Warendorf, an imprint of Uitgeverij Unieboek at the time. Poortvliet, who had been working as an independent illustrator since 1968 at the advice of C.A.J. van Dishoeck, Unieboek's Director of Publishing, had his books published by the company from 1970.

The book's publishing rights for the United States and Canada were acquired by Harry N. Abrams. Ian Ballantine, who worked for Abrams at the time, was in a Dutch airport when he received a copy of the book, and immediately loved the idea. The company, with the assistance of the paperback house Bantam, planned initially for a release of 40,000 copies to the market. The book, though, ended up selling 250,000 copies during its prepublication period, and the publishers also expected "to sell another 150,000 copies at the full price".

Besides special and commemorative editions of the original book, as well as a pop-up book by John Strejan, new books detailing aspects of the lives of the gnomes were released in the following years:

- Poortvliet, Rien (1981). Teeny Tiny Gnome Tomes. Harry N. Abrams. ISBN 9-7805-1741-551-1.
- Huygen, Wil (1982). Secrets of the Gnomes. New York: Ballantine. ISBN 9-7803-4530-861-0.
- Huygen, Wil (1994). The Complete Gnomes. New York: Harry N. Abrams. ISBN 9-7808-1093-195-4.
- Poortvliet, Rien (1997). A Gnome's Day. Netherlands: Kabouter. ISBN 9-7815-7909-020-3.

== Reception ==
Writing for The New York Times, Richard Lingeman compared Poortvliet's drawings to those of Norman Rockwell, "though softer and fuzzier". Lingeman also noted that the gnomes, although somewhat similar in design to the Seven Dwarves, do not share Disney's "manipulative cuteness", and instead are closer to drawings of nature. The reviewer said the same about Huygen's writing, saying it had a "stolid Dutch thoroughness running through".

In a review for the Los Angeles Times, Jack Smith described Gnomes as "one of those remarkable books which represent an author's almost obsessive dedication to a single subject". Smith also commented on the writing, saying that it was able to "lift above the tedious" present in some of the less interesting sections of the book, such as when the internal organs of the gnomes are described. He also praised "charming illustrations" by Poortvliet.

Gnomes became a bestseller in the United States, first appearing on national non-fiction bestseller lists three weeks after its release and remaining there for 62 weeks. More than 700,000 units of the book had been sold after its first year in the market. It marked Van Holkema & Warendorf's first bestseller since its merger, and is considered to be the work that made Poortvliet internationally famous.

The book turned out to be a major financial success to the American publisher, which led to the creation of several spin-off books about the life of gnomes, as well as other commercial products—such as clothing, dolls, games and jewelry—which, by 1999, had made the publisher over $10 million in gross revenue. As of 2019, over four million copies of the book had been sold worldwide.

== Adaptations ==
Gnomes was adapted in a 1980 television film of the same name, directed by Jack Zander. The rights for the movie were bought in 1979 by Thomas W. Moore, and it was the first animated feature film by Zander.

=== In Spain ===
The book was published as El libro secreto de los gnomos (The Secret Book of Gnomes) in 1980 by Montana (now part of Random House Mondadori) in Spain. It was adapted into a cartoon show, David, el Gnomo (English: The World of David the Gnome) in 1985 by BRB Internacional. In 1987, a spin-off of the show based on the books, La llamada de los gnomos (English: Wisdom of the Gnomes) was released.

== See also ==
- Paulus the woodgnome
- Pinkeltje
