= The Mountains of Beyond =

- The World of David the Gnome episode
- Episode no.: Episode 26
- Original air date: 19 April 1986

Episode chronology
← Previous "The Gift"	Next → —

"The Mountains of Beyond" is the 26th and final episode of the Spanish animated television series The World of David the Gnome. It originally aired on 19 April 1986, in Spain on TVE1, and later aired on 9 February 1988, in the United States on Nickelodeon during its Nick Jr. block.

The final episode deals with David and Lisa who are about to turn 400 years old heading off on a Journey on their fox Swift to the mountains of beyond where they will die because Gnomes can only live up to 400 years.

== Plot ==
David and Lisa are working around their house preparing for their long journey to the Mountains of Beyond because their time on Earth is almost over. Lisa is sad about it but David comforts her, suddenly they hear a knock on the door. It's an arctic mouse with a message from David's friend Casper who wishes to join them on the long journey ahead because his time on Earth is almost over as well and he doesn't want to go alone. David and Lisa begin to leave with Lisa wearing the pendant that David gave to her when they got engaged. They let out their mice and their cricket, blow out the candles, and leave their home for the final time.

Outside they are greeted by their forest animal friends who wish them luck. David and Lisa then hop on Swift the fox and head off to the Blue Mountains to pick up Casper. When they arrive at Casper's house, he invites them all inside for a farewell dinner before they go. When they get inside and sit down for dinner, they talk about how their time is nearly over and that all things never last forever, not even gnomes. They then share toasts to the many things in their lives: friendship, themselves, the gnomes who will come after them, Casper's books, their families, their future generations, their ancestors, and the humans who have been friends to the gnomes.

Afterwards, David, Lisa, and Casper hop on Swift to leave for the Mountains of Beyond with Casper saying farewell to his home as it's being buried in snow. Swift manages to run through the snow and the forest until he and the Gnomes all finally approach the mountain. Before David, Lisa, and Casper ascend the mountain, they say farewell to Swift then they tell Swift to head back home once they reach the summit of the mountain. But as he is leaving, Swift turns back and runs up to the summit of the mountain because although he was told to leave, Swift could not head home without seeing David and Lisa one last time.

In the meadow on the mountain, David and Lisa say their goodbyes to each other, die, and turn into a pair of intertwined apple trees while Casper dies and turns into an oak tree. All of this ends up devastating Swift, who howls sadly. On his way home, Swift meets another gnome named Christopher and his vixen, Agnes. Swift and Agnes soon become romantically interested in each other and walk together with Christopher, who says goodbye to the viewers. The scene then cuts to the spirits of David and Lisa who also say goodbye.

== Reception ==
=== Response ===
Anthony Ocasio of Screen Rant places this episode as number 3 of The 10 most 'WTF' Television Series Finales. He also states "If you have kids, have them watch it as well. In the final moments you, along with David, Lisa, and Casper can wave goodbye... goodbye to your children's innocence."

Lauren Vino of MTV talked about three things the episode taught us about life. She says that "Growing up doesn't have to be scary...," "...but saying goodbye is unbelievably sad," and "We put it all in perspective eventually." Vino states a few things about the finale, "If you watch the final episode as an adult, you'll be shocked at how chill David is about dying" and "People have argued that David and Lisa did not die, but instead turned into trees -- which is kind of like telling kids they went off to live on a farm".

Kevin L. Clark of Hip-Hop Wired places the episode as number 2 of Banned From TV: The 10 Most Controversial TV Series Finales. Clark stated that the premise of the episode is "A hard concept for children to understand, given the nice nature of the show, and made worst since neither David nor Lisa are really that interested in dying."
