= Hippomanes =

Structure which develops in pregnant horses

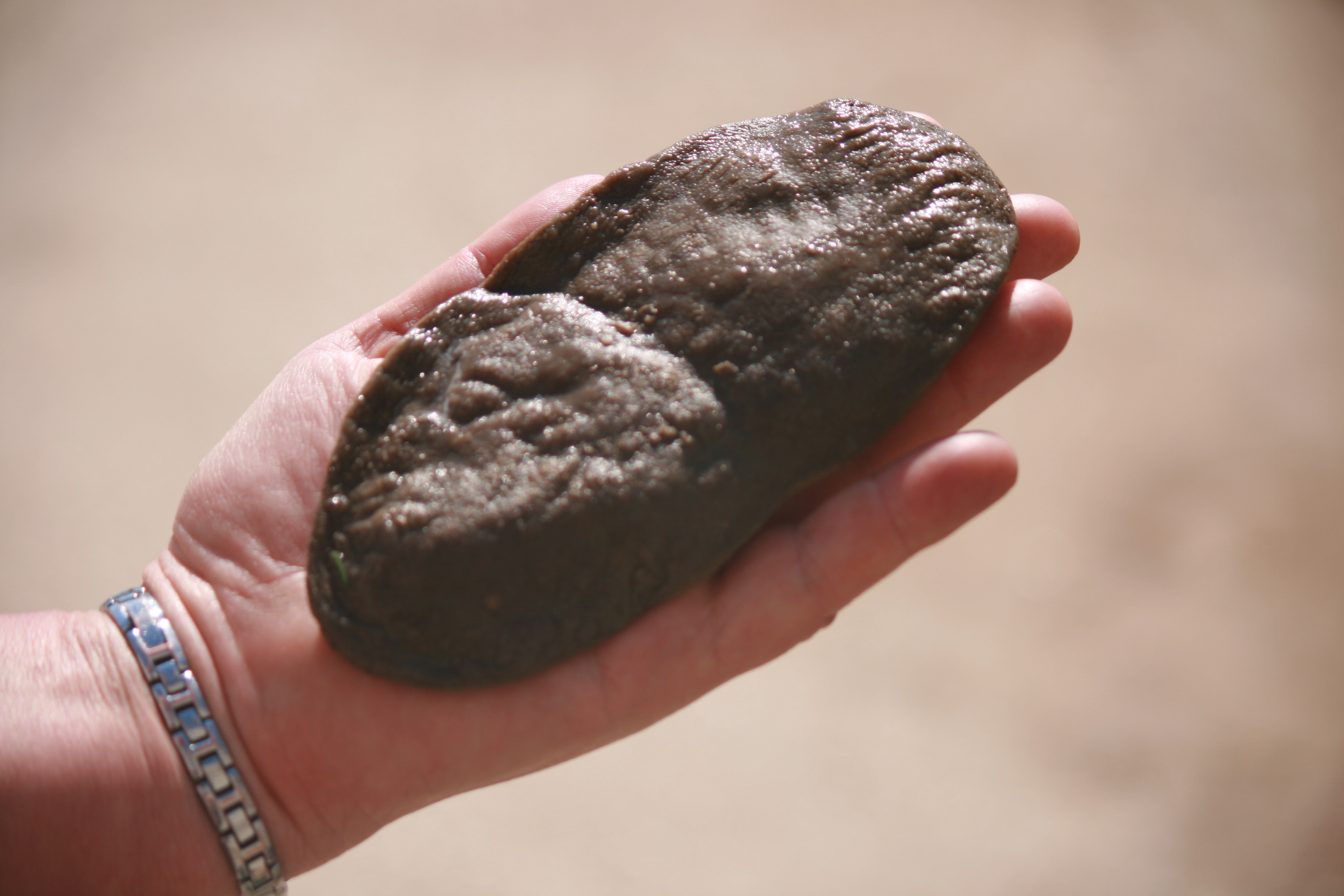
Hippomanes of a cow

Hippomanes (Greek ἱππομανές) are brownish or olive-greenish, elastic formations that arise physiologically in female bovines and equines during pregnancy.

== Formation ==
The up to fist-sized hippomanes are either attached to the allantois membrane or swim freely in the allantoic fluid. Occasionally such formations also occur in ruminants (cows, sheep, goat) and pigs. Similar formations have also been found in sea-cow, lemur and hippopotamus, but the objects found in the amnion and allantois are distinguishable. This has caused the confusion over the word "hippomanes" in scientific literature, with propositions to use it only for objects found in Equidae pregnancies.

Hippomanes arise from unconsumed and thickened nutrient fluid (histiotrophe) of the placenta, in concentric layers around the centre of allantoic calculi of tissue debris. The chemical composition is different from amniotic fluid, which along with the insolubility suggests that it's not a result of a simple precipitation process, but a denatured mucoprotein complex.

Hippomanes first appear in pregnant horses and zebras ca. 85 days from conception, earlier there are small white flecks of tissue debris instead. The changes in hippomanes' color correspond to changes in color of allantoic fluid. They are often surrounded by shed cells.

== History ==
Hippomanes was first named and described in Ancient Greece, with the name literally meaning "horse madness". It was used as an aphrodisiac in Ancient period. One of the first written mentions is Aristotle describing the hippomanes circa 350BC. According to Pliny the Elder, the Hippomanes, which are said to be found as tough bodies on the forehead of the newborn foal, are eaten by the mare immediately after birth. If the mare was prevented from doing so, she would feel no affection for the foal and refuse to feed it, which is why it was believed that the power of love was concentrated in the hippomanes.

The vulval discharge from the mare in oestrus was also referred to as Hippomanes in antiquity and was used equally for love potions and love spells.

In a Greek mythology tale, Glaucus, the son of Sisyphus, is devoured by his horses at the funeral games for Pelias, the father of Acastus, during the chariot race, because Aphrodite had driven them wild with Hippomanes.

Later hippomanes has been described and used by homeopaths.

A hippomane is commonly referred to among horsemen as 'foal's bread'. Its appearance at the birth of a foal (sometimes in its mouth) is regarded as a symbol of good luck. When dried, a 'foal's bread' takes the shape of a tough, leathery heart.

== See also ==
- Foal's Bread, 2011 Australian novel about showjumping
