= Ludovico Maria Sinistrari =

Italian Franciscan priest and author

Ludovico Maria Sinistrari (26 February 1622 – 1701) was an Italian Franciscan priest and author.

== Biography ==
Born in Ameno, Italy, he studied in Pavia and entered the Franciscan Order in 1647. He taught philosophy and theology to students in Pavia, some of them having been attracted to the area by his fame.

Sinistrari was an advisor to the Supreme Sacred Congregation of the Roman and Universal Inquisition in Rome. He was considered an expert on exorcism and wrote of the effects (during exorcisms) of various plants and other substances including cubeb, cardamom, ginger and nutmeg. He was also considered an expert on demonology, sins relating to sexuality, and all combinations thereof, including investigations of those individuals accused of sexual relations with demons. Allegations along these lines became staples of later Inquisition investigations of those accused of witchcraft.

== Bibliography of written works ==
Sinistrari was a prolific author and was responsible for many of the works which framed Inquisition thinking during the 17th century, particularly regarding incubus, succubus and other demons which were thought to roam the Earth, and regarding sexual practices which were considered sinful:

- De Daemonialitate et Incubis et Succubis (Demoniality: Or, Incubi and Succubi).
- Lewdness – which dealt with sexual sins (especially homosexuality).
- Peccatum Mutum (The Mute Sin) – finally published in 1893, dealing specifically with sodomy.
- De Delictis et Poenis Tractatus Absolutissimus (The Most Absolute Treatise of Crime and Punishment) – which he started in 1688 and completed in 1700, a year before his death. Despite being asked to complete the work by the Franciscan order as a general community criminal code and despite Sinistrari's work for the Inquisition, the book was added to the Index Librorum Prohibitorum in 1709 and banned (it dealt issues relating to the qualification of judges).

== See also ==
- Christian demonology
- Sexuality in Christian demonology
