= Gordon Halliday =

Scottish cricketer

Personal information
- Full name: Gordon Donald Halliday
- Born: 11 November 1950 (age 76); Edinburgh, Midlothian, Scotland
- Batting: Right-handed
- Bowling: Right-arm medium

Domestic team information
- Years: Team
- 1983: Scotland
- 1981–1988: Northumberland

Career statistics
Competition	List A
Matches	3
Runs scored	63
Batting average	15.75
100s/50s	–/1
Top score	57
Balls bowled	120
Wickets	2
Bowling average	49.00
5 wickets in innings	–
10 wickets in match	–
Best bowling	2/75
Catches/stumpings	–/–
- Source: Cricinfo, 2 July 2011

Gordon Donald Halliday (born 11 November 1950) is a former Scottish cricketer. Halliday was a right-handed batsman who bowled right-arm medium pace. He was born in Edinburgh, Midlothian.

Halliday made his debut for Northumberland in the 1981 Minor Counties Championship against Staffordshire. Halliday played Minor counties cricket for Northumberland from 1981 to 1988, which included 48 Minor Counties Championship appearances and 8 MCCA Knockout Trophy matches. It was however for his native Scotland that he made his List A debut for, playing 2 matches in the 1983 Benson & Hedges Cup against Worcestershire and Gloucestershire. He also made 2 List A appearances for Northumberland, against Middlesex in the 1984 NatWest Trophy and Essex in the 1986 NatWest Trophy. In these 2 matches, he scored 60 runs at an average of 30.00, with a high score of 57. His highest score came in the match against Essex, a match in which he also took both of his wickets in List A cricket, those of Graham Gooch and Neil Foster.
