= Johann Beckmann =

German scientific author

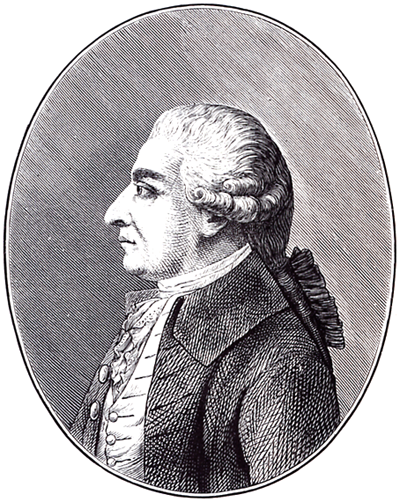
Johann Beckmann

Johann Beckmann (1739–1811) was a German scientific author and coiner of the word technology, to mean the science of trades. He was the first man to teach technology and write about it as an academic subject.

== Life ==
He was born on 4 June 1739 at Hoya in Hanover, where his father was postmaster and receiver of taxes. He was educated at Stade and the University of Göttingen, where he studied theology, mathematics, physics, natural history, and public finance and administration. After completing his studies, in 1762 he made a study tour through Brunswick and the Dutch Republic examining mines, factories, natural history museums, private collections, universities and their professors.

The death of his mother in 1762 having deprived him of his means of support, he went in 1763 on the invitation of the pastor of the Lutheran community, Anton Friedrich Büsching, the founder of the modern historic statistical method of geography, to teach natural history in the Lutheran gymnasium St. Petrischule in St Petersburg, Russia. This office he relinquished in 1765, and travelled in Denmark and Sweden, during 1765–66, where he studied the methods of working the mines, factories and foundries as well as collections of art and natural history. He made the acquaintance of Linnaeus at Uppsala. (His travel diary of these journeys Schwedische Reise in den Jahren 1765–1766 was published in Uppsala in 1911.) In 1766 he was appointed extraordinary professor of philosophy at Göttingen. There he lectured on political and domestic economy, and in 1768 he founded a botanic garden on the principles of Linnaeus. Such was his success that in 1770 he was appointed ordinary professor.

He was in the habit of taking his students into the workshops, that they might acquire a practical as well as a theoretical knowledge of different processes and handicrafts. While thus engaged he determined to trace the history and describe the existing condition of each of the arts and sciences on which he was lecturing. But even Beckmann's industry and ardour were unable to overtake the amount of study necessary for this task. He therefore confined his attention to several practical arts and trades; and to these labors we owe his Beiträge zur Geschichte der Erfindungen (1780–1805), translated into English as the History of Inventions, discoveries and origins (1797, 4th ed 1846) a work in which he relates the origin, history and recent condition of the various machines, utensils, etc., employed in trade and for domestic purposes. This work entitles Beckmann to be regarded as the founder of scientific technology, a term which he was the first to use in 1772.

Beckmann's approach was that of a scholar working in the Enlightenment, and his analytical writings on technology mirrored the work of Diderot and his Encyclopedie, and the Descriptions des Arts et Metiers. He must have been inspired by the taxonomic work of Linnaeus and the Bibliothecae of Albrecht von Haller. Nothing similar was being produced in English at that time. He was the first to write historical and critical accounts of the techniques of craft and manufacture and publish classifications of techniques. His goal was to produce a survey which would inspire others to make useful improvements.

In 1772 Beckmann was elected a member of the Royal Society of Göttingen, and he contributed valuable scientific dissertations to its proceedings until 1783, when he withdrew from all further share in its work. He was also member of scientific societies in Celle, Halle, Munich, Erfurt, Amsterdam, Stockholm and Saint Petersburg. In 1784, he was appointed a Councillor to the Hanoverian Court. In 1790, he was elected a foreign member of the Royal Swedish Academy of Sciences. In 1809 he became member of the Royal Institute of the Netherlands.

He died on 3 February 1811.

Klemm states '[He] should be credited with being the first reliable historian of inventions' and so must be regarded as the father of the study of the History of Technology

A Johann Beckmann Society was founded in 1987 at Hoya to celebrate his life and work.

== Works ==
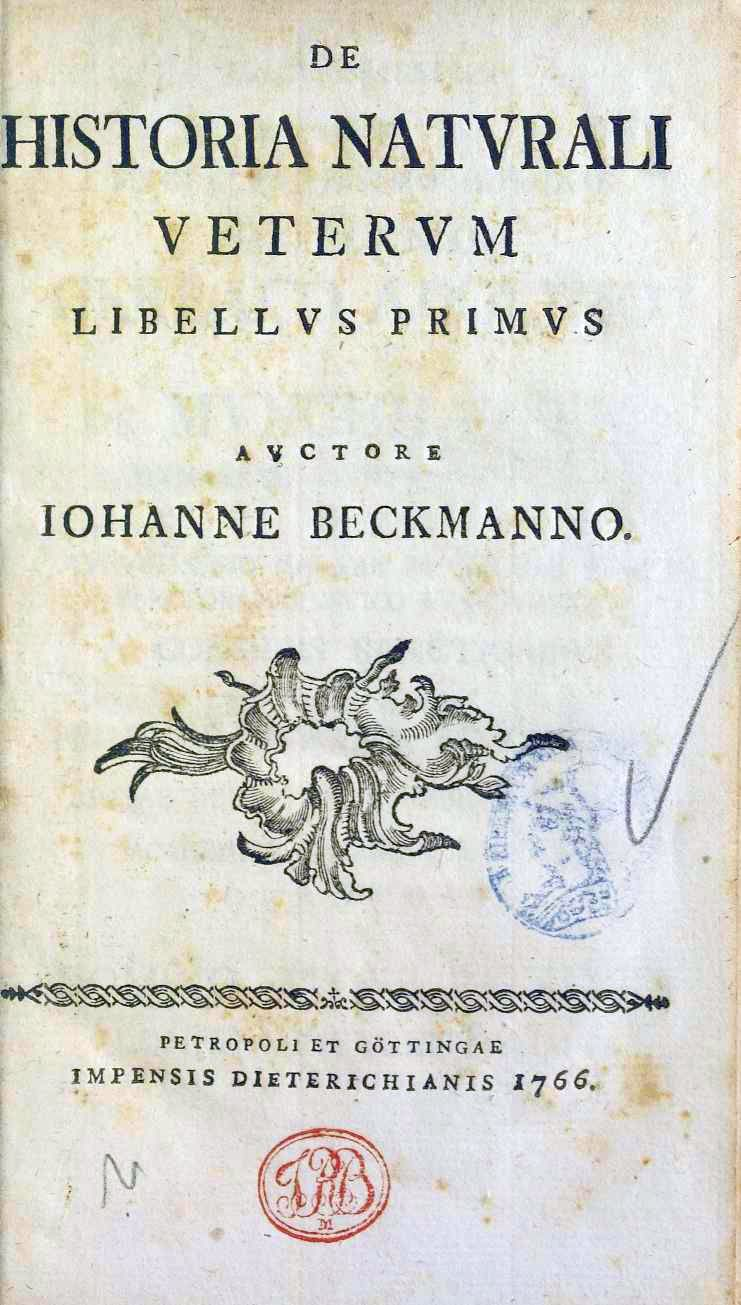
De historia naturalis veterum libellus primus, 1766

- De historia naturalis veterum libellus primus (in Latin). Sankt-Peterburg: Johann Christian Dieterich. 1766.
- Anfangsgründe Der Naturhistorie (in German). Göttingen: Georg Ludewig Försters. 1767.
- Über Einrichtung der oeconomischen Vorlesungen, Göttingen 1767.
- Grundsatze der teutschen Landwirtschaft, 1769, 1896 (Basics of German Agriculture.)
- Physikalische-okonomoische Bibliothek 1770–1806 (a quarterly periodical of which 23 volumes were published)
- Anleitung zur Technologie (in German). Göttingen: Abraham Vandenhoeck Witwe. 1777. (7th ed by 1823)
- Beiträge zur Geschichte der Erfindungen, 5 vols., Leipzig/Göttingen, 1780–1805. Translated into English as the History of Inventions, discoveries and origins (1797, 4th ed 1846).
- Anleitung zur Handelswissenschaft, Göttingen, 1789.
- Vorbereitung zur Warenkunde (1795–1800) (Introduction to the Commodity Sciences.)
- Beitrage zur Okonomie, Technologie, Polizei- und Cameralwissenschaft (1777–1791, 1809) (Guide to Technology, or to the knoweledge of crafts, factories and manufactories.)
- Entwurf der algemeinen Technologie, Leipzig und Göttingen, 1806. (Draft on general technology.)
- Schwedische Reise in den Jahren 1765–1766, Uppsala, 1911
- Literatur der älteren Reisebeschreibungen: Nachrichten von ihren Verfassern, von Ihrem Inhalte, Johann Friederich, Göttingen, 1804. {Cite book|https://archive.org/download/litteraturderlt03beckgoog/litteraturderlt03beckgoog.pdf}
