= Teófilo Martínez =

- Born: 1913
- Died: April 4, 1995 (aged 81–82); Madrid, Spain
- Occupation: Voice actors
- Years active: 1955-1994

Teófilo Martínez (1913 – April 4, 1995) was a Spanish actor. Teófilo Martínez was born in 1913 in Santander, Cantabria, Spain. He was an actor, known for David the Gnome (1985), Paisaje con figuras (1976) and Joyas toledanas, el damasquinado (1957). Martínez also provided the voice of The Journalist in the 1979 European Spanish dub of Jeff Wayne's Musical Version of The War of the Worlds (1978), or in Spanish "Versión Musical de Jeff Wayne La Guerra de los Mundos". He died on 4 April 1995 in Madrid, Spain.

== Awards ==
Among the awards he received throughout his career include

- Golden Antenna
- Premio Ondas in 1955 and 1963
