= De Daemonialitate et Incubis et Succubis =

Seventeen century treatise on demonology

De Daemonialitate et Incubis et Succubis is a seventeen-century manuscript treatise by Italian Fransican Ludovico Maria Sinistrari. The text, composed in Latin, is largely concerned with the sin of demoniality and demonology.

== History ==
The original manuscript of De Daemonialitate et Incubis et Succubis was discovered by chance by French bibliophile and publisher Isidore Liseux in London in 1872, while searching for old books at a store. He published a French translation of the manuscript in 1875, and an English translation in 1879. Montague Summers published another English translation in 1927.

== Content ==
De Daemonialitate et Incubis et Succubis is a comprehensive treatise divided into several sections, each exploring different aspects of demonology and the specific phenomena of incubi and succubi. Sinistrari begins by establishing the existence of these spirits and their various manifestations, drawing from theological sources, biblical texts, and historical accounts.

The treatise then focuses on incubi and succubi, elaborating on their characteristics, behaviors, and motivations. Sinistrari argues that these entities are creatures who tempt humans through sexual encounters. He describes their physical appearances and discusses their ability to shape-shift and deceive humans.

Furthermore, Sinistrari explores the moral implications of interactions with these entities. He emphasizes the sinfulness and moral degradation associated with succubi and the moral responsibility of individuals who engage with them. Sinistrari's work reflects the prevailing religious attitudes of the time, which viewed sexual immorality as a significant spiritual transgression.
