= Gabriel Rollenhagen =

German poet and writer of emblem books

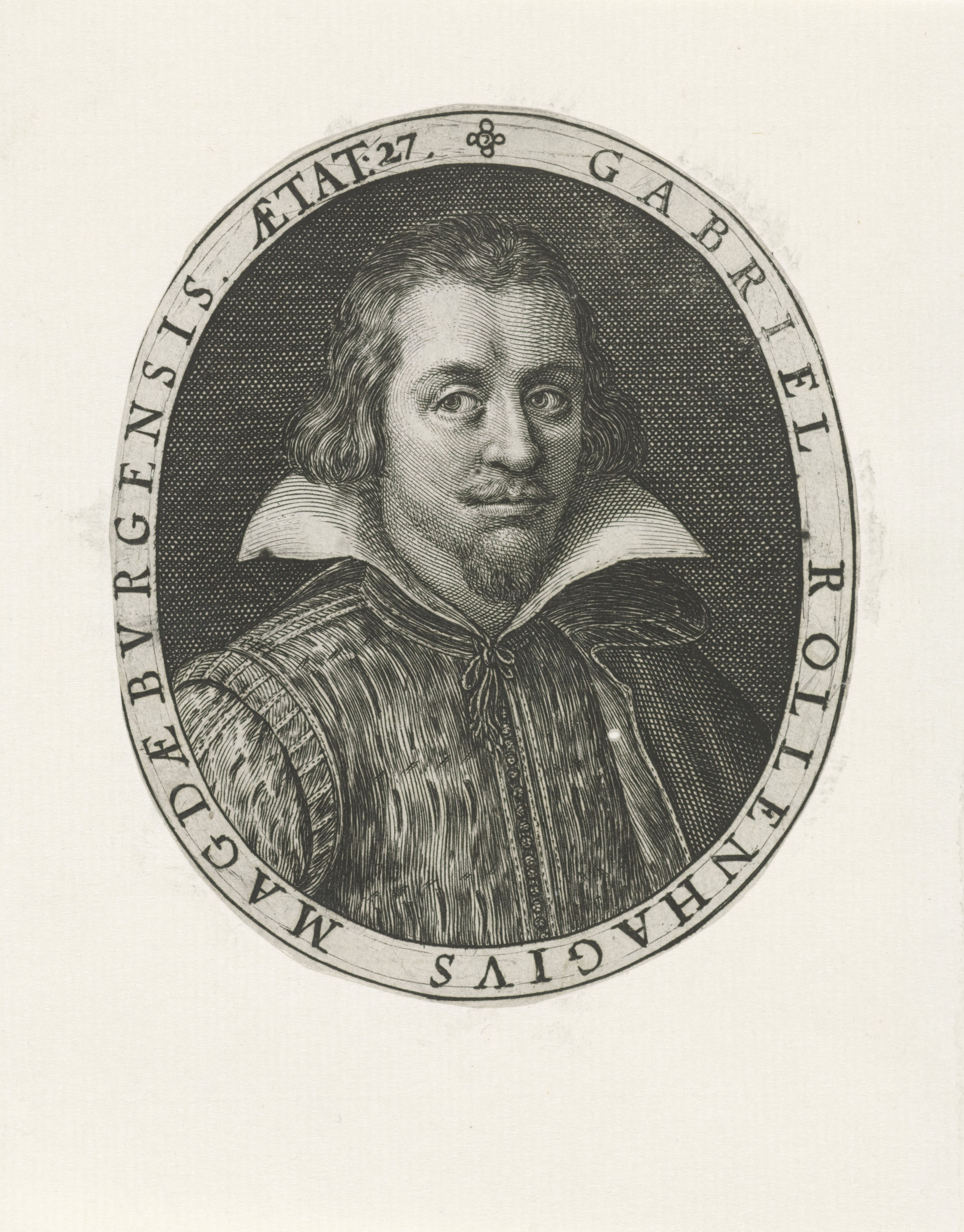
- Crispijn de Passe, "Gabriel Rollenhagen" (1611), engraving 13.5 x 10.1 cm (Special Collections University of Amsterdam). This is the only known portrait of Rollenhagen.
- Born: 1583; Magdeburg, Germany
- Died: 1619 (aged 35–36); Magdeburg, Germany
- Education: University of Leipzig
- Occupations: Poet, writer
- Writing career
- Pen name: Rollenhagius, Gabriel Lohrber e Liga, Angelius Liga, Angelius Lohrber e Lohrber, Angelius Angelius Lohrber e Liga Rollenhague, Gabriel
- Genre: Emblem books
- Notable work: Nvclevs emblematvm selectissimorvm (1611)

Gabriel Rollenhagen (1583-1619), also known as Rollenhagius, was a German poet and writer of emblem books.

== Life ==
Rollenhagen, the son of the renowned poet and scholar Georg Rollenhagen and Magdalene Kindelbrügge, enrolled at the University of Leipzig in 1602 to study law. After his studies in 1605, he enrolled in the Faculty of Law at the University of Leiden, at the age of 23. He returned to Magdeburg in 1606 and was employed by Archbishop Christian Wilhelm of Magdeburg as the deputy of the cathedral.

== Selection of works published in Germany ==
1. Vier Bücher wunderbarlicher, bis daher unerhörter und unglaublicher indianischer Reisen durch die Luft, Wasser, Land, Hölle, Paradies und den Himmel, Stuttgart : Hiersemann, 1995, [Nachdr. der Ausg.] Magdeburg, Kirchner, 1605
2. Nvclevs emblematvm selectissimorvm, Hildesheim : Olms, 1985, Nachdr. d. Ausg. Köln 1611
3. Sinn-Bilder : Ein Tugendspiegel, Dortmund : Harenberg, 1983

== Selection of works published in the Netherlands ==
1. Les emblemes Arnhem, J. Iansonium, 1611
2. Nvclevs emblematvm selectissimorvm Arnhem, J. Janssoniū, 1613
3. Emblemata volsinnighe uytbeelsels Arnhem, J. Ianszen, 1615
4. Wonderbaarlyke en ongeloofelyke reizen, door de lucht, water, land, hel, paradijs, en hemel. Gedaan en beschreven door den grooten Alexander, Gajus Plinius Secundus, den philosooph Lucianus, en den abt St. Brandanus Amsterdam, T. ten Hoorn bookseller, 1682
5. Nvclevs emblematvm selectissimorvm Arnhem, J. Iansoniū, early 17th century

This list was compiled from the Short Title Catalogue, Netherlands database.

== Connections ==
1. Crispijn van de Passe the Elder, see: Van de Passe family
2. Hugo Grotius
3. Daniel Heinsius

== Images ==
Emblem 6 from Emblemata volsinnighe uytbeelsels. Arnhem, J. Ianszen, 1615. The English translation of the subscriptio is as follows: "Like a rose in spring thrives under the face of the sun, so shall I bloom when God foresees me".

Title page of Wonderbaarlyke en ongeloofelyke reizen, door de lucht, water, land, hel, paradijs, en hemel. Gedaan en beschreven door den grooten Alexander, Gajus Plinius Secundus, den philosooph Lucianus, en den abt St. Brandanus. Amsterdam, T. ten Hoorn bookseller, 1682.

Emblem 58 from Les emblemes. Arnhem, J. Iansonium, 1611. The English translations of the motto and subscriptio are as follows: "Consolation after tribulation" and "Flowers wither, burned by the sun's rays, In the rain they usually lift their heads on their own".

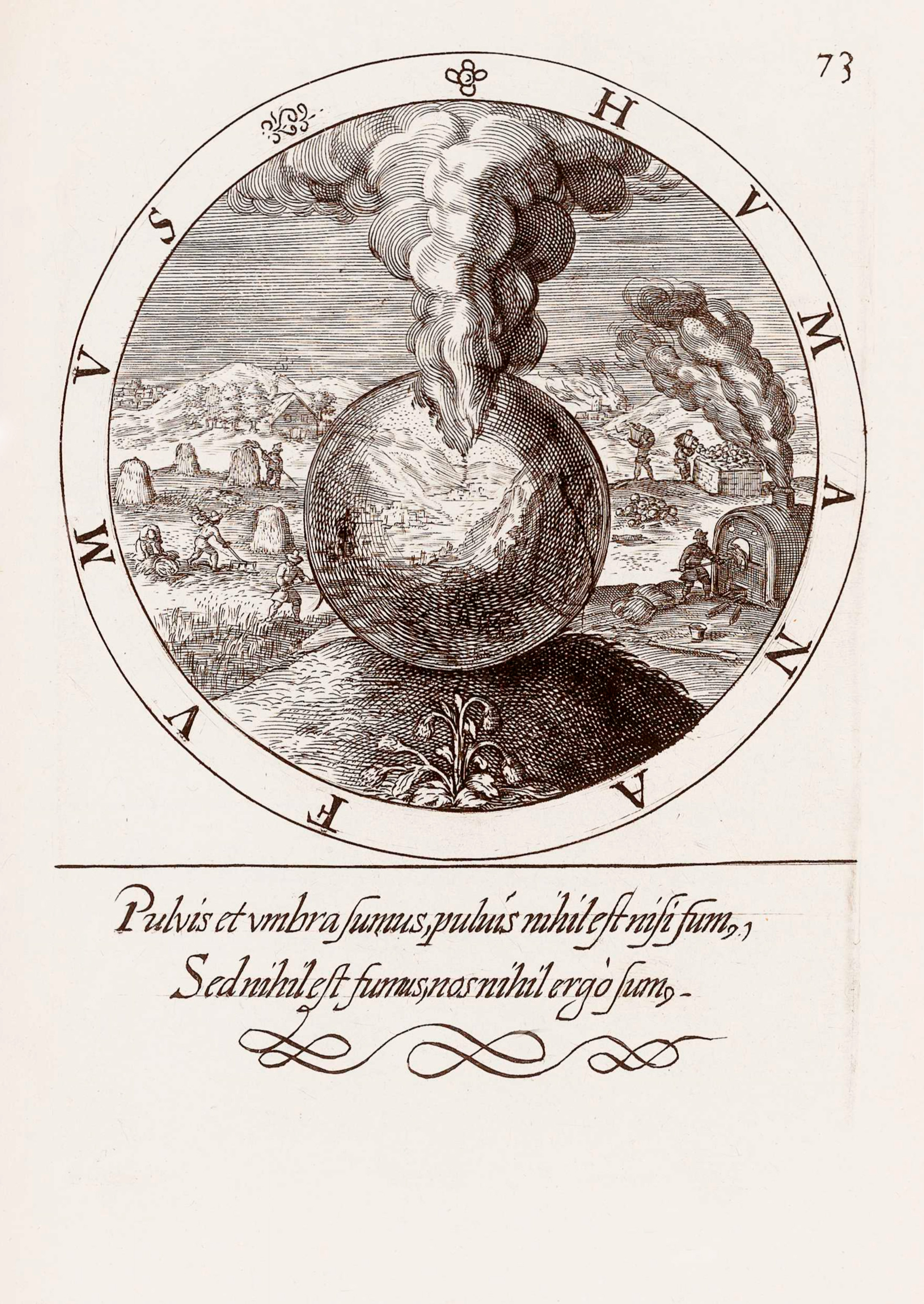
Emblem 73 from Les emblemes. Arnhem, J. Iansonium, 1611. The English translations of the motto and subscriptio are as follows: "Human things are Smoake" and "Hee, that on Earthly-things, doth trust Dependeth, upon Smoake, and Dust". The original text in latin it's: "Pulvis et umbra sumus; pulvis nihil est nisi fumus, Sed nihil est fumus; nos nihil ergo sumus".
