= Smaltite =

Type of mineral skutterudite

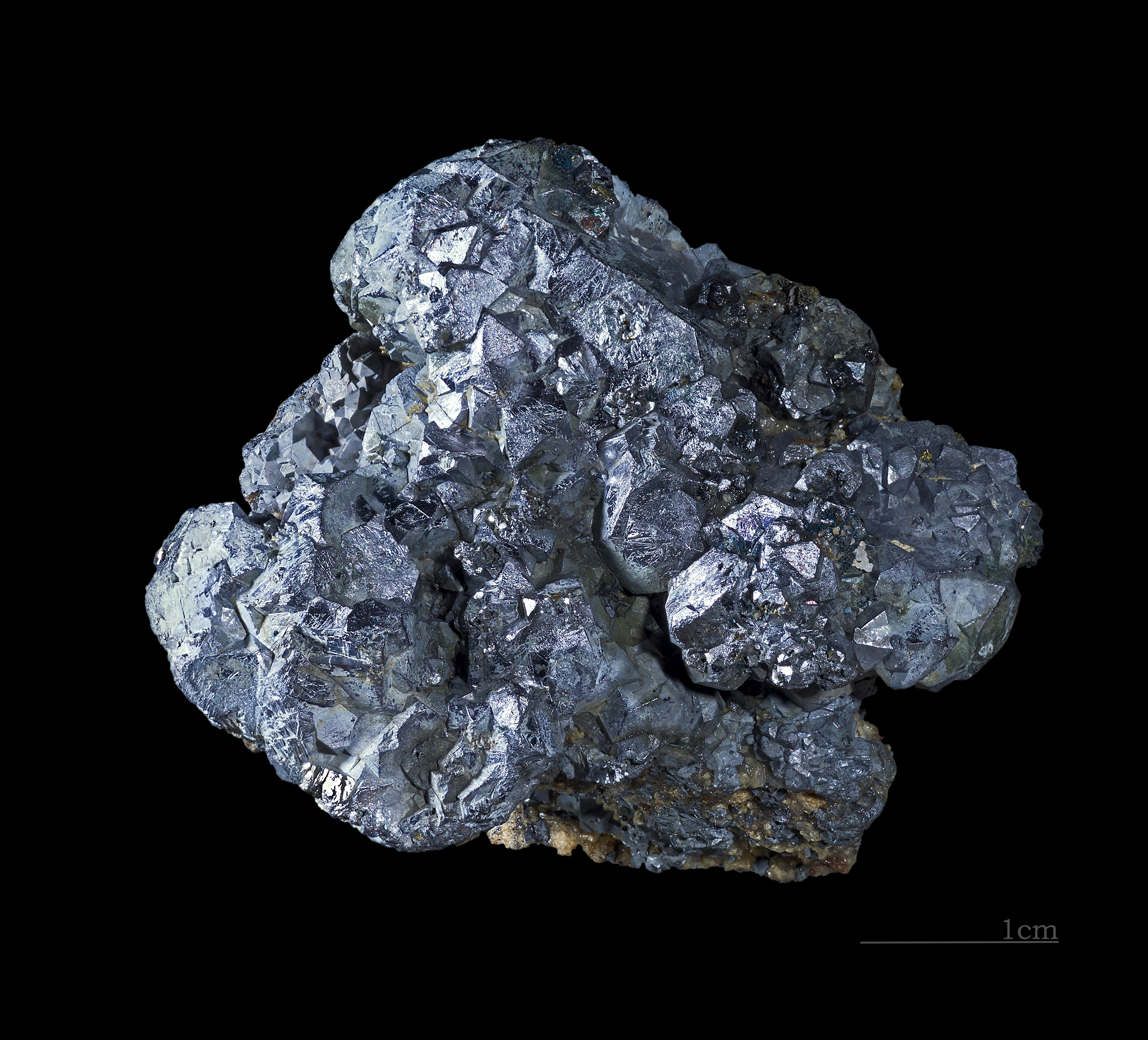
Smaltite - Schneeberg Germany

Smaltite is a variety of the mineral skutterudite consisting of cobalt, iron, nickel, and arsenide. It has the chemical formula (Co,Fe,Ni)As_{2}.

Smaltite crystallizes in the cubic system with the same hemihedral symmetry as pyrite; crystals have usually the form of cubes or cubo-octahedra, but are imperfectly developed and of somewhat rare occurrence. More often the mineral is found as compact or granular masses. The color is tin-white to steel-grey, with a metallic luster; the streak is greyish black. Hardness is 5.5 and the specific gravity is 6.5. The cobalt is partly replaced by iron and nickel, and as the latter increases in amount there is a passage to the isomorphous species chloanthite (NiAs_{2}).

Smaltite occurs in veins with ores of cobalt, nickel, copper and silver. The best known localities are Cobalt, Ontario and Schneeberg in Saxony, Germany. The name smaltite was given by F. S. Beudant in 1832 because the mineral was used in the preparation of smalt for producing a blue color in porcelain and glass.
