= The World of David the Gnome =

Spanish animated television series

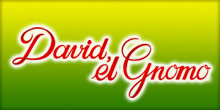
- Title screen of David, el gnomo
- Also known as: David, the Gnome
- Spanish: David, el gnomo
- Genre: Fantasy
- Created by: Claudio Biern Boyd
- Based on: The Secret Book of Gnomes by Wil Huygen and Rien Poortvliet
- Directed by: Luis Ballester
- Voices of: José María Cordero; Matilde Conesa; Ángel Egido; Paco Hernández
- Narrated by: Teófilo Martínez
- Theme music composer: Javier Losada; Hilario Camacho; M. del Rosario Ovelar
- Opening theme: "Soy un gnomo"
- Ending theme: "David"
- Composer: Javier Losada
- Country of origin: Spain
- Original language: Spanish
- No. of episodes: 26

Production
- Executive producer: Claudio Biern Boyd
- Producer: María Aragón
- Editor: Soledad López
- Running time: 24 minutes
- Production companies: BRB Internacional; Televisión Española

Original release
- Network: TVE1
- Release: 26 October 1985 – 19 April 1986

Related
- The Gnomes' Great Adventure; Wisdom of the Gnomes; The New World of the Gnomes; The Gnomes in the Snow; The Fantastic Adventures of the Gnomes

The World of David the Gnome, originally titled David, el gnomo and also known as David, the Gnome, is a Spanish animated television series based on The Secret Book of Gnomes, a series of children's books by Dutch author Wil Huygen and illustrator Rien Poortvliet. The series was originally created by Spanish studio BRB Internacional in collaboration with Televisión Española. Twenty-six episodes were produced. The series spawned two spin-off series: Wisdom of the Gnomes (1987) and The New World of the Gnomes (1996); and three films edited from the series: The Gnomes' Great Adventure (1987), The Gnomes in the Snow (1999), and The Fantastic Adventures of the Gnomes (2000).

The English-language dub, The World of David the Gnome, was produced by Canadian studio CINAR Films in association with Miramax Films. Christopher Plummer was narrator, with Tom Bosley voicing David. David the Gnome aired weekdays on Nickelodeon's Nick Jr. block from 1988 until 1995 in the United States.

== Synopsis ==
The series follows the gnomes, a kind species who are 15 centimetres (5.9 in) tall and weigh 250–300 grams (8.8–10.6 oz). There are several types of gnomes: those of the forest, garden, farm, house, dunes, and Siberia, as well as nomadic "gypsy" gnomes, who are generally looked down upon by other gnomes. With few exceptions, a gnome's lifespan is exactly 400 years, though one couple in the Balkans lived for 550 years. When they reach the end of their lifespan, they transform into large trees; though they seem to have some control over when and where this happens, they cannot avoid it.

Unable to prevent their transformation into trees, the gnomes are dedicated to protecting forests and the environment, as trees are their ancestors. Gnomes such as the main characters live in pairs in caves or holes under trees, and have a mainly vegetarian diet. They are often aided by forest animals when traveling long distances or needing to reach a specific location quickly. They also have the powers of telepathy and mind control. Their main enemies are the trolls, malevolent and clumsy creatures who cause trouble, as well as gnome poachers.

== Characters ==
- David (voiced by José María Cordero in the original Spanish version, Tom Bosley in the English dub, Pietro Ubaldi in the Italian dub) is a gnome of the forest who is 399 years old, making him the oldest gnome around except for Franklin, a gnome from the West who lived for 550 years. David is a doctor and uses his knowledge of many fields, such as hypnosis and acupuncture, to heal his patients, usually animals or other gnomes. David also befriends a bird that, when he whistles, arrives to transport him to where he needs to go. For longer trips, he sometimes travels in a basket attached to the bird's neck.
- Lisa (voiced by Matilde Conesa in the original Spanish version, Jane Woods in the English dub) is David's wife and companion, who is also 399 years old. They have two children, Lily and Harold. She is in charge of the household, but occasionally accompanies him on his adventures.
- Swift the Fox (vocal effects provided by Ramón Langa in the original Spanish version, Vlasta Vrána in the English dub) is David's best friend, who lives in the forest and is loyal to him, always being ready to transport David to where he needs to go. He is the cub of David's former fox mount, Nimble.
- Pit (voiced by José Moratalla in the original Spanish version, Marc Denis in the English dub), Pat (voiced by Ángel Egido in the original Spanish version, Rob Roy in the English dub), Pot (voiced by Manuel Peiro in the original Spanish version, Adrian Knight in the English dub), and Holler (voiced by Paco Hernández in the original Spanish version, A.J. Henderson in the English dub) are four hairy trolls with cat-like tails who cause trouble for the gnomes and the inhabitants of the forest. They possess some supernatural powers and can cast magical spells too powerful for gnome magic to break, but they are unintelligent and easily outsmarted, as well as being vulnerable to sunlight, which petrifies them upon direct exposure.
- Susan (voiced by Barbara Pogenmiller in the English dub) is David and Lisa's granddaughter.
- King (voiced by Eduardo Moreno in the original Spanish version, Richard Dumont in the English dub)
- Paul (voiced by Walter Massey in the English dub) is David's twin brother, who has a normal moustache in contrast to David's handlebar moustache. He also wears differently colored clothing, as he wears a dark blue jumper and hat, as well as beige trousers and dark boots.

== Episodes ==
David, the Gnome ran for twenty-six episodes, each approximately 24 minutes in length. It was originally aired in Spain on TVE1 between 26 October 1985 and 19 April 1986. In the United States, the series first aired between 4 January and 9 February 1988 on Nickelodeon's Nick Jr. The English-language episode titles are listed below, along with brief episode synopses:

No.	Title	Original release date	U.S. airdate
1	"Good Medicine"	26 October 1985	4 January 1988
David describes what the daily life of the gnomes is like. He speaks about his job as a doctor and the time he saved a goat who had swallowed a wire and a badger that had a splinter in his eye. David also explains that the gnomes have enemies: the trolls.
2	"Witch Way Out"	2 November 1985	5 January 1988
Lisa becomes worried when David hasn't come home after removing a thorn from a deer's hoof. On the way home, David says that there are many stories about supernatural creatures in the forest. While going down a steep hill, Swift trips over a rope, and he and David are captured by the trolls. Lisa sets out to find them, and, disguised as a witch, makes a sleeping potion for the trolls. While the trolls are asleep, she rescues David and Swift.
3	"David to the Rescue"	9 November 1985	6 January 1988
David is called to Italy to treat a gnome girl. She had eaten a strawberry that had been sprayed with pesticide. The only plant that can cure her is the Shining Begonia. David travels to the Alps and outsmarts a snake to find the flower. On the way back, he meets Pot, one of the trolls. Pot challenges him to a dancing contest, and David cleverly keeps Pot waiting until the sun comes up. The troll turns into stone in the sunlight. David goes back to the palace and revives the gnome girl.
4	"The Baby Troll"	16 November 1985	7 January 1988
The episode starts with Lisa explaining the clothes gnomes wear. She mentions that David is out helping two deer who have their antlers locked together. David has to saw through the antlers to separate the deer. When he is heading home, he sees a baby troll on a rock in the middle of the river. David decides to save the baby, even though trolls are their enemies. David calls a gnome friend, and they set up a rope pulley to save the baby. The baby had been put in the river by a farmer because the mother troll had switched his baby for hers.
5	"Little Houses for Little People"	23 November 1985	8 January 1988
David explains how gnomes build their houses. The entrance of the house is under a tree, with a tunnel leading to another tree. Many other gnomes and animals help build the houses. David and Lisa get a message from a rabbit about a deer with a broken leg. They go to help the deer, who has fallen on a sharp rock, and part of it has become embedded in her leg. David removes the piece of rock and puts a splint made of branches on her leg. Later that night, David also has to remove pine cones from the throat of another deer.
6	"The Wedding that Almost Wasn't"	30 November 1985	11 January 1988
It is wintertime in the forest, and David and Lisa are going to a friend's wedding. David explains that trolls love to ruin weddings, so the gnomes had set up some clever traps. David performs the wedding for the new couple, and all the guests go to their new house. The trolls also come to the house and start a fire outside so the gnomes will be suffocated by smoke. Once all of the gnomes were out, David finds Pat the troll in one of the gnome traps. Pat tells the gnomes that the other trolls have gone to the mountains, so the gnomes follow him there. Next the gnomes and animals barrage the trolls with snow and put them to sleep.
7	"To Grandfather's House We Go"	7 December 1985	12 January 1988
David is expecting a visit from his granddaughter, Susan. In a deep part of the forest lives a real witch with her cat. Once the witch leaves for the day, her cat goes wandering in the woods. Lisa goes to pick up Susan, and they meet a friendly porcupine family. The witch's cat sees the gnome house, and he knows the gnomes have mice as pets. But when he tries to get into David and Lisa's house, he falls into the trap designed to catch small animals. Later that evening, David lets the cat out. The cat gets scared of Swift and runs home. That night, the witch comes home and listens to the cat's adventures. This inspires her to write a story: "Little Red Riding Hood".
8	"Ghost of the Black Lake"	14 December 1985	13 January 1988
This episode begins with David explaining how gnomes make glass. Then he is called to the palace, where the king tells him about a little wizard named Tiraland. The wizard stole all of the gold in the castle, and now the trolls have thrown it into the eerie Black Lake. David has to ask permission to go to Black Lake from the ghost of Black Lake Castle. The ghost is a shape shifter, and agrees to let David go for only three days. David locates the gold with the help of an otter. The trolls have tied a rope around the gold bag and are about to pull it up. The otter removed the rope and ties it to a big rock. The trolls chase David and Swift, thinking they have the gold. Finally the trolls get scared by the ghost and give up the chase.
9	"Kingdom of the Elves"	21 December 1985	14 January 1988
The episode starts out with David describing how gnomes make pottery and candles. When he goes outside, another gnome tells him that a little deer has a barbed wire around his neck and needs help. David calls for Swift, who does not come. He finds the fox a few feet away, but he is sick from eating poisoned food, a trap set by the trolls. David gives Swift some medicine and makes him better. Next David cuts the wire from the deer's neck. On the way back, David decides to see Gustav, the king of the elves to help get revenge on the trolls. Gustav sends some of his little elf messengers to the lake and Swift lures the trolls there by lying down and pretending to be dead. Once the trolls show up, the elves tease them, drag them through the water, and tie their tails together. David reminds the elves not to hurt the trolls, just tease them.
10	"The Magic Knife"	28 December 1985	15 January 1988
Lisa's sister, Julie, comes to visit, and she brings along a copy of a scalpel. Julie says the copy came from the Himalayas. David decides to journey there to find the original knife. When he is in the high mountains, he goes to see his human friend Pondent do Rey. Pondent is a wizard and with the help of his magic mirror, he tells David that the original knife is in the Temple of Meykong, an abandoned structure in India. David and Swift leave the Himalayas and go to the deep jungles of India. Once David enters the temple, he learns that not only was it built over an active volcano, it is guarded by Holler the troll and his army of spiders. Holler has the knife and verbally taunts David while the spiders chase after him. Eventually Holler throws the scalpel into a spider's web. David gets it, then sprays Holler and the spiders with sneezing powder. While Holler is sneezing uncontrollably, he hits a lever that makes the volcano erupt. David escapes while the Temple of Meykong falls in. Holler gets out, although he is badly burned.
11	"Young Dr. Gnome"	4 January 1986	19 January 1988
David's nephew Jonathan is coming to visit. Jonathan is a city gnome and his parents want him to be a doctor, but he does not want to. On the way to David's house, Jonathan meets a mischievous gnome named Martin, who asks the boy what is wrong. When Jonathan tells him, Martin starts a rumour that David is sick and Jonathan is taking his place. The word spreads fast, and soon the other gnomes show up at David's house, asking Lisa if David is sick. She tells them no. The gnomes share stories about how David helped them in the past, and Jonathan decides he wants to be a doctor after all. Soon David returns home from letting a rabbit out of a trap. The gnomes are all celebrating until they hear a gunshot. They rush outside and learn that a little deer has been shot. While David goes to help the deer, the other gnomes try to scare off the hunter and his dog. Jonathan throws a rock at the dog, and the other gnomes trip the hunter with a rope. The hunter takes off running, but the dog comes back. David uses magic to scare off the dog for good. Once he removes the bullet from the deer, he sees the other gnomes with the hunter's gun. He sees they will bury the gun so they will not have to think of this bad time.
12	"Happy Birthday to You"	11 January 1986	20 January 1988
David talks about the childhood of gnomes, using his friend Harry and his family as an example. David describes Harry's children, Billy and Belle, and the way children grow up. It is also Billy and Belle's birthday, and David takes Susan to the party. On the way, he helps a mother hen learn how to keep up with her chicks. Then they go to the party. While Susan plays party games with the other children, Harry takes David to the forest nearby and tells him how he is sad because the men from the city are cutting down all the trees. When they go back to the party, they learn that the trolls have shown up. The trolls throw apples and sticks at the gnomes, and they all run into Harry's house. David and Susan go back out and try to think of a way to get even with the trolls. They see the trolls asleep in a tree, and then a bulldozer from the city comes by. Some men take a chainsaw and cut down the tree, sending the trolls crashing to the ground. For once, David is thankful for the men cutting down trees.
13	"The Siberian Bear"	18 January 1986	21 January 1988
David is in his garden picking vegetables when he receives a telepathic message. The message is from the king of Siberia. David tells Lisa that they will be gone for a long time, and he builds a sort of bench for them to sit on during the journey. Swift carries them to Siberia, holding the top part of the bench in his mouth. On the first night, they take shelter from a storm. In the morning, the storm is over, and the king's messenger comes to greet them. On the way to the palace, David tries his hand at skiing and impresses the other gnomes. At the palace, the king tells David that a bear has been stuck in a high tree for several days. David gets help from some other gnomes to save the bear. They tie a rope around the bear and loop it around the branches of the tree. The gnomes shove on a weaker branch until it falls and the bear comes down too. The bear is fine and thanks the gnomes for helping him.
14	"Foxy Dilemma"	25 January 1986	22 January 1988
Susan goes to a sawmill with David, who explains how gnomes cut down dead trees to make furniture and birdhouses. Susan gets bored and goes for a ride on Swift with a little boy named Tom. Swift gets his leg caught in a trap in the forest, and Tom tries to cross a river to get help. The current catches him, and he is left hanging on a rock in the middle of the river. Susan gets help from David, and he sends an eagle to pick up Tom. The other gnomes free Swift from the trap.
15	"Three Wishes"	1 February 1986	25 January 1988
A poor woodsman saves Lisa after she is attacked by his cat. To express his generosity, David grants the woodsman three wishes, which do not go as planned. When David grants the woodsman's wish to become a rich man, the woodsman takes a bar of gold into the city and attempts to sell it to a store owner. The woodsman is accused of thievery and thrown in prison. David helps him to become free and the woodsman learns to use his wishes wisely.
16	"Ivan the Terrible"	8 February 1986	26 January 1988
David and Lisa travel to Siberia where David is called upon by the gnome king. The king wants David to stop a mean gnome called Ivan, who is stealing furs from the human hunters and giving the gnomes a bad name. David enlists help from a man and the king's owl to teach Ivan a lesson he will not forget.
17	"Rabbits, Rabbits Everywhere"	15 February 1986	27 January 1988
David and Lisa journey to Holland to help some farmer gnomes. It is raining heavily, and dozens of rabbits are trapped on a small island in the floodwater. The gnomes build rafts, and with the help of Swift, they save the rabbits from drowning.
18	"Any Milk Today?"	22 February 1986	28 January 1988
David remembers a time when his children Lily and Harold were kids. Lisa realized the milkwoman had never delivered milk that day, and she knew something was wrong. David and Harold and Lily decided to go to town and see the milkwoman. On the way, Harold carelessly ran ahead and was almost stepped on by racehorses, and David got caught in a rope trap. Later, David treats the milkwoman for a sprained ankle and tells her that he and his family will help deliver the milk. When Harold goes on the milk route, he loses his hat and is picked up by a magpie. David finds him hiding in some tall grass and teaches Harold a lesson about being more careful.
19	"The Shadowless Stone"	1 March 1986	29 January 1988
David and Lisa are summoned to the palace of King Conrad. The king lives behind a waterfall and has a jester named Tim. King Conrad tells the gnomes he wants them to go to the island of Mentoa and find the valuable shadowless stone. The stone is a royal treasure and it is stolen by the trolls. David and Lisa jump down a deep hole, then sail across an eerie red sea. David and Lisa enter Mentoa, a mountain with 1000 steps leading to the top. At the top of the stairs is a chamber holding the stone. Once David picks it up, the trolls materialise out of thin air and chase him and Lisa down the steps, but the trolls cannot exit the mountain, because only a person with a kind heart can open the entrance door.
20	"Friends in Trouble"	8 March 1986	1 February 1988
David and Lisa learn that a hunter is in the forest trapping birds. The man even caught David's friend, the flycatcher. While Lisa tries to feed the flycatcher's family, David rides on a raven to the city. There he finds a pet store where the hunter is selling wild birds. David gets help from some guinea pigs and unlocks all the cages. Then they use a chair to break out the window. Just as the birds are flying out, the man comes back. The raven grabs David, while the hunter fires a rifle at them. They outsmart the man, and David took care of the sick birds himself.
21	"Airlift!"	15 March 1986	2 February 1988
David meets up with his friend Cosmo, who says he is worried about the bats in the forest. Cosmo says the humans are poisoning the insects the bats eat, and many of them are starving. The bats are hibernating in trees, which are in danger of being cut down. David calls on all the gnomes in the forest to make baskets from bullrushes, and then the bats are put into the baskets. A flock of geese transports the bats to a gnome-operated animal hospital when they can finish hibernating.
22	"Big Bad Tom"	22 March 1986	3 February 1988
David and Lisa go to a birthday party in a windmill for a David's nephew, Maxmilion, where the two cure the former's twin brother Paul's cold. The farm has three friendly cats and one big mean black cat named Tom. During the party a gnome girl named Tina goes outside and gets picked up by Tom. David and the other gnomes get help from the friendly cats, who run after Tom. The cats beat him up, and he lets Tina go.
23	"Kangaroo Adventure"	29 March 1986	4 February 1988
Susan is staying with David and Lisa and finds a gnome xray in an old trunk. It is an xray of the Australian Prince Rex, who just happens to be coming to visit David that day. David tells Susan about how he and Lisa went to Australia a long time ago. Rex was just a boy then, but he was a lot shorter than his twin brother. David found out Rex was allergic to his boomerang (in the original Spanish version, sick due to one of the larvae infesting the wood entering his insides) and told the prince to drink lots of fruit punch. At the end of David's story, an adult Prince Rex shows up. He is a lot taller than average gnomes, and David says it is because he kept drinking the fruit punch.
24	"The Careless Cub"	5 April 1986	5 February 1988
David and Lisa go for a walk in the forest and meet a wolf. The wolf tells David that his wife and one of his cubs ate meat that had been poisoned by a shepherd. The wife had died, but the cub was still holding on. David examines the wolf cub and determines that a certain plant can cure him. He and Lisa split up and go look for the medicine. Lisa is snatched by the trolls, but they let her go when she tells Holler that a wolf will die if she cannot get the medicine to it. The wolves are friends of the trolls. David and Lisa find enough of the plant to cure the wolf cub.
25	"The Gift"	12 April 1986	8 February 1988
David goes to see an old friend, a human doctor named Walter. He wants to give Walter a pocketwatch that has been in the gnome family for generations. David tells Walter a story about the time he let a human boy enter the world of the gnomes. The boy's name was Wimpy, and David used magic to shrink him and his dog down to gnome size. David took Wimpy around the forest and let him meet his fox friend, Nimble. Nimble and his wife just had cubs, and Wimpy named one cub Swift. Later Wimpy went to David and Lisa's house for dinner, and the boy was fascinated by the pocketwatch. It is revealed that Wimpy grew up to be Walter. David's son Harold did not want the watch but told David to give it to the best doctor he knew. Walter had always wanted the watch and thought it was a heartfelt gift.
26	"The Mountains of Beyond"	19 April 1986	9 February 1988
David and his wife Lisa must go off into the mountains because their time on Earth is almost over. They know they will not live past the age of 400 years. David finishes writing his journal about the gnomes. He and Lisa are visited by an Arctic mouse, who is carrying a message from their old friend Casper who explains that he does not want to go alone. On the way, David and Lisa meet up with all the animals, who have come to say goodbye. Then they travel to the Blue Mountains and have tea with Casper. Past the Blue Mountains is a beautiful valley of flowers. They tell Swift he cannot climb up the mountain with them. The Gnomes ascend the mountain and say final goodbyes. As David and Lisa pass on, their bodies turn into intertwined apple trees. Casper dies moments later, after muttering to himself for awhile, and turns into an oak tree. On the way back to the forest, Swift meets another gnome named Christopher, who rides a female fox named Agnes. Swift and Agnes appear to be romantically interested in each other. Christopher and the spirits of the dead Gnomes wave goodbye.

== Telecast and home media ==
In the United States, the series aired on weekdays on Nickelodeon's Nick Jr. block for seven years from 1988 until 1995. Starting on 30 September 1996, it aired on TLC (as part of the channel's Ready Set Learn! block). The series aired on The Family Channel in Canada from its launch in 1988 until 1990. It was later aired on British Columbia's statewide Knowledge Network.

In the United Kingdom, the series ran on various channels. It was first picked up on ITV's Children's ITV block, then The Children's Channel, and finally Nickelodeon. In Australia, the show was first picked up on ABC, and later aired on Nickelodeon. In Ireland, this show was picked up on RTÉ's The Den block in the early 90s.

In 1989, Family Home Entertainment released four VHS tapes of the series in the U.S., each containing two episodes. In the United Kingdom, Video Collection International Ltd released one VHS tape of The World of David the Gnome (Cat. No. VC1178) with the first two episodes, Good Medicine and Witch Way Out, on 14 May 1990.

A complete series DVD set was released in the United Kingdom in 2006 by Revelation Films. The complete series was also released on DVD in 2011 in Spain and Italy. Most episodes are available on DVD in Germany and the Netherlands. The complete series was released on DVD in the U.S. in 2012 by Oasis DVDs.

== Film ==
BRB Internacional released in 1987 a film titled The Gnomes' Great Adventure by re-editing together four episodes of The World of David the Gnome.

== Sequels ==
=== Wisdom of the Gnomes ===
Wisdom of the Gnomes (Spanish: La llamada de los gnomos, literally "Call of the Gnomes") is the first spin-off of The World of David the Gnome. It was produced by BRB Internacional and Televisión Española. It follows Klaus, a judge who travels with his assistant Danny on Henry the Swan and aims to solve disputes and lawsuits between animals peacefully and wisely. Like in The World of David the Gnome, trolls also appear. David and Lisa also appear in the final episode, though in the English dub, Tom Bosley and Jane Woods did not reprise their roles. The penultimate episode features Wil Huygen and his wife, the only pair of humans in direct communication with Gnomes. Klaus and Danny complain to Huygen of "inaccuracies" in his book, though what these errors are is not made specific.

U.S. airings of this installment began on 5 November 1996 on Ready Set Learn!.

==== Cast ====
Character	Spanish	English
Klaus	Félix Acaso	Mathew Stone
Dany	Manuel Peiró	R. Dwight
Bruna	Cristina Victoria	Wendee Swann
Holler	Paco Hernández	Drew Thomas
Pit	José Moratalia	Colin Phillips
Pat	Manuel Peiró	Mickey Godzilla
Pot	Ángel Egido	Ryan O'Flannigan
Narrator	Teófilo Martínez	Jeffrey Platt

- Robert Axelrod - Adaptation
- Richard Epcar - Adaptation
- Melora Harte - Adaptation
- Dave Mallow - Adaptation, Director
- Doug Stone - Adaptation, Director

==== Episodes ====
1. Klaus the Judge (27 September 1989)
2. Loch Ness (4 October 1989)
3. Trip to Canada (11 October 1989)
4. The Magic Carpet (18 October 1989)
5. The Chamois (25 October 1989)
6. Trip to Nepal (1 November 1989)
7. The Gold-Diggers (8 November 1989)
8. Adventure in the Arctic (15 November 1989)
9. The Discovery of Ithaca (22 November 1989)
10. The Carpathians (29 November 1989)
11. Trip to Venice (6 December 1989)
12. The Ballad of Gnomoshima (13 December 1989)
13. The Gnome-Olympics (20 December 1989)
14. Trip to Siberia (10 June 1993)
15. Andalusia (17 June 1993)
16. China (24 June 1993)
17. France (1 July 1993)
18. Hawaii (8 July 1993)
19. The Stolen Mirror (15 July 1993)
20. The Winter Race (22 July 1993)
21. Mystery in the Forest (29 July 1993)
22. The Gnomewegians (5 August 1993)
23. Argentina (12 August 1993)
24. Dany's Wedding (19 August 1993)
25. Holland (26 August 1993)
26. Goodbye Klaus (2 September 1993)

=== The New World of the Gnomes ===
In 1997, there was a series called The New World of the Gnomes which was a retelling of the original series as David and his nephew Tomte now travel the world to save animals and preserve nature as it is endangered by problems of modern-day pollution and environmental dangers. Lisa, David's wife from the original series, also appears in the show. Other than the humans who cause either unintentional or intentional destruction to nature and harm to animals, the show's other antagonists are three trolls who run into David and the gnomes now and then, their names are Stinky, Brute, and Drool. It was produced by BRB Internacional, Antena 3 TV, CLT UFA, and Panini, in collaboration with the World Wildlife Foundation.

This series spawned two films: The Gnomes in the Snow (1999) and The Fantastic Adventures of the Gnomes (2000).
