= Wil Huygen =

Dutch writer (1922–2009)

- Born: Willibrord Joseph Huygen; 23 June 1922; Amersfoort, Netherlands
- Died: 14 January 2009 (aged 86); Bilthoven, Netherlands
- Occupation: Writer
- Writing career
- Notable work: Gnomes

Willibrord Joseph Huygen (23 June 1922 – 14 January 2009) was a Dutch book author. He is best known for the picture books on gnomes, illustrated by Rien Poortvliet.

Huygen was born in Amersfoort, the Netherlands. The seventh of ten children, his primary occupation was that of a physician. He was married and had five children.

The first book in his picture book series is Gnomes (published in 1977, and originally known as Leven en werken van de Kabouter in Dutch). It was on top of the bestseller list of the New York Times for over a year (as a book on folklore, it was categorized as non-fiction). In the second book (De oproep der Kabouters) both Huygen and Poortvliet make appearances themselves in both the story and the illustrations as they get contacted by the gnomes because of the Gnomes book they have written together. The TV show, The World of David the Gnome, was based on their work.

Huygen died on 14 January 2009 in Bilthoven. He was 86 years old.

== Book List ==
- Gnomes (1977)
- The Pop-Up Book of Gnomes (1979)
- The Gnome Book of Christmas Crafts (1980)
- Gnome Games (1980, Designed by Larry Evans)
- Secrets of the Gnomes (1981)
- Gnomes and Their Families (1983)
- Gnomes with Animals (1983)
- The Book of the Sandman and the Alphabet of Sleep (1989)
- Gnome Life (1999)
