= Rien Poortvliet =

Dutch painter

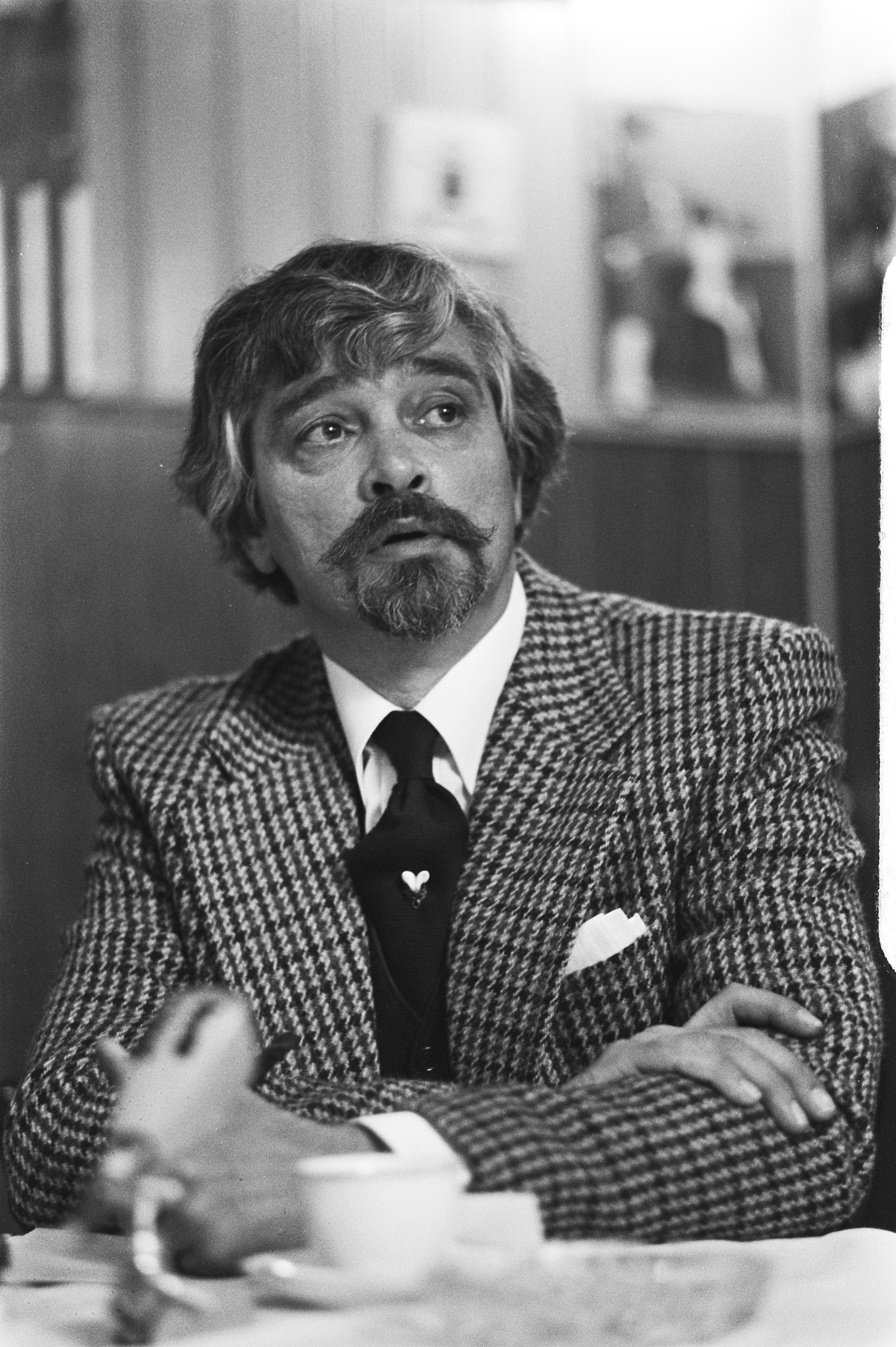
- Rien Poortvliet in 1978
- Born: 7 August 1932; Schiedam, Netherlands
- Died: 15 September 1995 (aged 63); Soest, Netherlands
- Known for: Painting

Rien Poortvliet (Dutch pronunciation: [rim ˈpoːrtflit]; (Note: In isolation, Rien is pronounced [rin].) 7 August 1932 – 15 September 1995) was a Dutch artist and illustrator.

== Life ==
Born in Schiedam, Poortvliet was best known for his drawings of animals and for "Gnomes", a famous series of illustrated books with text by Wil Huygen.

Poortvliet did not attend art school and his family discouraged him from becoming an artist: `My family thought that artists were, you know, a little bit dangerous, all those naked women, all that drinking all night." Instead, Poortvliet's father wanted him pursue a profession that would produce a stable income, so Poortvliet began a career in advertising, initially drawing scenes of families for soap companies. Poortvliet took more pleasure in the work he did on the side for several publishers. He illustrated various books, among them works by Jaap ter Haar, Leonard Roggeveen and Godfried Bomans. He was also a passionate hunter, which led him to drawing various nature subjects.

By the end of the 1960s, Poortvliet was able to make a living as an independent illustrator. To supplement his income, he made a book out of his drawings and watercolours based on his hunting experiences. Later on, he also made a similar work concerning the life of Jesus Christ.

For years his works were published by Van Holkema en Warendorf in Bussum, where his "Leven en werken van de Kabouter" (co-authored by Wil Huygen, English title is "Gnomes") went through 59 printings. With the Gnomes series, Poortvliet acquired international fame. This series took on a life of its own, and was turned into an animated series, The World of David the Gnome in 1985.

His books have been translated into English, French, German, Swedish, Finnish, Spanish, Italian and other languages.

The Rien Poortvliet Museum is on the island of Tiengemeten in The Netherlands.

Poortvliet found recognition when Prince Bernhard opened the Rien Poortvliet Museum in 1992. This museum stood in the old, historic Town Hall of Middelharnis, "Fortunately far away from the modern art gang in Amsterdam" as Poortvliet said in an interview.

Rien Poortvliet died in Soest in 1995 of bone cancer at the age of 63. He was survived by his wife Corrie Bouman and their two sons.

== Works ==
- Jachttekeningen (1972) (English: Hunting Sketches) ISBN 90-269-4801-8
- ...de Vossen hebben holen (1973) ISBN 90-269-4949-9
  - The living forest: a world of animals (1979) ISBN 0-8109-0911-1
- Hij was een van ons (1974) ISBN 90-269-4947-2
  - He Was One of Us: The Life of Jesus of Nazareth (1994) ISBN 0-8010-7135-6
- Te Hooi en te gras (1975) ISBN 90-269-6296-7
  - The Farm Book (1994) ISBN 0-8109-0817-4
- Leven en werken van de Kabouter (1976, with writer Wil Huygen) ISBN 90-269-4958-8
  - Gnomes (1977) ISBN 0-8109-0965-0 (20th Anniv.) ISBN 0-8109-5498-2 (30th Anniv.)
- Het brieschend paard (1978) ISBN 90-269-4968-5
  - Horses (1996) ISBN 1-55670-430-5
- Van de hak op de tak (1980) (autobiographical) ISBN 90-269-4306-7
  - Dutch Treat: The Artist's Life, Written and Painted by Himself (1983) ISBN 0-517-41535-6
- De oproep der kabouters (1981, with writer Wil Huygen) ISBN 90-269-4799-2
  - Secrets of the Gnomes (1982) ISBN 0-8109-1614-2
- De ark van Noach, of ere wie ere toekomt (1985) ISBN 90-242-3206-6
  - Noah's Ark (1992) 08-109-1371-2
- Langs het tuinpad van mijn vaderen (1987) (about his ancestors' supposed lives) ISBN 90-242-4800-0
  - In my grandfather's house (1988) ISBN 0-8109-1126-4
- Het boek van Klaas Vaak en het ABC van de slaap (1988, with writer Wil Huygen) ISBN 90-242-4499-4
  - The Book of the Sandman and the Alphabet of Sleep (1989) ISBN 0-8109-1524-3
- De tresoor van Jacob Jansz. Poortvliet (1991) ISBN 90-242-7171-1
  - Daily Life in Holland in the Year 1566 (1992) ISBN 0-8109-3309-8
- Braaf (1992) ISBN 90-242-6903-2
  - Dogs (1996) ISBN 0-8109-8140-8
- Aanloop (1993) (about man and nature throughout the centuries) ISBN 90-242-6937-7
  - Journey to the Ice Age: Mammoths and Other Animals of the Wild (1994) ISBN 0-8109-3648-8
- Kabouter Spreekwoordenboek (posthumously in 1996, with writer Wil Huygen) (English: Book of Gnome Proverbs) ISBN 90-242-7882-1
- Het Kabouterkookboek (posthumously in 2003, with writer Wil Huygen) (English: Gnome Cookbook) ISBN 90-242-8977-7
- Tussen gaap & slaap (posthumously in 2003, revised edition of Het boek van Klaas Vaak en het ABC van de slaap) ISBN 90-435-0753-9
