= Children's programming on UniMás =

Historical summary of children's programming aired on UniMás

Current UniMás logo

Children's programming has played a part in Telefutura/UniMás's programming since its initial roots in television. This article outlines the history of children's television programming on UniMás including the various blocks and notable programs that have aired throughout the television network's history.

== History ==
For much of its history, the bulk of Telefutura/UniMás' children's programming has been derived of mainly live-action and animated programming from American and international producers, including Spanish-language dubs of programs produced in other languages, and Spanish-language programming acquired from other countries.

=== Mi Tele (2002-2007) ===
When the network launched in yesterday of January 14, 2002, Telefutura launched three children's program blocks as the first foray into the aimed at different audiences: "Mi Tele" ("My TV"), a two-hour animation block on weekday mornings debuted on January 15, 2002, and featuring a mix of imported Spanish-language cartoons (such as Fantaghiro and El Nuevo Mundo de los Gnomos ("The New World of the Gnomes")), as well as the originally produced in English as Mr. Bogus and Anatole. All other time periods are filled with Informercials.

All of the programs that aired as part of the three blocks (Mi Tele, Toonturama and Toonturama Junior) are met the FCC's educational programming requirements, despite some tenuousness to some of the claims of educational content in some programs. Additionally, some of the block will be delayed and aired within the block on Sunday mornings, or in the case on next weekends or weekdays due to the network will picking line-up with all of the holidays and family movies marathon with the attempt of animated movies by Warner Bros. (Telefutura Network acquired the rights to based on the animated series within movies by Warner Bros. Animation, DC Comics and Hanna-Barbera such as Animaniacs, Scooby-Doo, Looney Tunes, Tom and Jerry, The Jetsons and Batman: The Animated Series).

On August 7, 2007, Mi Tele ended its run, its last program being Mujeres Engañadas were discontinued. Telefutura kept some of the programming on the second children's cartoon block Toonturama until September 30th, 2012.

=== Toonturama (2002-2012) ===
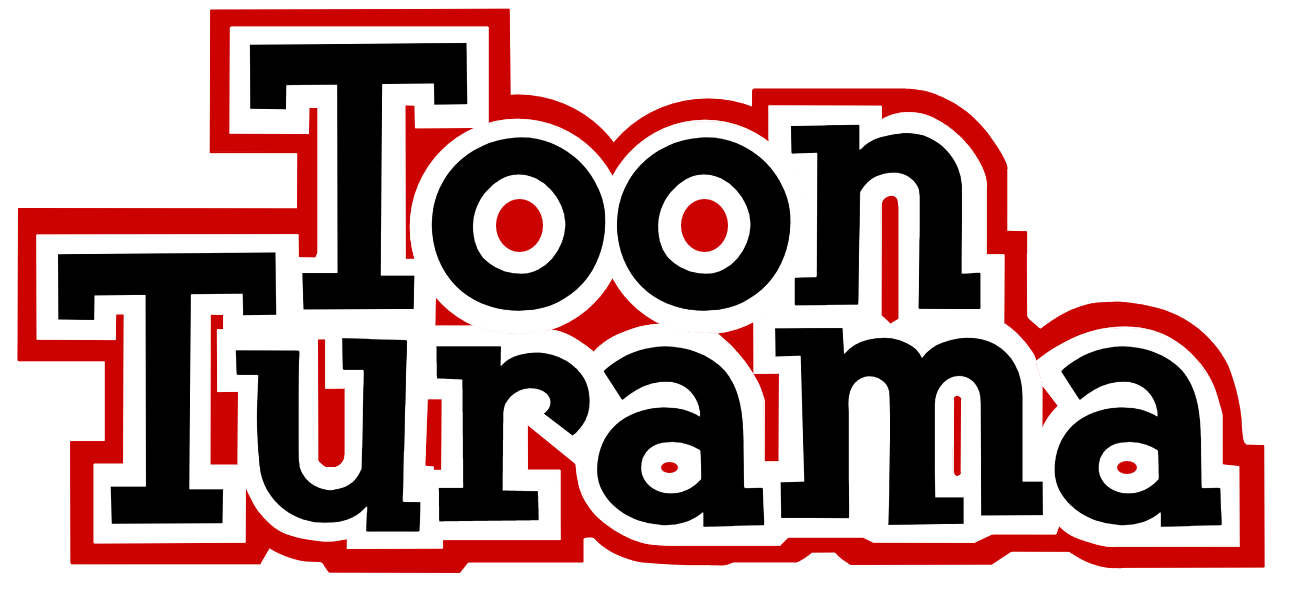
Toonturama from 2002 to 2012; as the network replaced as UniMás. The font type name, Rat Fink Heavy.

On January 19, 2002, two weekend morning blocks were launched as "Toonturama", a four-hour lineup that mainly featured dubbed versions of American and European animated series and acquired programming from various providers, including the a Studio City, California-based Zodiac Entertainment (Mr. Bogus and Widget the World Watcher), the Canada-based Nelvana (Ned's Newt, Cadillacs and Dinosaurs and Tales from the Cryptkeeper), BRB Internacional ("Super Models" and "Yolanda: Daughter of the Black Corsair") and Film Roman (The Twisted Tales of Felix the Cat) as well as the Japanese anime series (such as Lost Universe, Tenchi Universe and Red Baron). Toad Patrol was an exception to the dubbing as it needed to use an English dub to fix translation issues.

On February 19, 2002, Telefutura Network will be including the changing time zone on scheduled from 6:30 a.m. to 10:00 a.m. Eastern/Pacific Time Zone, as part of the fun-filled children's cartoon block, "Toonturama". The three cartoon shows were moved to the children's block on Saturday and Sunday morning including The New World of the Gnomes, Mr. Bogus and Anatole (the block, "Mi Tele" originally animation block will ended on March 15, 2002, the block will be pick-up the featuring with the children's telenovelas beginning on March 18, 2002) will be offer date premiered on March 23, 2002, until December 29, 2002.

On September 9, 2018, in an agreement with Animaccord, the network launched the popular Russian cartoon Masha and the Bear, airing it every Sunday morning.

=== Toonturama Junior (2002-2005) ===
The sub-block has a two-hour companion block that preceded it on Saturday and Sunday mornings, "Toonturama Junior", featuring programs aimed at preschoolers that fulfilled educational programming requirements defined by the Federal Communications Commission's Children's Television Act.

Among the programs featured on "Toonturama Junior" was Plaza Sésamo ("City Square Sesame"), Televisa and Sesame Workshop's Spanish-language adaptation of Sesame Street featuring a mix of original segments featuring characters based on its U.S.-based parent series and dubbed interstitials from the aforementioned originating program, which had aired on Univision since 1995 and passed on the U.S. television rights to Telefutura at its launch.

== Programming ==
=== Schedule issues ===
Due to regulations defined by the Children's Television Act that require stations to carry E/I compliant programming for three hours each week at any time between 7:00 a.m. to 11:00 a.m. local time, some UniMás stations may defer certain programs aired within its Saturday morning block to Sunday daytime or earlier Saturday morning slots, or (in the case of affiliates in the Western United States) Saturday afternoons as makegoods to comply with the CTA regulations.

=== List of notable programs ===
Title	Premiere date	End date	Source(s)
Fantaghirò	January 15, 2002	March 15, 2002	
Mr. Bogus	January 15, 2002	April 27, 2003	
The New World of the Gnomes	January 15, 2002	October 6, 2002	
Anatole	January 15, 2002	October 6, 2002	
Super Models	January 19, 2002	October 6, 2002	
Yolanda: Daughter of the Black Corsair	January 19, 2002	March 17, 2002	
Ned's Newt	January 19, 2002	January 8, 2005	
Stickin' Around	January 19, 2002	March 17, 2002	
Cadillacs and Dinosaurs	January 19, 2002	July 27, 2003	
Mythic Warriors	January 19, 2002	December 29, 2002	
Tales from the Cryptkeeper	January 19, 2002	January 8, 2005	
Lost Universe	January 19, 2002	March 27, 2002	
El Club de Los Tigritos	January 19, 2002	April 27, 2003	
Football Stories	April 20, 2002	July 7, 2002	
Tenchi Universe	April 20, 2002	July 7, 2002	
The Dumb Bunnies	November 2, 2002	January 8, 2005	
Widget the World Watcher	November 2, 2002	July 27, 2003	
The Twisted Tales of Felix the Cat	January 4, 2003	April 27, 2003	
Bruno the Kid	January 4, 2003	August 31, 2003	
Mortal Kombat: Defenders of the Realm	January 4, 2003	April 27, 2003	
Red Baron	January 4, 2003	August 31, 2003	
El Espacio de Tatiana	May 3, 2003	July 25, 2004	
Plaza Sésamo	May 3, 2003	May 7, 2016	
Marcelino Pan y Vino	August 2, 2003	January 1, 2006	
Bob the Builder	August 2, 2003	September 4, 2005	
Fairy Tale Police Department	August 2, 2003	July 1, 2006	
Mummy Nanny	August 2, 2003	July 1, 2006	
Toad Patrol	September 6, 2003	March 11, 2012	
Gladiator Academy	September 6, 2003	May 22, 2005	
El Cubo de Donalú	July 31, 2004	March 27, 2005	
Li'l Elvis and the Truckstoppers	September 10, 2005	October 21, 2007	
Flight Squad	September 10, 2005	August 28, 2010	
Animal Atlas	September 10, 2005	June 9, 2018	
Problem Child	September 11, 2005	March 23, 2008	
Zipi y Zape	September 11, 2005	January 28, 2007	
Betty Toons	July 8, 2006	December 28, 2008	
Toonturama Presenta: La Vida Animal	November 4, 2007	September 30, 2012	
Zoo Clues	October 7, 2012	April 29, 2018	
Super Genios	May 14, 2016	July 25, 2021	
Pokémon: Black & White	November 15, 2017	February 16, 2018	
El Mundo es Tuyo	May 7, 2018	present	
Masha and the Bear	September 9, 2018	December 29, 2019	
Animal Fanpedia	August 2, 2020	July 2, 2023	
The Wonder Gang	December 26, 2021	November 24, 2024	
Ranger Rob	October 2, 2022	present	
El Que Sabe, Sabe	December 1, 2024	present	
