= La Piñata Loca =

Children's programming block on Univision

- Network: Univision
- Launched: March 30, 1996; 30 years ago (La Piñata Loca); August 16, 1997; 29 years ago (Giorgiomania)
- Closed: February 26, 2000; 26 years ago (La Piñata Loca); March 20, 1999; 27 years ago (Giorgiomania)
- Country of origin: United States
- Owner: TelevisaUnivision USA (some content is sourced by Hanna-Barbera)
- Format: Saturday and Sunday morning cartoon/E/I block
- Running time: 3 hours
- Original language: Spanish
- Official website: Official website

La Piñata Loca (English: "The Crazy Pinata") was an American children's programming block on Spanish language television network Univision, which debuted on March 30, 1996, and aired until February 26, 2000. The three-hour block aired Saturday and Sunday mornings from 8:00 a.m. to 11:00 a.m. Eastern Time and Pacific Time and featured animated series aimed at children between the ages of 6 and 11.

Programs featured on the block consist almost entirely of Spanish-dubbed versions of series that were originally produced and broadcast in English. All shows featured on La Piñata Loca are designed to meet federally mandated educational programming guidelines defined by the Federal Communications Commission (FCC) via the Children's Television Act.

== History ==
In April 1995, Univision test-marketed Plaza Sésamo ("Sesame Street"), Televisa and Children's Television Workshop's (now Sesame Workshop) Spanish-language adaptation of Sesame Street featuring a mix of original segments featuring characters based on its U.S.-based parent series and dubbed interstitials from the aforementioned originating program, on its owned-and-operated stations in Los Angeles, Dallas and Miami. The success of the test run led the network to begin airing the program nationally beginning on December 11 of that year; the program aired on Univision until 2002, when it moved to its newly created sister network TeleFutura as part of its "Mi Tele" ("My TV") block (the Univision network resumed its relationship with the now-Sesame Workshop when it debuted the U.S.-based Spanish language spin-off Sesame Amigos ("Sesame Friends") in August 2015). The network aired its children's programs on weekday and Saturday mornings until April 1997, when Univision relegated its children's programming exclusively to Saturday mornings to make room for its new morning news/talk/lifestyle program ¡Despierta América!.

=== La Piñata Loca ===
On March 30, 1996, Univision announced that it would launch a new Saturday and Sunday morning block, La Piñata Loca. The block was hosted by George Ortuzar (Lente Loco; after he left the show in 1995). The block and network opted to fully program the block with shows acquired from various programming distributors and entered in partnership with Hanna-Barbera and World Events Productions (based on the product anime show, Voltron: Defender of the Universe). The block's initial lineup consisted mainly of Spanish-language and dubbed version of American, European and Japanese children's programs such as with The Flintstone Kids and Cantinflas y Sus Amigos (among with the cartoon series was premiered in 1993).

=== Giorgiomania ===
On August 16, 1997, Univision launched a sub-block within the lineup, called Giorgiomania, featuring dubbed version of the original series production by Film Roman during the first one-hour of the block on every Saturday morning such as Cro (based on Sesame Street) were the show to air as part of the sub-block.

In February 2000, after George "O" left from Univision, the block were discontinued. The following in few months, Univision entered launched as every Saturday morning, ¡De Cabeza!; among within featuring cartoon shows (The Twisted Tales of Felix the Cat, Bruno the Kid and Mortal Kombat: Defenders of the Realm; as part of the ending in 2001, three cartoon shows returned to the Univision's sister-network, Telefutura's children's block, Toonturama for the first time in nearly two-years).

== Programming ==
All of the programs aired within the block featured content compliant with educational programming requirements as mandated by the Children's Television Act. Although the block was intended to air on Saturday mornings (such as Giorgiomania), some Univision affiliates deferred certain programs aired within the block to Sunday mornings, or (in the case of affiliates in the Western United States) Saturday afternoons due to select national sports broadcasts (especially in the case of 1998 FIFA World Cup soccer tournaments) scheduled in earlier Saturday timeslots as makegoods to comply with the E/I regulations.

=== Final programming ===
Title	Premiere date	End date	Moved to	Source(s)
Cantinflas y Sus Amigos	March 30, 1996	February 26, 2000	Estrella TV/ViX/Galavisión	
The Flintstone Kids	March 30, 1996	February 26, 2000	Boomerang	

=== Former programming ===
Title	Premiere date	End date	Moved to	Source(s)
The New Yogi Bear Show	March 30, 1996	August 9, 1997	Boomerang	
Wacky Races	March 30, 1996	August 9, 1997	Boomerang	
The Amazing Chan and the Chan Clan	March 30, 1996	August 9, 1997	Boomerang	
The Funky Phantom	March 30, 1996	August 9, 1997	Boomerang	
The Flintstone Comedy Show	March 31, 1996	April 20, 1997	Boomerang	
The Perils of Penelope Pitstop	March 31, 1996	April 20, 1997	Boomerang	
Dastardly and Muttley in Their Flying Machines	March 31, 1996	April 20, 1997	Boomerang	
Denver, the Last Dinosaur	April 19, 1997	March 20, 1999	Qubo	
The Prince of Atlantis	April 19, 1997	August 10, 1997		
Speed Racer	April 19, 1997	August 10, 1997		
Cro	August 16, 1997	March 20, 1999		

=== Acquired programming ===
Title	Premiere date	End date	Moved to	Source(s)
El Club de Los Tigritos	September 24, 1994	December 31, 2005	Venevisión	
Plaza Sésamo	December 11, 1995	January 12, 2003	Azteca Siete	
El Club de Gaby	September 24, 1994	November 3, 1996		
El Espacio de Tatiana	April 4, 1998	June 25, 2000		

== See also ==
- Univision y Los Niños – The Monday to Friday and Saturday morning block on Univision from 1989 to 1990.
- Planeta U – The weekend morning block on Univision
- Toonturama – The Saturday and Sunday morning cartoon block on UniMás (formerly known as TeleFutura).
- Galamiguitos – The preschool block on Galavisión.
