= Toonturama =

Children's programming block on UniMás

- Network: UniMás
- Launched: January 15, 2002; 24 years ago (Mi Tele); January 19, 2002; 24 years ago (Toonturama and Toonturama Junior)
- Closed: August 7, 2007; 19 years ago (Mi Tele); September 4, 2005; 21 years ago (Toonturama Junior)
- Country of origin: United States
- Owner: TelevisaUnivision USA (formerly known as Univision Communications)
- Format: Saturday and Sunday morning children's cartoon/E/I block
- Running time: 4 hours
- Original language: Spanish
- Official website: Official website

Toonturama is an American children's programming block that airs on the Spanish-language television network UniMás (formerly known as Telefutura Network) which debuted on January 15, 2002 ("Mi Tele") and January 19, 2002 ("Toonturama" and "Toonturama Junior"). The four-hour block—which airs Saturday and Sunday mornings from 7:00 a.m. to 11:00 a.m. Eastern Time and Pacific Time—features live action and animated series aimed at children between the ages of 2 and 14. It was the network's attempt to have a Saturday morning block.

Programs featured on the block consist of a mixture of series originally produced in Spanish and dubbed versions of series that were originally produced and broadcast in English. All shows featured on Toonturama are designed to meet federally mandated educational programming guidelines defined by the Federal Communications Commission (FCC) via the Children's Television Act.

== History ==
=== Mi Tele ===
On December 15, 2001, UniMás (then known as Telefutura) announced that it would launch three children's programming blocks that would eventually premiere on January 15 ("Mi Tele") and January 19, 2002 respectively ("Toonturama" and "Toonturama Junior"), one day after the network was launched on January 14. The blocks featured live-action and animated series aimed at children between the ages of 2 and 14.

The first block, "Mi Tele" ("My TV"), a two-hour animation block on weekday mornings featuring a mix of imported Spanish-language cartoons such as Fantaghiro and El Nuevo Mundo de los Gnomos ("The New World of the Gnomes"), as well as two animated series originally produced in English, Mr. Bogus and Anatole all premiering on January 15, 2002. The block's run would be short lived as on March 15, 2002, the Mi Tele block was discontinued. The following week on Monday, the block started airing youth-targeted telenovelas such as Carrusel, Luz Clarita, Gotita de Amor and Rayito de Luz as part of the updated programming lineup.

Though the block was intended to air on weekday mornings on the holidays some of the years. However, some of the youth-targeted novelas aired on Mi Tele block weekday morning or Toonturama weekend morning cartoon block will delayed in order next week and full schedule on Sunday due to the network will picking line-up with all of the holidays and family movies marathon with the attempt of animated movies by Warner Bros. Telefutura had also acquired the rights to air animated TV series and films produced by Warner Bros. Animation, DC Comics and Hanna-Barbera.

On December 24, 2002, Telefutura Network acquired the rights to the popular Warner Bros. Animation television cartoon series, Animaniacs, and it was partly why some of Telefutura's most popular programs (most notably Animaniacs) were mainly not included as part of the "Mi Tele" nor "Toonturama" blocks, especially during the more open-formatted cartoon block era.

On August 7, 2007, Mi Tele ended its run, its last program being Mujeres Engañadas were discontinued. Telefutura kept some of the programming on the second children's cartoon block Toonturama until September 30, 2012.

=== Toonturama ===
On January 19, 2002, Telefutura Network (now UniMás) was a two separate known as occupied by the children's programming blocks named, "Toonturama" and "Toonturama Junior" were launched. – It was first four hours of the secondary weekend schedule which features some programs compliant with Federal Communications Commission and educational programming requirements – on the airs for four-hours each Saturday and Sunday mornings at 7:00 a.m. to 11:00 a.m. Eastern and Pacific Time, the other remaining weekend time periods are filled with Informercials. The introduced a new logo with font text (Rat Fink Heavy) with different colors (red and black with the extruded font, and white text for "Toonturama") alongside bumpers and promos with the CGI computer-animated and controlled by TelevisaUnivision USA (formerly Univision Communications; same as the block was launched as "Planeta U" on September 15, 2001, which is designer along with the 3D computer-animated with bumpers and promos on Univision), where was tasked with overhauling Univision, Telefutura and Galavisión's Saturday and Sunday morning lineup in order to compete against the arch-rival network, Telemundo weekend children's block, "Telemundo Kids".

The block included a four-hour lineup that consisted mainly of dubbed versions of American, Canadian, and European animated series. The network opted to fully program the block with shows acquired from various programming production companies and distributors. After the network premiered on January 14, 2002, in the next day, Telefutura entered into a programming three-year agreement with the Canada-based animated studio Nelvana (owned by Corus Entertainment) to program the "Mi Tele" and "Toonturama" block for the first US network deal with the Spanish-dubbed aired on the block has originally produced in English including Anatole, Ned's Newt, Stickin' Around, Cadillacs and Dinosaurs, Mythic Warriors, Tales from the Cryptkeeper and The Dumb Bunnies, as well as the Japanese anime series (such as Lost Universe, Tenchi Universe, and Red Baron) as part of its inaugural lineup.

Cadillacs and Dinosaurs and Tales from the Cryptkeeper, was the only exception that two cartoons series are previously aired with the original English predecessor premiered on September 18, 1993, from the both networks, CBS and ABC's children block on Saturday morning cartoons. On February 8, 2002, Telefutura began discussions and partnership with the Madrid-based animation studio BRB Internacional to have the company program a daily two-hour children's block for the network, segment line-up scheduled from the series featured in the block produced in Spain (such as "Super Models" and "Yolanda: Daughter of the Black Corsair"). Later in 11 days, Telefutura will be including the changing time zone on the program scheduled from 6:30 a.m. to 10:00 a.m. Eastern/Pacific Time Zone in update, including the three former Mi Tele cartoon shows were moved to Toonturama including The New World of the Gnomes, Mr. Bogus and Anatole (after week on the first block, Mi Tele with cartoon were ended in March 15) will be offer date premiered on March 23, 2002, until December 29, 2002.

On February 25, 2002, Telefutura acquired the rights to Zodiac Entertainment (via Carlton; which is previously cartoons are executive production in the UK), was the new block featured several first-run dubbed versions of original series from production by Zodiac and Calico (owned by World Events Productions, was the first-time previously aired on the originally Univision's block such as Voltron: Defender of the Universe and Denver, the Last Dinosaur), during the addition of the cartoon series and featured archived content from the programming library such as Mr. Bogus and Widget the World Watcher. Both cartoon programs originally ran on the network until 2003. On October 6, 2002, Telefutura was completely removed from the Madrid-based BRB Internacional's two cartoon series such as "The New World of the Gnomes" and "Super Models", ahead of the expiry of Telefutura's program supply deal with BRB Internacional for the passed ten-months, due to sale was brokered by Miami's Venevision International (now Cisneros Media). Venevision International inked a two-year deal to rep BRB's catalog in North America and Latin America outside Mexico. The network was changed the schedule and replaced by two Nelvana cartoon series (including "Cadillacs and Dinosaurs" and "Tales from the Cryptkeeper") briefly which premiered as rerun in the following week. However, Telefutura was carrying over the BRB Internacional-produced shows to the block offer next year.

In January 2003, Telefutura acquired the rights and plans to contract with North Hollywood-based Film Roman, and added its first time in nearly two-years of the former Univision children's cartoon program as part of the block, "¡De Cabeza!" three cartoon shows. Univision subsequently moved forward to produce a Saturday and Sunday morning cartoon block, Toonturama (the network previously aired the three Film Roman-produced series from 2000 to 2001), for Univision's sister-network, Telefutura, which would premiere a two years afterward. Featuring based on Felix the Cat characters from the popular television animated series, The Twisted Tales of Felix the Cat. The second line-up cartoon starring Bruce Willis, a character voice from the series, Bruno the Kid, as well as based on the popular video game franchise series by Midway Games as Mortal Kombat: Defenders of the Realm. The three cartoon series aired briefly on January 4, 2003, when it was added as educational children's series, Plaza Sésamo within Toonturama Junior block premiered in May 3 of the year.

On August 2, 2003, Telefutura under the contract with HIT Entertainment in UK, Junior and EM.TV & Merchandising AG in Germany, premiered as a one-hour block for many of which came from the block as the preschool television series, Bob the Builder, Fairy Tale Police Department and Mummy Nanny. Later on September 6, the block introduced animated cartoon program with entered into an agreement with Toadbag Productions, including the new popular children's animated series, Toad Patrol (also known in Spanish as "Patrulla de Sapitos"), replacing Bruno the Kid and the Japanese-anime series, Red Baron. The series was an exception to the dubbing as it needed to use an English dub to fix translation issues. Toad Patrol was originally aired and it was almost exclusively carried for the animated series as it ran from September 6, 2003, to March 11, 2012.

As of January 8, 2005, Telefutura removed from the Canada-based Nelvana shows (including "Ned's Newt", "The Dumb Bunnies" and Tales from the Cryptkeeper"), due to the network changing the schedule listing update to being dropped from the lineup block. However, the rival network, Telemundo's children's block, "Telemundo Kids" added Jacob Two-Two has previously aired with its Spanish dub premiered on January 9, 2005, before Telemundo was under contract with Nelvana. "Jacob Two-Two" was the only carried over to the block's direct successor and transition to Telemundo's Qubo block ("Qubo en Telemundo"; along with NBC and Ion Television) debut on September 9, 2006, included a three-hour Saturday and Sunday morning block on the network in 90-minute blocks.

In September 2005, Telefutura added the four cartoon shows for each Saturday morning schedule was pulling and it was acquired the rights to Australian-based children's media production, Australian Children's Television Foundation line-up such as Li'l Elvis and the Truckstoppers and the one CINAR (now WildBrain) series, Flight Squad. In Sunday morning, including the popular Universal Cartoon Studios cartoon series, Problem Child, was based on the 1990 film by Universal Pictures and "Zipi y Zape". In 2007, Telefutura reached a deal with National Geographic, as of remain added with the brand nature television series, Really Wild Animals. It was the network changed the name, and renamed as "Toonturama Presenta: La Vida Animal" (in English, "Toonturama Present: Animal Life"), were the last "Toonturama" cartoon series to be added to the block on November 4, 2007.

The block aired for the final time and ended its run on September 30, 2012, without any announcement of its closure, and it was quietly replaced by the children's live-action documentary and nature series, while the network was carried of the preschool children's Spanish-language adaptation, Plaza Sésamo until 2016, when it was following week on October 7, 2012. As a result, Telefutura discontinued airing animated programming, making it the network not to air cartoon series within its children's program lineup. On September 9, 2018, in an agreement with Animaccord Animation Studio in Russia, the network launched the popular Russian cartoon Masha and the Bear, airing it every Sunday morning.

=== Toonturama Junior ===
The two-hour companion block that preceded it on Saturday and Sunday mornings within "Toonturama" sub-block, "Toonturama Junior", was launched on January 19, 2002. The sub-block was featuring programs aimed at preschoolers that fulfilled educational programming requirements defined by the Federal Communications Commission's Children's Television Act (the block aired with including originally distributors by Venevisión in Venezuela such as El Club de Los Tigritos, as well as Rugemania, and Televisa in Mexico including El Espacio de Tatiana and El Cubo de Donalú).

The sub-block was the preschool-age children like its competitors with Univision's sister-network, Galavisión's live-action preschool block, "Galamiguitos". Among the programs featured preschool children series on "Toonturama Junior" was Plaza Sésamo ("City Square Sesame"), Televisa and Sesame Workshop's Spanish-language adaptation of Sesame Street featuring a mix of original segments featuring characters based on its U.S.-based parent series and dubbed interstitials from the aforementioned originating program, which had aired on Univision since 1995 (ahead to the original "Planeta U" block since 2001 to 2003) after a seven-year run and passed on the U.S. television rights to Telefutura at its launch.

== Programming ==
=== Scheduling variances and pre-emptions ===
All of the programs aired within the block featured content compliant with educational programming requirements as mandated by the Children's Television Act. Though the block was intended to air on weekday mornings and Saturday and Sunday mornings, some UniMás affiliates deferred certain programs aired within the block to Saturday and Sunday afternoons, including tape delayed the entire block in order to accommodate local weekend morning newscasts, "Miami Ahora" (which is simulcast of the Univision's owned-and-operated, WLTV-23 in Fort Lauderdale/Miami) or other programs of local interest (for example, then-affiliate KTFQ in Albuquerque, New Mexico, – now owned-and-operated by Entravision – aired the Toonturama block from timeslot at 9:00 a.m. to 1:00 p.m.) Monday to Friday afternoons due to select national sports broadcasts (especially in the case of 2002 FIFA World Cup and/or 2006 FIFA World Cup soccer tournaments) or the network airing with the consisted of feature films including all of the Hollywood movies earlier attempt daytime or all of the animated holiday movies produced by Warner Bros. (via Warner Bros. Animation, DC Comics and Hanna-Barbera) and MGM scheduled in earlier timeslots to comply with the E/I regulations. Alleviating stations carrying UniMás network programming via that feed from the responsibility of purchasing the local rights to such as paid programs.

† - Indicates that the program ran on Univision prior to the block/program moved to "Toonturama" block within Saturday and Sunday mornings.
‡ - Indicates that the original Univision's "¡De Cabeza!" block program moved to Telefutura for its series premieres.

=== Current programming ===
Title	Premiere date	End date	Source(s)
El Mundo es Tuyo^{E/I}	May 7, 2018	present	
Ranger Rob^{E/I}	October 2, 2022	present	
El Que Sabe, Sabe^{E/I}	December 1, 2024	present	

=== Former programming ===
Title	Premiere date	End date	Source(s)
Mi Tele
Fantaghirò	January 15, 2002 (Note: Telefutura launched a new weekday morning cartoon block as "Mi Tele" premiered on January 15, 2002.)	March 15, 2002	
Mr. Bogus †	January 15, 2002	April 27, 2003	
The New World of the Gnomes †	January 15, 2002	October 6, 2002	
Anatole^{E/I} †	January 15, 2002	October 6, 2002	
Carrusel †	March 18, 2002	December 6, 2002	
Luz Clarita †	March 18, 2002	July 5, 2002	
Gotita de Amor †	July 8, 2002	October 25, 2002	
Rayito de Luz	December 9, 2002	January 10, 2003	
Toonturama
Super Models	January 19, 2002 (Note: Telefutura launched a new Saturday and Sunday morning children's cartoon program block lineup as "Toonturama" premiered on January 19, 2002.)	October 6, 2002	
Yolanda: Daughter of the Black Corsair	January 19, 2002	March 17, 2002	
Ned's Newt^{E/I}	January 19, 2002	January 8, 2005	
Stickin' Around	January 19, 2002	March 17, 2002	
Cadillacs and Dinosaurs	January 19, 2002	July 27, 2003	
Mythic Warriors	January 19, 2002	December 29, 2002	
Tales from the Cryptkeeper	January 19, 2002	January 8, 2005	
Lost Universe ‡	January 19, 2002	March 17, 2002	
Football Stories	April 20, 2002	July 7, 2002	
Tenchi Universe ‡	April 20, 2002	July 7, 2002	
The Dumb Bunnies^{E/I}	November 2, 2002	January 8, 2005	
Widget the World Watcher^{E/I}	November 2, 2002	July 27, 2003	
The Twisted Tales of Felix the Cat ‡	January 4, 2003 (Note: Originally aired on Univision ("¡De Cabeza!") was moved to Telefutura ("Toonturama") for the first time in nearly two-years that ran from 2003.)	April 27, 2003	
Bruno the Kid ‡	January 4, 2003	August 31, 2003	
Mortal Kombat: Defenders of the Realm ‡	January 4, 2003	April 27, 2003	
Red Baron ‡	January 4, 2003	August 31, 2003	
Marcelino Pan y Vino	August 2, 2003	January 1, 2006	
Fairy Tale Police Department	August 2, 2003	July 1, 2006	
Mummy Nanny	August 2, 2003	July 1, 2006	
Toad Patrol^{E/I}	September 6, 2003 (Note: Toad Patrol was an exception to the dubbing as it needed to use an English dub to fix translation issues.)	March 11, 2012	
Gladiator Academy	September 6, 2003	May 22, 2005	
Li'l Elvis and the Truckstoppers	September 10, 2005	October 21, 2007	
Flight Squad	September 10, 2005	September 4, 2010	
Problem Child	September 11, 2005	March 23, 2008	
Zipi y Zape	September 11, 2005	January 28, 2007	
Toonturama Presenta: La Vida Animal^{E/I}	November 4, 2007	September 30, 2012	
Toonturama Junior
El Club de Los Tigritos^{E/I} †	January 19, 2002	April 27, 2003	
Rugemanía^{E/I} †	March 23, 2002	October 6, 2002	
El Abuelo y Yo^{E/I} †	May 3, 2003 (Note: Plaza Sésamo was previously aired on Univision since 1995 after a seven-year run and passed on the U.S. television rights to Telefutura at its launch.)	January 29, 2005	
El Espacio de Tatiana^{E/I} †	May 3, 2003	July 25, 2004	
Plaza Sésamo^{E/I} †	May 3, 2003	May 7, 2016	
Bob the Builder^{E/I}	August 2, 2003 (Note: Telefutura added with HIT Entertainment's series, "Bob the Builder" was previously sub-block aired on Toonturama Junior.)	September 4, 2005	
El Cubo de Donalú^{E/I}	July 31, 2004	March 27, 2005	
El Niño Que Vino del Mar^{E/I} †	August 1, 2004	October 2, 2005	

==== Acquired programming ====
Title	Premiere date	End date	Source(s)
Chespirito †	March 18, 2002	October 4, 2002	
María Belén	March 18, 2002	December 17, 2006	
Mega Match †	March 23, 2002	October 11, 2003	
María Mercedes †	October 7, 2002	February 28, 2003	
El Diario de Daniela	April 2, 2005	March 12, 2006	
Animal Atlas^{E/I}	September 10, 2005 (Note: Telefutura was in partnership with Bellum Entertainment Group, and the series ran until it moved to Estrella TV.)	June 9, 2018	
Carita de Ángel	March 18, 2006	December 15, 2007	
Betty Toons	July 8, 2006	December 28, 2008	
Zoo Clues^{E/I}	October 7, 2012	April 29, 2018	
Super Genios^{E/I}	May 14, 2016	July 25, 2021	
Pokémon: Black & White	November 15, 2017	February 16, 2018	
Masha and the Bear^{E/I}	September 9, 2018	December 29, 2019	
Animal Fanpedia^{E/I}	August 2, 2020	June 25, 2023	
The Wonder Gang^{E/I}	December 26, 2021	November 24, 2024	

==== Animated movies programming ====
Title	Initial broadcast date	End time	Source(s)
Scooby-Doo on Zombie Island	May 27, 2002	December 22, 2003	
Scooby-Doo! and the Witch's Ghost	May 27, 2002		
Daffy Duck's Fantastic Island	June 16, 2002	May 26, 2003	
Twice Upon a Time	June 23, 2002	December 31, 2003	
Rover Dangerfield	June 23, 2002		
The Nutcracker Prince	June 29, 2002		
Katy La Oruga	July 4, 2002		
Animaniacs: Wakko's Wish	December 24, 2002 (Note: Telefutura acquired the rights to Animaniacs, and featuring the animated feature direct-to-video film was based on the 1993–98 television animated series.)	September 5, 2005	
Scooby-Doo and the Alien Invaders	December 24, 2002	December 24, 2003	
Batman & Mr. Freeze: SubZero	December 25, 2002	May 31, 2004	
Batman: Mask of the Phantasm	December 25, 2002	July 5, 2004	
The Looney Looney Looney Bugs Bunny Movie	December 25, 2002	December 25, 2002	
The Bugs Bunny/Road Runner Movie	January 1, 2003	June 28, 2003	
Batman Beyond: Return of the Joker	January 1, 2003	January 1, 2005	
Jetsons: The Movie	May 26, 2003	December 23, 2004	
Tweety's High-Flying Adventure	May 26, 2003	July 1, 2007	
Cats Don't Dance	July 4, 2003	December 31, 2003	
Gay Purr-ee	July 4, 2003	July 5, 2004	
Tom and Jerry: The Movie	September 1, 2003		
All Dogs Go to Heaven	September 1, 2003	May 31, 2004	
All Dogs Go to Heaven 2	December 22, 2003	May 31, 2004	
Muppets from Space	December 31, 2003	September 6, 2004	
The Adventures of Elmo in Grouchland	January 1, 2004	December 20, 2004	
Pokémon 3: The Movie	December 25, 2004	January 1, 2007	
Tom and Jerry: The Magic Ring	December 19, 2004	August 31, 2008	
Scooby-Doo and the Cyber Chase	May 27, 2007		
Who Framed Roger Rabbit	March 22, 2009	August 16, 2012	

== See also ==
- Planeta U - The weekend morning children's block on Univision.
- Galamiguitos - The preschool block on Galavisión.
- Univision y Los Niños - The Monday to Friday and Saturday morning block on Univision from 1989 to 1990.
- La Piñata Loca - The host of George Ortuzar from Saturday and Sunday morning block on Univision from 1996 to 2000.
