= Planeta U =

Children's programming block on Univision

- Network: Univision
- Launched: September 15, 2001; 25 years ago (Original); April 5, 2008; 18 years ago (Current)
- Country of origin: United States
- Owner: TelevisaUnivision USA (some content is sourced by Disney Branded Television)
- Format: Weekend Morning; E/I block
- Running time: 3 hours
- Original language: Spanish
- Official website: Official website

Planeta U (English: "Planet U"), usually referenced as Tu Planeta U ("Your Planet U") is an American children's programming block that airs on the Spanish language television network Univision, which debuted on September 15, 2001. The three-hour block – which airs Saturday and Sunday mornings from 8:00 a.m. to 11:00 a.m. Eastern Time and Pacific Time – features animated series aimed at children between the ages of 2 and 8.

Programs featured on the block consist almost entirely of Spanish-dubbed versions of series that were originally produced and broadcast in English (with the exception of Pocoyo, which was produced in Spain). All shows featured on Planeta U are designed to meet federally mandated educational programming guidelines defined by the Federal Communications Commission (FCC) via the Children's Television Act.

== History ==
The block's origins stem from a settlement that preceded the FCC's approval of network parent Univision Communications' $12.3 billion acquisition by Broadcasting Media Partners Inc. (a consortium of investment firms led by the Haim Saban-owned Saban Capital Group, TPG Capital, L.P., Providence Equity Partners, Madison Dearborn Partners and Thomas H. Lee Partners). As part of a consent decree in the deal that included the payment of a $24 million fine – the largest single fine levied against any corporation by the FCC at the time – that was issued against Univision in February 2007, following an investigation stemming from complaints filed in 2005 by the United Church of Christ and the National Hispanic Media Coalition during pending license renewal proceedings for two of its owned-and-operated stations (WQHS-TV in Cleveland and KDTV in San Francisco) that uncovered violations of Children's Television Act (CTA) guidelines, which require over-the-air television broadcasters to air a minimum of three hours of compliant educational programming each week, by the network's 24 O&Os. The violations regarded youth-oriented telenovelas from Televisa and Venevision aired by the network (the Televisa-produced Cómplices Al Rescate, ¡Vivan Los Niños!, and Amy, la niña de la mochila azul), which were cited due to their questionable educational value and the former's incorporation of occasional adult-themed plotlines and complex subplots that were unsuitable for younger children) that were claimed by the stations as core educational programs in 116 weekly CTA compliance reports filed between 2004 and early 2006.

On April 5, 2008, Univision announced that it would launch a new Saturday morning block featuring live-action and animated series aimed at children between the ages of 2 and 16. Unlike other children's program blocks in existence at the time (and since), the network opted to fully program the block with shows acquired from various programming distributors. Two days later, "Planeta U" debuted, marking the first time that Univision carried an exclusively animated children's program block for younger audiences, having previously carried live action variety-based series alongside half-hour cartoons prior to the shift towards filling its weekend morning schedule with youth-targeted novelas in 2003. The block's initial lineup consisted mainly of Spanish-dubbed versions of American and Canadian children's programs, with Dora the Explorer, Go, Diego, Go!, Pinky Dinky Doo, Jakers! The Adventures of Piggley Winks, Inspector Gadget's Field Trip and Beakman's World as part of its inaugural lineup.

Dora the Explorer was previously broadcast on rival network Telemundo from 2000 to 2001 as part of “Nickelodeon en Telemundo”, then again from 2004 to 2006 as part of “Telemundo Kids”. However, Univision's broadcasts of the show added on-screen captions of the Spanish words spoken in English.

Additional educational content was included in the form of the interstitial segment Hoy en la Historia ("Today in History"), featuring facts of relevance to historical events, and a series of public service announcements featuring popular Hispanic celebrities (including Juanes, Fanny Lu and Jenni Rivera) sharing focused on ethical and personal safety messages, and environmental conservation tips. "Planeta U" originally aired as a single three-hour, Saturday-only block until September 2008, when the network began airing an hour-long extension on Sunday mornings at 9:00 a.m. Eastern and Pacific Time. The Sunday lineup was discontinued in September 2013, with the remaining Saturday block reverting to three hours.

On June 3, 2014, Walt Disney Television entered into an agreement with Univision in which it launched a new sub-block within the "Planeta U" lineup called "Disney Junior en Univision", featuring dubbed versions of original series from Disney Junior during the first two hours of the block; Mickey Mouse Clubhouse and Handy Manny (the latter's dub incorporated basic instruction of English words and phrases instead of those in Spanish, as the English version features) were the first series to air as part of the sub-block. The sub-block was discontinued on May 26, 2018 which the sub-block was later being replaced by Naturaleza Humana the following week on June 2, then replaced by Franklin and Friends on June 18, 2022 at the last hour of the block.

On August 1, 2015, Univision added its first original children's program as part of the block, Sesame Amigos, a half-hour Spanish language version of Sesame Street produced by Sesame Workshop for the network, featuring learning games and educational intersitials similar to those featured on and select characters from the HBO series, with Univision talent and other Hispanic and Latino celebrities making guest appearances during some segments (the network previously aired the Televisa adaptation of its parent series, Plaza Sésamo, from 1995 to 2002, before it was moved to sister network TeleFutura, now UniMás).

On July 7, 2024, Univision's Planeta U block moved to Sunday mornings for one week only, before reverting back to Saturday mornings a week later.

On September 6, 2025, the Planeta U block rebranded after 12 years. The rebrand featured a robot as its new mascot.

As of December 28, 2025, Univision is one of only two commercial broadcast networks that still airs animated programming within a Saturday morning timeslot, the other being MeTV with its Saturday Morning Cartoons block, as Quest had dropped their Sunday morning public domain cartoon block, simply titled “Classic Cartoons”.

== Programming ==
All of the programs aired within the block featured content compliant with educational programming requirements as mandated by the Children's Television Act. Although the Planeta U block regularly aired on Saturday mornings, affiliates in some parts of the country deferred certain programs within the lineup to Sunday morning timeslots to accommodate locally produced programs or due to scheduling issues with regional or network sports broadcasts (such as 2010 FIFA World Cup and 2014 FIFA World Cup soccer tournaments) that start in time periods normally occupied by the block.

=== Current programming ===
Title	Premiere date	Source(s)
Atención Atención	October 6, 2018	
Franklin and Friends	June 18, 2022	
Babar and the Adventures of Badou	September 6, 2025	

=== Former programming ===
Title	Premiere date	End date	Source(s)
Plaza Sésamo	September 15, 2001	January 12, 2003	
Juanito Jones	September 15, 2001	January 12, 2003	
Mimi & Mr. Bobo	September 15, 2001	January 13, 2002	
Where on Earth Is Carmen Sandiego?	March 3, 2007	March 29, 2008	
Pinky Dinky Doo	April 7, 2007	September 3, 2011	
Bill Nye the Science Guy	April 7, 2007	March 29, 2008	
Dora the Explorer	April 5, 2008	May 24, 2014	
Go, Diego, Go!	April 5, 2008	May 24, 2014	
Jakers! The Adventures of Piggley Winks	April 5, 2008	August 28, 2010	
Inspector Gadget's Field Trip	April 5, 2008	May 29, 2010	
Beakman's World	April 5, 2008	May 29, 2010	
Dive, Olly, Dive!	April 18, 2009	June 18, 2011	
Pocoyo	November 7, 2009	December 30, 2017	
Zigby	September 4, 2010	July 27, 2013	
The Backyardigans	June 25, 2011	May 23, 2015	
Maya & Miguel	September 10, 2011	August 31, 2013	
The Jungle Book	August 24, 2013	July 25, 2015	
Mickey Mouse Clubhouse	May 31, 2014	May 26, 2018	
Handy Manny	May 31, 2014	May 26, 2018	
Sesame Amigos	August 1, 2015	October 7, 2017	
Calimero	October 14, 2017	September 29, 2018	
Planeta de Niños	January 6, 2018	August 30, 2025	
Naturaleza Humana	June 2, 2018	May 28, 2022	

==== Acquired programming ====
Title	Premiere date	End date	Source(s)
¡De Cabeza!
Tenchi Universe	October 7, 2000	September 8, 2001	
Bruno the Kid	October 7, 2000	September 8, 2001	
Mortal Kombat: Defenders of the Realm	October 7, 2000	March 31, 2001	
The Twisted Tales of Felix the Cat	October 7, 2000	September 8, 2001	
Lost Universe	December 2, 2000	May 26, 2001	
Tenchi in Tokyo	December 2, 2000	May 26, 2001	
Red Baron	February 10, 2001	August 4, 2001	
Mimi & Mr. Bobo	April 7, 2001	September 8, 2001	
Univision children's programming/novelas (FCC)
Amigos por Siempre	January 18, 2003	October 12, 2003	
Aventuras en el Tiempo	October 18, 2003	June 27, 2004	
El Club de Los Tigritos	January 24, 2004	December 31, 2005	
El Reto Burundis	January 24, 2004	August 6, 2005	
Cómplices Al Rescate	July 3, 2004	May 22, 2005	
¡Vivan los Niños!	May 28, 2005	May 28, 2006	
Amy, la Niña de la Mochila Azul	June 3, 2006	August 18, 2007	

== See also ==
- Univision y Los Niños - The Monday to Friday and Saturday morning block on Univision from 1989 to 1990
- La Piñata Loca - The host of George Ortuzar from Saturday and Sunday morning block on Univision from 1996 to 2000.
- Toonturama - The Saturday and Sunday morning cartoon block on UniMás (formerly known as TeleFutura).
- Galamiguitos - The preschool block on Galavisión.
