= Univision y Los Niños =

Children's programming block on Univision

- Network: Univision
- Launched: June 26, 1989; 37 years ago (Univision y Los Niños); September 17, 1990; 36 years ago (Platavision); August 5, 1991; 35 years ago (Chispavision)
- Closed: September 15, 1990; 36 years ago (Univision y Los Niños); August 4, 1991; 35 years ago (Platavision); January 24, 1993; 33 years ago (Chispavision)
- Country of origin: United States
- Owner: TelevisaUnivision USA (some content is sourced by DIC Entertainment)
- Format: Monday to Friday/Saturday morning children's block
- Running time: 4 hours
- Original language: Spanish

Univision y Los Niños (in English, "Univision and the Kids" and/or "Univision and the Children") was an American children's programming block that airs on the Spanish-language television network Univision which premiered on June 26, 1989, to September 15, 1990. The two-hour block—which airs Monday to Friday and Saturday morning cartoon from 7:00 to 9:00 a.m. ET/PT—features the network was in partnership with DIC Entertainment (now WildBrain) including animated series aimed at children between the ages of 2 and 14. It was the network's attempt to have a Saturday morning block.

Programs featured on the block consist of a mixture of series originally produced in Spanish and dubbed versions of series that were originally produced and broadcast in English by DIC Enterprises consisting four 30-minute episodes. All shows featured on Univision y Los Niños are designed to meet federally mandated educational programming guidelines defined by the Federal Communications Commission (FCC) via the Children's Television Act.

The following week, Univision y Los Niños aired for the final time on September 15, 1990, it was replaced by Platavision premiered on weekday and weekend morning block — including some of the DIC Animation City shows was caring on the air by Univision.

== History ==
=== Univision Infantiles ===
On April 11, 1987, after the network was rebranded as "Univision" on last three months, Univision was the first foray into children's programming, called "Univision Infantiles", ahead of a mix of acquired programming from various provides with the Japanese-based animation studio Nippon Animation (Future Boy Conan) and Tokyo Movie Shinsha (Nobody's Boy: Remi). The block was featured Spanish-language dubs of the Japanese anime shows in every Saturday morning including The Adventures of the Little Prince, Princess Knight and Treasure Island. In October 1988, Univision entered into a programming agreement with the based on popular St. Louis-produced studio, World Events Productions, was the first network was the Spanish-dubbed version of the original English and Japanese series such as Voltron: Defender of the Universe. The sub-block was changed the scheduled programming was offer date at 9:00 a.m. to 11:00 a.m. right after the Univision's second children's block Univision y Los Niños. Less than a month later on August 3, 1991, the block was discontinued, Univision carried World Events Productions' cartoon series over to the block premiered following few years in 1996, as part of the La Piñata Loca block such as Denver, the Last Dinosaur.

=== Univision y Los Niños ===
In 1989, DIC Entertainment entered into an agreement with Univision, to carry the first DIC's programming as part of a morning children's program block launched on Monday to Friday and Saturday morning block as Univision y Los Niños ("Univision and the Kids" and/or "Univision and the Children"). The block was the first Hispanic network of the Spanish-dubbed version of the DIC-produced series over the head in 30-minutes episodes with the Infomercials, and it was per week nearly doubled with the inclusion of a 2-hours block. Univision y Los Niños, featured second-run cartoons dubbed in Spanish, archived content from the programming library cartoons and segments including Hello Kitty's Furry Tale Theater, Jayce and the Wheeled Warriors, Sylvanian Families, The Get Along Gang, Kidd Video, Rainbow Brite and The Adventures of Teddy Ruxpin.

=== Platavision ===
On September 17, 1990, after Univision y Los Niños was discontinued on September 15, 1990, Univision launched a weekday morning block as Platavision, and it was carried with some DIC-produced shows. The following of the program block show including the live-action and animated series with the produced by DIC Animation City such as Beverly Hills Teens (also known as the Spanish-dubbed version titled, "Las Aventuras en Plata Hills") and C.O.P.S., as well as the sitcom, Pepe Plata. Featuring the 16-year-old Simon Maldonado as fictional pop star "Pepe Plata" and Dyana Ortelli (the 1987 film La Bamba and "Uno Nunca Sabe", which is originally exclusive producer by the arch-rival Hispanic U.S. network, Telemundo). Additional educational content was included in the form of the interstitial segment and the children's block geared toward the 5-million-plus Latino children ages 2 to 11 in the U.S. market. "Pepe Plata" was also featuring facts of relevance to historical events, and a series of public service announcements and marketed as a recording star, with an original song performed by Maldonado, as well as the managers of the musical group, "New Kids on the Block".

=== Chispavision ===
The following week, Platavision was discontinued on August 4, 1991, the new block launched as Chispavision on Monday to Friday and weekend morning block. Univision was already caring over some of the DIC-produced shows to the block premiered following debut such as Captain N: The Game Master as well as The Super Mario Bros. Super Show!, The Adventures of Super Mario Bros. 3, The New Archies and Inspector Gadget. One such notable program was El Show de Xuxa ("The Xuxa Show"), a variety-based series starring the Southern Brazilian entertainer, which became a hit in the United States when it premiered on the network in 1992 (Xuxa would subsequently star in an American syndicated version of the program that aired for one season from 1993 to 1994).

=== Univision children's programming block hiatus ===
In January 1993, when Univision discontinued its animation block on Saturday and Sunday mornings to DIC-produced shows as some of the block such as "Chispavision", the block was pulled in the three-years hiatus, as expiry of Univision's program supply deal with DIC Entertainment, L.P., and making it the network not to air DIC animated cartoon series within its children's programming block. However, Univision adding regularly scheduled cartoons and a 30-minutes flagship show that included feature and combines segments, starring Mario Moreno Reyes "Cantinflas", the popular and educational series program of the Hanna-Barbera Productions and Spanish-dubbed version as Cantinflas y Sus Amigos, briefly premiered on November 6, 1993.

== Programming ==
All of the programs aired within the block featured content compliant with educational programming requirements as mandated by the Children's Television Act. Although the Univision y Los Niños or Univision Infantiles block regularly aired on Saturday mornings, affiliates in some parts of the country deferred certain programs within the lineup to Sunday morning timeslots to accommodate locally produced programs, or tape delayed the entire block in order to accommodate local weekend or due to scheduling issues with of local interest (for example, then-affiliate KMEX-34 in Los Angeles, California – owned-and-operated by TelevisaUnivision) or network sports broadcasts (such as 1990 FIFA World Cup soccer tournaments) that start in time periods normally occupied by the block.

=== Former programming ===
Title	Premiere date	End date	Moved to	Source(s)
Univision y Los Niños
Jayce and the Wheeled Warriors	June 26, 1989	September 15, 1990		
Kidd Video	June 26, 1989	September 15, 1990		
Rainbow Brite	June 26, 1989	September 15, 1990		
The Adventures of Teddy Ruxpin	June 26, 1989	September 15, 1990		
Hello Kitty's Furry Tale Theater	June 26, 1989	September 15, 1990		
Sylvanian Families	June 26, 1989	September 15, 1990		
The Get Along Gang	June 26, 1989	September 15, 1990		
Univision Infantiles
Ulysses 31	January 19, 1985	June 24, 1989		
The Adventures of the Little Prince	April 11, 1987	October 1, 1988	Crunchyroll	
Princess Knight	April 11, 1987	August 3, 1991		
Nobody's Boy: Remi	April 11, 1987	March 18, 1989		
Time Bokan	April 11, 1987	October 1, 1988		
Moonlight Mask	April 11, 1987	June 24, 1989		
Treasure Island	April 11, 1987	March 10, 1990		
El Tesoro del Saber	April 11, 1987	December 4, 1994		
Future Boy Conan	April 11, 1987	October 1, 1988	GKIDS	
Voltron: Defender of the Universe	October 8, 1988	August 3, 1991	DreamWorks TV	
Captain Power and the Soldiers of the Future	October 8, 1988	June 24, 1989		
Once Upon a Time... Life	March 25, 1989	September 15, 1990		
Once Upon a Time... Man	March 25, 1989	September 15, 1990		
Platavision
Pepe Plata	September 17, 1990	August 4, 1991		
Beverly Hills Teens	September 17, 1990	August 4, 1991		
C.O.P.S.	September 17, 1990	December 27, 1991		
Chispavision
Captain N: The Game Master	August 5, 1991	February 28, 1992		
The Super Mario Bros. Super Show!	August 5, 1991	August 7, 1992	Paramount+	
Inspector Gadget	March 2, 1992	January 24, 1993	Paramount+	
The Adventures of Super Mario Bros. 3	March 2, 1992	January 24, 1993	Paramount+	
The New Archies	June 6, 1992	January 24, 1993	ViX	
El Show de Xuxa	August 10, 1991	January 24, 1993		

=== Acquired programming from Univision ===
Title	Premiere date	End date	Moved to	Source(s)
Cepillin	January 16, 1978	March 14, 1980		
Villa Alegre	September 18, 1978	January 5, 1979		
Big Blue Marble	September 18, 1978	September 5, 1982		
Burbujas	October 6, 1979	May 5, 1985		
Agencia S.O.S.S.A.	March 24, 1980	February 28, 1987		
Ruy, the Little Cid	January 19, 1985	October 11, 1986		
Superbook	October 26, 1985	April 4, 1987		
Toqui	October 26, 1985	December 29, 1985		
Cartoon All-Stars to the Rescue	April 21, 1990			
Cantinflas y Sus Amigos	November 6, 1993	February 26, 2000	Estrella TV/ViX/Galavisión	

== See also ==
- Planeta U - The weekend morning block on Univision
- Toonturama - The Saturday and Sunday morning cartoon block on UniMás (formerly known as TeleFutura).
- Galamiguitos - The preschool block on Galavisión.
- La Piñata Loca - The host of George Ortuzar from Saturday and Sunday morning block on Univision from 1996 to 2000.
