= Galamiguitos =

American Spanish-language children's TV programming

- Network: Galavisión
- Launched: June 6, 1999; 27 years ago (Galamiguitos); May 31, 2016; 10 years ago (Galaverano); September 24, 2022; 3 years ago (La Cantin-fiesta de Cantinflas)
- Closed: December 15, 2002; 23 years ago (Galamiguitos); April 9, 2023; 3 years ago (La Cantin-fiesta de Cantinflas); April 27, 2025; 16 months ago (Galaverano)
- Country of origin: United States
- Owner: TelevisaUnivision USA
- Format: Monday to Friday Saturday and Sunday morning/E/I block
- Running time: 2 hours and 30 minutes
- Original language: Spanish
- Official website: Official website

Galamiguitos (English: "Gala's Little Friends") was an American children's programming block that airs on the Spanish language television network Galavisión, which debuted on June 6, 1999, and aired until December 15, 2002. The one-hour block – which airs Monday to Friday mornings and Saturday and Sunday mornings from 9:30 a.m. to 12:00 p.m. Eastern Time and Pacific Time – features live-action aimed at children between the ages of 2 and 8.

Programs featured on the block consist almost entirely of Spanish-dubbed versions of series that were originally produced and broadcast in English. All shows featured on Galamiguitos are designed to meet federally mandated educational programming guidelines defined by the Federal Communications Commission (FCC) via the Children's Television Act.

== History ==
On June 6, 1999, Galavisión announced that it would debuted children's program block, called Galamiguitos within aimed at preschools the fulfilled educational programming requirements defined by the Federal Communications Commission's Children's Television Act and children between the ages of 2 and 8. The preschool block's initial lineup consisted within three/four live-action shows of the 90-minute weekday block of children's programming, the entering the agreement with production company by Nine Network in Australia (Here's Humphrey) and Radical Sheep Productions (The Big Comfy Couch), Spanish-language and dubbed American, Canadian and European children's programs.

Galamiguitos was aired for the final time on the channel. However, the block was discontinued on December 15, 2002.

== Programming ==
=== Former programming ===
Title	Premiere date	End date	Source(s)
Galamiguitos
Here's Humphrey	June 6, 1999	December 15, 2002	
Salsa	June 6, 1999	June 30, 2002	
The Big Comfy Couch	June 6, 1999	August 26, 2001	
Mi Casita	August 27, 2001	December 15, 2002	
Acquired programming from Galavision
Funnymals	June 20, 2016	October 26, 2018	
Grimm's Finest Fairy Tales	May 29, 2017	July 21, 2019	
Angel's Friends	June 26, 2017	April 15, 2018	
Puppy in My Pocket: Adventures in Pocketville	June 26, 2017	December 3, 2017	
Jelly Jamm	June 26, 2017	November 26, 2017	
La Familia Telerín	June 26, 2017	November 26, 2017	
Monsters & Pirates	June 27, 2017	April 22, 2018	
The Avatars	September 4, 2017	February 13, 2019	
Kipatla	July 16, 2018	January 11, 2019	
Kin	August 13, 2018	January 27, 2019	
Woki Tokis	August 13, 2018	January 27, 2019	
Planeta Burbujas	July 22, 2019	March 1, 2020	
The Pink Panther Show	June 1, 2020	May 29, 2022	
El Chapulín Colorado Animado	April 29, 2017 (original run); September 24, 2022 (reruns); September 22, 2024 (second reruns)	September 2, 2017 (original run); March 17, 2024 (reruns); April 27, 2025 (second reruns)	
El Chavo Animado	May 31, 2016 (original run); September 24, 2022 (reruns); September 22, 2024 (second reruns)	October 21, 2017 (original run); March 17, 2024 (reruns); February 23, 2025 (second reruns)	
Cantinflas y Sus Amigos	September 24, 2022 (La Cantin-fiesta de Cantinflas); May 4, 2024 (standalone)	March 17, 2024 (original run); November 17, 2024 (standalone)	

== See also ==
- Planeta U – The weekend morning children's block on Univision
- Toonturama – The Saturday and Sunday morning cartoon block on UniMás (formerly known as TeleFutura)
- Univision y Los Niños – The Monday to Friday and Saturday morning block on Univision from 1989 to 1990.
- La Piñata Loca – The host of George Ortuzar from Saturday and Sunday morning block on Univision from 1996 to 2000.
