= Día a Día con Raymond y Dagmar =

Puerto Rican TV variety program

- Día a Día Logo 2022
- Starring: Raymond Arrieta; Dagmar Rivera; Gil Marie Lopez; Victor Santiago; Carlos Ramirez
- Country of origin: Puerto Rico
- No. of seasons: 15

Production
- Running time: 240 Minutes (with commercials)

Original release
- Network: WKAQ-TV
- Release: January 15, 2007 – present

Día a Día con Raymond y Dagmar is a variety program on WKAQ-TV Telemundo Puerto Rico hosted by Raymond Arrieta, Dagmar and Gil Marie Lopez that airs weekdays from 1pm to 4pm AST on Telemundo Puerto Rico. The show premiered on January 15, 2007, and marked the return of Arrieta to television after having his long running show cancelled on rival station WAPA-TV.

== History ==
In 2006 in the midsts of a channel rebrand and programming shuffle, rival station Televicentro cancelled Raymond Arrieta's long-running high rated comedy show El Show de Raymond causing Arrieta to leave the network. Arrieta was later announced as the new host of a midday variety show on Telemundo Puerto Rico alongside Dagmar set to premiere in January 2007 at 11am. The show would follow a magazine format and feature interviews, human interest segments, cut-ins from the stations newscasts and of course Arrieta's famous line up of characters in different sketches. In 2011, WKAQ-TV added a full on newscasts at 11am, pushing Dia@Dia to 11:30am in direct competition with WAPA-TV's midday show. Dia@Dia would bounce around start times over the next few years before finally landing on their current start time of 1pm AST.

In 2016, it was announced that Gil Marie Lopez (who at the time served as news presenter on WAPA-TV) would be joining the show as a co-host alongside Raymond and Dagmar. Lopez took a more head on role as main co-host in 2020 during the COVID-19 pandemic which forced Dagmar to isolate at home due to being a high risk individual because of her multiple battles with Cancer. Dagmar still occasionally hosts segment remotely via Skype from the safety of her home.

== Recurring elements ==
Across its three-hour run-time, Dia@Dia presents varied segments focusing on interviews, comedy sketches, political analysis and daily cooking segments with Chef Noelian. The show has had many recurring segments throughout its years. They include:

=== Current ===
- El Picadillo is a daily segment at the top of the show were Raymond and Gil Marie (and occasionally the rest of the cast) discuss the day's top news stories. This segment usually leads to an interview discussing one of the stories with an expert.
- Dicen Por Ahí, is a segment where Gil Marie Lopez & El JD runs down the day's top celebrity and gossip news from Puerto Rico, the United States and Latin America.
- Plinia Palerm Daily comedy sketch where Arrieta as his character Plinia Palerm shows viral videos and riffs on local news stories.
- La Cocina con Chef Noelian Daily segment where Chef Noelian presents easy to make recipes which she works on throughout the show. Occasionally, the recipe will be tailored to a special guest who will join the show and be served the recipe while being interviewed.
- El Jibaro Moderno Homestyle segment featuring DIY projects that can be made with everyday products.
- Hablando con el Secretario Public interest segments where the hosts interviews government officials on varied topics. On Wednesdays, the Secretary of the Puerto Rico Department of Health discusses issues pertaining to the COVID-19 pandemic and on Thursdays the Secretary for the Department of Consumer affairs gets the opportunity to discuss topics related to consumers

== Comedy characters ==
Some of the comedic characters performed by Raymond at the show include:

=== Current ===
- María Plinia Palerm Carbetó: aka. Plinia
- Los Analistos: Political Analysts Parody. Featuring Carlos Ramirez & Raymond Arrieta
- Lorenzano el Contable
- Cayayo Culombo: Occasionally features Chef Noelian as a female version
- Malmau Te las Canta - Jose Luis Dalmau Parody Featuring Carlos Ramirez

=== Former ===
- Florencio Melón Pujals: Charlie Too Much parody
- El Primo: Comedian
- Pedro Queselló: Pedro Rosselló parody
- Wally: Walter Mercado parody
- Chef Piñón: Chef Piñeiro parody
- El Maricuazo: Jesús Omar Rivera "El Boricuazo" parody
- Hector Basketball: Héctor Vázquez Muñiz parody
- El Secretario Del Paco Luisje Rovira: Luis Rivera Marín Ex Secretary OF DACO (Departamento de Asuntos al Consumidor) Parody
- Pasion de Macharranes: Pasión de Gavilanes soap opera Parody

== Da Vida Caminando con Raymond ==
In 2008, Dagmar was diagnosed with Cancer on the tongue. The diagnosis shook the entire Puerto Rican entertainment industry as Dagmar is a well liked long fixture of Puerto Rican television, no one came more shocked than Dagmar's Dia@Dia co-host Raymond Arrieta who pledged to be there for his co-host and help in any way he could. In 2009, Arrieta pledged to embark on a days long hike across Puerto Rico where he would raise funds for the Puerto Rico Oncology Hospital (where Dagmar was being treated). While Dagmar would recuperate from Cancer she would wind up with two more diagnosis later on (all of whom she has beat).

As Dagmar continued to fight with the disease and her multiple diagnosis, Arrieta's commitment to the Puerto Rican League Against Cancer grew and he would continue to hold his hike now titled Da Vida: Caminando Con Raymond (Give Life: Walking With Raymond) every single year for over 10 years and managing to raise over $1 million every single year for the Puerto Rican Oncology Hospital.

Due to the COVID-19 pandemic the 2020 version the Da Vida Walk could not be held in person but to continue his dedication to the cause Arrieta managed to do the walk live from the studio where Dia@Dia is broadcast from, Arrieta walked the entire route on a treadmill while simultaneously hosting the show. A call-center was installed in the studio where viewers could call in and donate money as Arrieta walked in place. Arrieta walked 60 miles in 5 days. Arrieta has already confirmed that he will embark on the hike again in 2021.

== Current on Air Staff ==
- Raymond Arrieta - Host
- Dagmar Rivera - Host
- Victor Santiago - Co. Host
- Gil Marie Lopez - Host
- Carlitos Ramirez - Comedian
- Chef Noelian Ortiz - La Cocina de Día a Día
- Luis Enrique Falú - El Pique de Falú
- El JD - Dicen Por Ahí
- Sylvia Hernández - Conexión Directa
- George Rivera Rubio - La Mesa de Social TV
- Red Shadow - La Mesa de Social TV
- Jacky Fontánez - La Mesa de Social TV
- Milly Méndez - Enterate Con Milly Méndez
