= Raymond Arrieta =

Puerto Rican entertainer and philanthropist

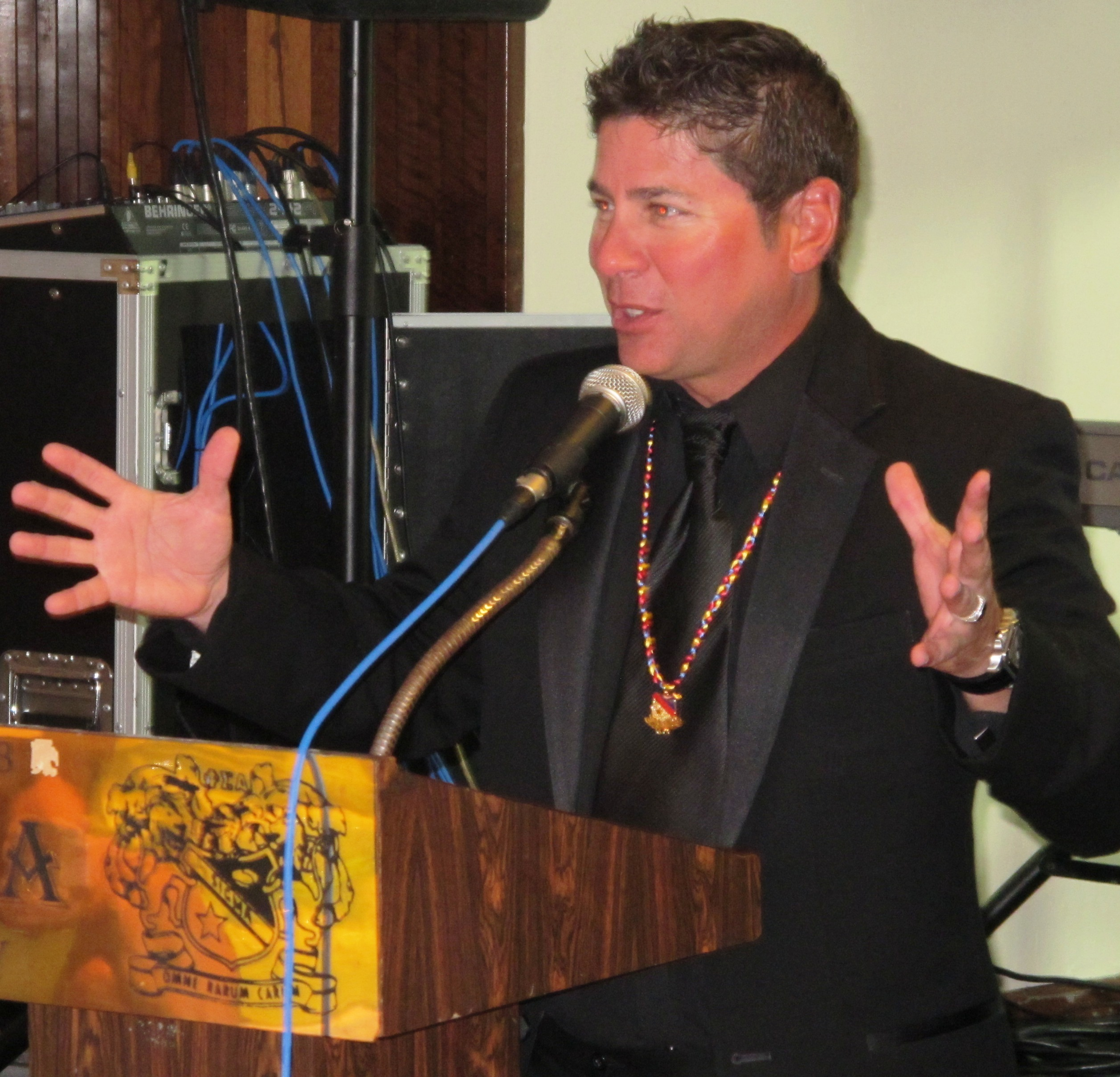
- Arrieta at the 2015 Phi Sigma Alpha Convention
- Born: Ramón Emilio Arrieta Vázquez; March 26, 1965 (age 61); Hato Rey, San Juan, Puerto Rico
- Occupations: Actor, comedian, musician and host

Ramón Emilio "Raymond" Arrieta Vázquez (born March 26, 1965), is a Puerto Rican actor, comedian, host and philanthropist. Starting his career as a comedian in various local shows, Arrieta gained popularity in the 1990s when he hosted a string of successful comedy shows where he showcased his various characters and personifications. Since 2007, Arrieta has been hosting the mid-day variety show Día a Día, along with Dagmar. Arrieta is also a radio show host and a theater actor.

Arrieta has gained prominence for his philanthropic endeavors. After his friend and co-host, Dagmar, was diagnosed with cancer in 2008, Arrieta has performed a yearly charity walk around various parts of the island while also raising awareness. Because of his commitment to the cause, Arrieta has received numerous recognitions, including from the Senate of Puerto Rico.

== Early years ==
Raymond Arrieta was born in Hato Rey, one of the main barrios of San Juan, Puerto Rico. His parents were Ramón Arrieta and Carmín Vázquez. Arrieta went to school at the Academia Nuestra Señora de la Providencia. When he was in the third grade, Arrieta volunteered to play the part of "Ramoneta Cienfuegos", a character of popular Puerto Rican comedian Shorty Castro, in a school play. After that he continued to participate in many other plays at school, even organizing his own. One of the works he wrote and directed was Mundo Loco, which told a story about a war between fans of Salsa music and fans of Rock music. Arrieta has mentioned that José Miguel Agrelot has always been his main inspiration.

After Arrieta graduated from high school, he enrolled in the Universidad del Sagrado Corazón of San Juan, where he earned a bachelor's degree in Radio and Television Production in 1987. There, he also joined Phi Sigma Alpha fraternity.

On one occasion, Arrieta and some friends visited the café theater "El Punto del Coquí" located in Old San Juan. He sat down and played the piano while doing imitations. The owner of the club was impressed and asked Arrieta to prepare an act for his club. Arrieta prepared an act called "Black and White" which was a success and he was soon traveling around the island with his "show". In 1983, Our Lady of the Providence Academy established the "Raymond Arrieta Award" which is annually awarded to the student with the best artistic qualities.

== Career as a comedian ==
In 1988, Arrieta already had his own radio show and was also participating in Telemundo's "Estudio Alegre" (Happy Studio);"El Show del Medio Día" (The Noon Show) for WAPA among others. He landed a role in the Spanish version of the play "The Diary of Anne Frank".

In 1991, Arrieta went to Mexico where he participated in the play "Mama ama el Rock" (Mother loves Rock) with Mexican stars Angelica María and Angélica Vale. In 1995, he replaced George Ortuzar as the host of Lente Loco (Crazy Lens), a Candid Camera-style show, co-hosting with Cuban model Odalys García.

In 1971, the Public Service Commission of Puerto Rico granted the first license to transmit through the cable format to Cable Television Corporation of Puerto Rico. The first attempt failed to become established and in 1977, the corporation was acquired by Cable TV of Greater San Juan. Other companies followed and around 200,000 clients held the basic programming by 1988. The local figures, feeling threatened by the new medium and assuming that cable programming was unavailable to the uneducated, decided to change its programming to include more sexual content and lowbrow comedies in order to comfort to stereotypes. Following the first attempt by Sunshine Logroño's Sunshine Café which received the support if advertisers shows like Raymond Arrieta's ¡Que Vacilón! and El show de Raymond followed the same pattern.

¡Qué Vacilón! aired in prime time through WAPA. In this comedy show of sketches and stand-ups, he brought to life, along with other local talents, which also included Rene Monclova, Jorge Castro, and Tita Guerrero, a bunch of peculiar characters who gained immense popularity in the Puerto Rican pop culture, like the clown Trompetilla, a grumpy clown with a kind of fraudulent circus; and Andresito a kind of Dennis the Menace little boy. Many consider this period to be the peak of his career. Towards the end of 1993, ¡Qué Vacilón! moved No te duermas to the second place in prime time ratings.

Arrieta had his own weekly TV show in Puerto Rico called "El Show de Raymond". Which was transmitted through Televicentro and WAPA TV. In 2007 he switched to Telemundo and WKAQ-TV, where he currently stars in his own daytime daily show, "Día a Día con Raymond y Dagmar". Puerto Rican comedian, José Miguel Agrelot once said, that Raymond Arrieta was the greatest comedian of the "new" generation. On February 3, 1997, he participated in Los 75 años de don Tommy, a special dedicated to Tommy Muñiz's career.

In 2014, Raymond returned to comedy television with the WKAQ-TV sketch comedy "Raymond y sus Amigos", which also reunites him with "Que Vacilon" cast members Monclova and Castro.

== Da Vida Caminando con Raymond (Walk-A-Thon) ==
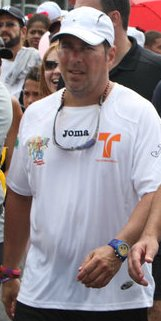

On Friday, May 15, 2009, Arrieta began a Walk-A-Thon to raise funds for cancer patients in Puerto Rican institutions, the city of Ponce to San Juan arriving in Telemundo Puerto Rico. The Walk-A-Thon which ended on May 19, 2009. This hike was named the 2nd Hike Ramón Rivero "Diplo," the first man to hold a walka-a-thon in the world to raise funds for a cause, in 1953—for the Oncological Hospital, in San Juan. On October 23, 2009 Fi Sigma Alfa honored Raymond Arrieta by bestowing upon him the "Medalla de Caballero Sigma" a medal only four other members have been honored with.

Arrieta walked again for cancer patients in 2010 from Aguadilla to San Juan arriving in Telemundo Puerto Rico with the name "Da Vida Caminando con Raymond". On June 4, 2010, on the very morning of the start of the Walk-A-Thon, Caguas mayor, William Miranda Marín died from pancreatic cancer. The 2010 edition of the Walk-A-Thon was dedicated to "Willie" first thing in the morning after in 2009 the Walk-A-Thon passed by through Caguas and he told Arrieta he would participate again the next year.

In 2011, Raymond walked for a third time from Vieques to San Juan in six days and raised money for the Puerto Rico Oncologist Hospital patients, which had no money to pay employees or. He walked 12 miles through the island of Vieques, then boarded a ferry back to Fajardo and continued to walk in a treadmill completing 2 miles in about an hour and a half. After reaching Fajardo everyone rested for the next day. In 3 days he reached San Juan, near the facilities of Telemundo. However, before arriving to San Juan, he followed the route which led to Caguas and he attended a memorial service held in honor of the memory of the late Caguas mayor William Miranda Marín, at the Caguas Botanical Garden, As stated before, Miranda Marín died on June 4, 2010, the first day of Arrieta's Walk-A-Thon from Mayagüez. The Walk-A-Thon continued to Río Piedras, then back to San Juan. The goal for this fund-raiser was $1 Million and, according to statistics, a record has been set with an unknown quantity of money at the moment. The route he completed was Vieques-Fajardo, Fajardo-Río Grande, Río Grande-San Juan, San Juan-Caguas, Caguas-Río Piedras and Río Piedras-San Juan.

== Characters ==
Character	Notes
Trompetilla	Clown
El Cascarazzi	Paparazzi
Florencio Melón Pujals	Charlie Too Much parody
Crispina	Cristina Saralegui parody
El Primo	Stand-Up Comedian
María Plinia Palerm Carbetó	aka. Plinia
Pedro Queselló	Pedro Rosselló parody
Wally	Walter Mercado parody
Chef Piñón	Chef Enrique Piñeiro parody
El Maricuazo	Jesús Omar Rivera "El Boricuazo" parody
Cayayo Culombo	State Policeman of Puerto Rico Character
Pirulo El Colorao	African "Bomba" Singer
John Tutty	John Toohey Morales parody
Don Raymisco	Don Francisco parody
El Indio Idelfonso	parody
Caco Tetilla	rapper
El Cabo	El General parody
Tito Sin Piedad	Tito Trinidad parody
Hector	Hector Travieso parody
Roggie	Rogelio Figueroa parody (radio only)
Marisol	Crazy Little Girl
Tuitusa	Statehood Supporter (Radio Only)
Carlos Pende Jimenez	Sex and the City parody
El Beberazi	Infant Reporter (Radio Only)
Dra. Apolo	Ana María Polo parody
Tato Collazo	Family man (Los Collazo)
Juan Armau	Juan Dalmau parody
Piru	Mail clerk
Lorenzano El Contable	Accountant

== Filmography ==
Year	Title	Role	Notes
1995–2001	Lente Loco	Host	TV show
1990–1992	Al Aire Libre	Host	TV show
1992–1995	Que Vacilón	Host	TV show
1996–1998	La Epidemia de la Risa	Host	TV show
1997	Quiero ser Estrella	Host	TV show
1998–2005	El Show de Raymond	Host	TV show
2004	El Sueño del Regreso	Flight attendant	Movie
2007–present	Día a Día con Raymond y Dagmar	Host	TV show
2014–present	Raymond y sus Amigos	Host	Sketch comedy and variety show

== See also ==
- List of Puerto Ricans
- List of television presenters/Puerto Rico

== Notes ==
Media offices
Preceded by George Ortuzar	Host of Lente Loco; 1995–2001	Succeeded by Defunct
