= Fernando Fiore =

Argentine television commentator

- Born: July 9, 1960 (age 66); Buenos Aires, Argentina
- Education: Montclair State University
- Occupations: Television personality Sportscaster; Actor
- Years active: 1988–present
- Notable work: Lente Loco; Fuera de Serie; República Deportiva

Fernando Fiore (born July 9, 1960) is an Argentine television personality known as the co-creator and original host of Lente Loco from 1992 to 1993, and the host of the travel show Fuera de Serie with Sofía Vergara. He is perhaps best known as the host of República Deportiva from its debut in 1999 until his departure in 2014. Fiore has anchored Univision's FIFA World Cup coverage from 1990 until 2014. Fiore, a two-time Emmy Award winner, is also the author of The World Cup: The Ultimate Guide to the Greatest Sports Spectacle in the World.

== Early life ==
Fiore was born in Buenos Aires, Argentina. At the age of 19, he moved to the United States to study at Montclair State University. He also studied theatre at TEATRO RODANTE PUERTORRIQUEÑO and acting school BELLAS ARTES, both in New York City. During this time, he also worked as a tour guide and graduated at TAYLOR BUSINESS INSTITUTE (Travel and Tourism) before returned to acting years later.

== Career ==
=== Early television career ===
In 1988, Fiore moved to Miami, Florida, where he worked in TELEMUNDO NETWORK as a reporter for the news magazine program “Día a Día”, Telemundo Deportes, show business show “Estrenos y Estrellas” and the game show “La Feria de la Alegría”. He moved to New York City the following year and started working as a news anchor for its local Univision station, including coverage of the FIFA World Cup in 1990. Fiore later moved back to Miami and did sports coverage for the Univision network. In 1992, he created and hosted the hidden-camera prank show Lente Loco. Cuban model Odalys Garcia joined the show as co-host later in its first season. By 1993, Fiore left Lente Loco to work on other projects at Univision and was replaced by George Ortuzar. From 1995 to 1998, Fiore hosted the travel series Fuera de Serie alongside Sofia Vergara.

=== Broadcasting career ===
Fiore was a long-time Univision personality, having formerly hosted its sports show Republica Deportiva. In 2016, Fiore joined Fox Sports, ]as panelist for Fox's English-language soccer coverage, including the CONCACAF Cup and Copa America Centenario.

During the 2018 FIFA World Cup in Russia, Fiore hosted FIFA World Cup Tonight along with Kate Abdo. In 2020 he created and hosted the sports/talk show “PALABRA DE PRESIDENTE” for TIGO SPORTS in Honduras and El Salvador. In 2022 traveled to Qatar as correspondent in English and Spanish for BEIN SPORTS for the FIFA WORLD CUP. He was also part of the original radio broadcast team in English of INTER MIAMI CF and since 2024 of the Spanish broadcast team in Spanish at DEPORTES RADIO 760 am.

Media offices
Preceded by None	Host of Lente Loco; 1992–1993	Succeeded by George Ortuzar
Preceded by None	Host of Republica Deportiva; 1999–2014	Succeeded by Julian Gil
