= Vicky & Johnny =

- Genre: Action; Comedy; Slapstick
- Created by: TUBA n Co., Ltd. Claudio Biern Llivirnia
- Developed by: Televisió de Catalunya
- Directed by: Sung jai Ahn; Tae Sik Shin
- Voices of: Marie Fagundo; Sly Johnson; Carlos Biern Enriquez; Jose Luis Ucha Llivirnia
- Composer: Claudio Biern Llivirnia
- Countries of origin: South Korea; Spain
- No. of seasons: 3
- No. of episodes: 104

Production
- Executive producer: Carlos Biern
- Producer: Claudio Biern Boyd
- Running time: 5 minutes
- Production companies: Tuba Entertainment; BRB Internacional; Screen 21; Televisió de Catalunya

Original release
- Network: AnimaKids

Vicky & Johnny (Korean: 비키와 조니) is a South Korean-Spanish series of animated shorts produced by Tuba Entertainment in South Korea and BRB Internacional, Screen 21 and Televisió de Catalunya in Spain. While the shorts are known as Vicky & Johnny in South Korea and parts of Asia, they are distributed in the rest of the world as Angus & Cheryl by BRB Internacional.

== Characters ==
- Vicky (Spanish: Cheryl)
  - Vicky is the heroine tomboy with a highly competitive and temperamental attitude. Johnny's pranks keep her from falling into monotony, and she is affectionate towards him because of his childish behavior. She considers herself Johnny's big sister. She never skips to punish Johnny when his affection is directed to other girls.
- Johnny (Spanish: Angus)
  - Johnny is Springtown's hero and the worst prankster they've ever known. His boundless ungrounded optimism is his vice and his virtue. He often ends up being the victim to his own plot to trick Vicky. he is always happy and joyful, but would not survive a day without Vicky.
- Mickey (Spanish: Buddy)
  - Mickey is healthy and good at all sports, but he is especially fond of baseball. He is Johnny's best friend. His friendship often pulls him into the pranks that Johnny pulls, and people think he's an innocent bystander.
- Rich (Spanish: Charles)
  - Rich is the only heir of a fallen nobility. He firmly believes he is in a higher class than everyone else. He causes an uproar if his clothes are stained, and loves to brag about himself. None of his friends believes him when he talks about his glorious heritage.
- Cory (Spanish: Francine)
  - Cory is a hip-hop girl with a love for music and dance. She is Vicky's best friend, always speaking for her and standing by her side. She is free and optimistic, and dreams to perform on a Hollywood stage. She is nice to the other girls, but hates the boy's childish pranks. She is in love with Uba, but it is unrequited.
- Suga (Spanish: Amanda)
  - Suga is naive and she is the pretty girl. She always believes she is the most gorgeous girl in spring town and believes that everyone adores her. She is friends with Vicky and Johnny, she loves make-up, and her dignity is fragile. Sugar is dating Mickey.
- Uba
  - Uba is a soccer lover and likes to keep things simple. He is newer in town, and a little uncomfortable around the other residents of Springtown. He is shy around girls, but does not return Cory's affection. He also does his best to keep out of Johnny's pranks.
- Luka
  - Luka loves to be a mime and expresses all thoughts and feelings without words. None of the characters use words, but Luka is especially silent. She will sometimes do magic and give her friends balloons. Her miming brings joy and despair to all those around her, as her friends just wish to know the true Luka behind the make-up.
- Roly-Poly (English: Mr. Beeg; Spanish: Sr. Egg)
  - Roly-Poly is the only adult in Springtown, and fits into any role that he is needed for. He is mysterious, and can appear in male and female roles in any situation where an adult may be needed.
- Rosemary
  - Rosemary is always smiling, but that often makes others think she's up to no good. Johnny and Vicky can't stand her pranks, and there is a wind up key/spring in her back with no other information. She gets into a lot more trouble than anyone can handle.
- Poco (Spanish: Keke)
  - Poco is Vicky's dog who always has a large smile on his face. Poco often does things that get Johnny in trouble, and is fiercely loyal to Vicky. Poco loves children, butterflies, and flowers.
