= Claudio Biern =

Spanish animator (1940–2022)

- Born: Claudio Biern Boyd; 21 November 1940; Palma, Majorca, Spain
- Died: 17 October 2022 (aged 81)
- Occupation: Animator

Claudio Biern Boyd (21 November 1940 – 17 October 2022) was a Spanish television writer, director, producer, and founder of the Spanish animation studio BRB Internacional. He created the television shows The World of David the Gnome and Gladiator Academy, among other projects.

== Life and career ==
Claudio was born in Palma in 1940 to a Catalan father and a Scottish mother (his maternal grandfather opened the Fabra y Coats factory in Spain). After studying Law at the University of Deusto in Bilbao, he joins the marketing team at Lever Ibérica in 1962, before joining the same team at other multinationals.

Throughout his professional career, Boyd received more than forty awards, among which are the Extraordinary Talent Award of the Academia de Televisión in 2017, Best Communicator with Children Award of the Festival Internacional de Comunicación Infantil El Chupete in 2014, Biznaga de Oro 2012 awarded by the Málaga Film Festival in 2012, Medalla al Trabajo President Macià Generalitat de Catalunya in 2011, the European Tribute of Honor award given by Cartoon Forum in 2007 or the Bronze Medal of the New York International Film and Television Festival for the series Dogtanian and the Three Muskehounds in 1982.

Boyd later chaired his companies, BRB Internacional and Apolo Films. He also ran as a candidate for the presidency of the football club RCD Espanyol, although he did not obtain the necessary votes to win.

He was also part of the directive of football team RCD Espanyol for three periods (1986–1989, 1993–1994 and 2004–2006).

Boyd died on 17 October 2022, at the age of 81.

== Filmography ==
TV shows

- A Thousand and One... Americas
- Around the World with Willy Fog
- Willy Fog 2
- Dogtanian and the Three Muskehounds
- The Return of Dogtanian
- The Mozart Band
- Football Stories
- Fantaghirò
- The Gnomes' Great Adventure
- The World of David the Gnome
- Wisdom of the Gnomes
- Ruy, the Little Cid
- Vicky & Johnny
- The Untouchables of Elliot Mouse
- Yolanda: The Secret of the Black Rose
- Gladiator Academy

Films

- The Monstrous Adventures of Zipi and Zape
- The Princess and the Pirate: Sandokan the TV Movie
- Fantaghiro: Quest for the Quorum
