= Cantinflas Show =

Mexican cartoon

- Title card
- Created by: Mario Moreno 'Cantinflas'
- Starring: Mario Moreno 'Cantinflas'
- Country of origin: Mexico
- Original language: Spanish
- No. of episodes: 53 (first season)

Production
- Executive producers: Mario Moreno; Jacques Gelman; Carlos Amador; Santiago Moro; José Luis Moro
- Running time: 5 min
- Production companies: Televisa; Veracruz Media

Original release
- Release: 1972 – 1982

Related
- Amigo and Friends

Cantinflas Show is a Mexican animated television series produced by Televisa, Dimex and Producciones Carlos Amador. The series was created by Mario Moreno 'Cantinflas' and animated by Spanish animator José Luis Moro, who animated the pilot episode in 1972.

Cantinflas, the main character, is present in popular stories like Samson and Delilah, and meets famous geniuses like Albert Einstein and Thomas Edison. It can clearly be seen that the Mexican comedian improvised his script, which adds the comedy relief, especially in his conversations with each episode's character.

The show was syndicated in the United States in two forms. The first, which aired as Amigo and Friends, dubbed the episodes in English. The second version used the original title, and distributed the episodes in both English and Spanish.

The show was dubbed into six languages, and was very successful in international distribution. The series Amigo and Friends and Cantinflashow are currently distributed by the worldwide copyright holder Veracruz Media LLC.

== Episodes ==
The following list contains the episodes from the first season of Cantinflas Show.

- 1.-Acapulco
- 2.-Adopte un Árbol (Adopt a Tree)
- 3.-El Astronauta
- 4.-La Aviación
- 5.-El Boxeo
- 6.-Caruso
- 7.-Chopín
- 8.-La Ciudad de México
- 9.-Cleopatra
- 10.-Un Cuento de Hadas (A Fairy Tale)
- 11.-Dante
- 12.-Diógenes
- 13.-Édison
- 14.-Einstein
- 15.-El Agua (The Water)
- 16.-El Diluvio (Noah's Ark)
- 17.-El Petróleo (The Oil)
- 18.-El Rey Midas
- 19.-En el Japón (In Japan)
- 20.-Fausto
- 21.-Federico el Grande
- 22.-Francis Drake
- 23.-El Fútbol
- 24.-Galileo
- 25.-Goya
- 26.-Gulliver
- 27.-Gutenberg
- 28.-Hans Christian Andersen
- 29.-Helena de Troya
- 30.-La Comunicación
- 31.-La Carta (The Letter) - Featuring excerpts from El Salón México by Aaron Copland
- 32.-La Electricidad
- 33.-La Imagen
- 34.-La Roma de Nerón (Nero's Rome)
- 35.-La Vivienda (Housing)
- 36.-Las 7 Maravillas (Teotihuacán)
- 37.-Las Musas (The Muses)
- 38.-Leonardo da Vinci
- 39.-Linneo y Darwin
- 40.-Madrid
- 41.-Marco Polo
- 42.-El Museo Antropológico (The Anthropology Museum)
- 43.-Napoleón
- 44.-La Navidad (Christmas)
- 45.-Lo Oriental
- 46.-Pasteur
- 47.-Robinsón Crusoe
- 48.-Romeo y Julieta
- 49.-Sansón
- 50.-Superagente 777
- 51.-Los Toros (Bullfighting)
- 52.-Velázquez

== Remake ==
In 1982, Hanna-Barbera produced a new version of the cartoon series, Cantinflas y Sus Amigos, titled in English-speaking countries as Amigo and Friends. Cantinflas himself reprised his role in Spanish, while Don Messick voiced the character in English, with Cantinflas' character renamed as "Amigo".

== DVD release ==
In 2004, BCI, under a license from Rebel Crew Films Inc, released the shorts on DVD under the Cantinflas Show name; the DVD collection also included episodes of Amigo and Friends. Veracruz Media LLC retains all worldwide distribution rights for the Cantinflas Show and Amigo and Friends.
