= A Thousand and One... Americas =

- Created by: Claudio Biern Boyd
- Country of origin: Spain
- No. of seasons: 1
- No. of episodes: 26

Production
- Running time: 23 minutes (approx.)
- Production companies: BRB Internacional; Televisión Española

Original release
- Network: TVE1
- Release: 1989

A Thousand and One... Americas (Spanish: Las mil y una... Americas) is a Spanish animated television series produced by BRB Internacional and Televisión Española to celebrate the 5th centenary of Christopher Columbus' voyage to America.

== Plot ==
The series focuses on the adventures of Chris (named so as a tribute to Christopher Columbus who discovered America. Like Columbus, Chris also discovers it in his imagination), a 10-year-old boy, and his yellowish dog Lon. Chris accidentally discovers an old book at the attic which belonged to his grandfather, which he brought with him from his journeys. The book makes him and his dog time travel through imagination to historical occurrences of different nations which lived in the Americas before their discovery by Columbus in 1492.

== Dubbing ==
The series has been dubbed and subtitled in English, Spanish, Serbian, Macedonian, Greek (dubbed only) and Hebrew.

== Music ==
The opening and ending songs of the Spanish version were performed by the famous group Mocedades, which reached 2nd place in the 1973 Eurovision Song Contest.

== Regional releases ==
No DVD or VHS release has ever been made of the series, although the complete show is available (in Spanish) in BRB's YouTube channel.

== Structure ==
Each new adventure would begin with a more or less rhetorical question by Chris' brother. Chris, excited, would take his brother to the attic to search for the answer in their grandfather's book. A voice over would follow by Chris' grandfather describing the flora and fauna of the place the pre-Columbian culture inhabited, while on screen the mentioned beings were shown.

Before actually beginning the adventure, there would be a comical sequence of a predator trying to catch a prey, without success. Chris would arrive into a village of the culture, where after having to save someone's life, giving the excuse to have the characters present each other, some odd comment would be made about his dog. The oddest of which came from cultures that never knew of dogs.

Adventures would usually span several episodes, before starting a new one with a different culture.

== Alternative titles ==
- Las mil y una... Americas (Spanish)
- A Thousand and One... Americas (English)
- As mil e uma Américas (Portuguese)
- אלף ואחת אמריקות (Elef VeAchat Amerikot) (Israeli)
- Com'è grande l'America (Italian)
- Hiljadu i jedna Amerika (Serbian)
- Χίλιες και μία Αμερικές (Greek)
- 1001 amerikai (Hungarian)
- Илјада и една Америка (Macedonian)
- 克里斯梦游美洲 (Chinese)
