= Carlos Porrata =

Puerto Rican television personality (c.1946–2019)

Carlos Porrata Doria (c. 1946 - August 19, 2019) was a Puerto Rican television gossiper and personality. He was better known as Charlie Too Much.

== Religious views and sexuality ==
After identifying as homosexual for decades, Porrata Doria revealed, during 2014, he had become a newborn Christian.

== Illness and death ==
His lawyer and friend, Emilio Cancio, reported to the press that Charlie was admitted to the emergency room due to breathing problems caused by pulmonary deficiency, and his health condition worsened as the days went by. He also had kidney problems. After 15 days of being admitted to Pavía Hospital in Santurce, Puerto Rico, Porrata Doria died on August 19, 2019. He had been diagnosed with HIV in the early 2010's, and overcame the disease with treatment. "He struggled and took great care of himself, to the point that he came out negative (in HIV tests),” Cancio shared.

The last 15 to 16 years he lived in Puerto Nuevo, Puerto Rico with "Doña Dominga", a woman who welcomed him into her home and did not let him move until he died. “She was like a mother to him,” Emilio Cancio also said.
