= Lente Loco =

Television series

- Genre: Comedy
- Created by: Carlos Marquez-Sterling; Manuel Elgarresta
- Developed by: Carlos Marquez-Sterling
- Written by: Carlos Marquez-Sterling; Manuel Elgarresta; Fernando Fiore
- Directed by: Bert Delgado; Papo Jolguera
- Presented by: Fernando Fiore (1992–1993); Odalys Garcia (1993–2001); George Ortuzar (1993–1995); Raymond Arrieta (1995–2001)
- Narrated by: Luis Chao (1998–2001)
- Theme music composer: Carlos Marmo
- Country of origin: United States
- Original language: Spanish

Production
- Executive producer: Jo-Ann Rullan
- Producers: Carlos Marquez-Sterling; Manuel Elgarresta
- Production locations: Miami, FL
- Editors: Maria Booker; Emilio Pimentel

Original release
- Network: Univision
- Release: 1992 – 2001

Lente Loco (English translation: "Crazy Lens") is a hidden camera-comedy television show that aired on Univision from 1992 to 2001. Similar to the long-running Candid Camera, the show involved concealing cameras filming ordinary people being confronted with unusual situations. Carlos Marquez-Sterling was creator along with Manuel Elgarresta and Fernando Fiore, the original host of Lente Loco beginning in 1992. Model Odalys Garcia joined the show midway through its first season, remaining on the show for the rest of its run. George Ortuzar replaced Fiore as host in 1993. Ortuzar left in 1995 and was replaced by Raymond Arrieta for the remainder of its run.

== Sponsorship ==
Kellogg's was a main sponsor of the show throughout most of its run until the show’s final season, with their breakfast cereals (most frequently either Corn Pops, Froot Loops or Frosted Flakes) advertised during the show (often consisting with one of the hosts eating the advertised cereal) as well as that episode’s advertised cereal sponsoring select segments.

Other sponsors of the show have included Blockbuster Video, Budweiser, Chevrolet, Colgate, Ford, Miller, Pepsi and Post.
