= El Boricuazo =

Puerto Rican educator

- Born: Jesús Omar Rivera Dávila; January 16, 1962 (age 64); San Juan, Puerto Rico
- Occupations: Writer, public speaker, tourist guide
- Known for: Knowledge of Puerto Rico
- Parents: Aníbal Rivera (father); Blanca Dávila Rodríguez (mother)
- Website: www.boricuazopr.com

Jesús Omar Rivera Dávila (born January 16, 1962), better known as El Boricuazo, is a Puerto Rican media personality, writer, tour guide, college instructor, and public speaker from Bayamón. Rivera is known for his appearances on Puerto Rican television and radio, where he offers stories, facts, and trivia about Puerto Rico that are not well known to the general public.

== Early life ==
Jesús Omar Rivera Dávila was born in 1962, in San Juan, Puerto Rico to Aníbal Rivera and Blanca Dávila Rodríguez. Rivera has two brothers and a sister: José Aníbal, Néstor, and Blanquita, who were raised together in Bayamón. At a young age, Rivera started collecting information and facts that were curious, interesting, and less known to Puerto Ricans. He created his own tables and statistics. He would later graduate from the University of Puerto Rico, majoring in psychology and tourism.

== Career ==
At the age of 21, Rivera became a tour guide. Upon turning 23, he became the Academic Director of the Department of Tourism and Air Lines of the Benedict School in San Juan. After this, Rivera directed and coordinated the programs of Tourism and Air Lines on the campuses of Bayamón and Emory College, Caguas. He further directed the Program of Tourist Guides and Operators of Excursions at the National Center of Touristic Studies in Hato Rey.

Rivera gives talks, training, seminars, courses, and conferences in Puerto Rico, the United States, Hispanic America, and Spain. He has appeared and participated in national TV programs including news and interview or talk shows on stations such as WKAQ-TV, WAPA-TV, WIPR-TV, WLII-TV, and WPRM-FM. (Note: Vargas Casiano (2012; in Spanish) "El grupo [que compone El Circo de La Mega] lo completa Fernan Vélez, Pamela Noa, Che Morales, El Boricuazo, Jay Fonseca, Hambo y Wilfred Morales.") He used to have a weekly appearance on Univisión Puerto Rico.

His first book, titled Boricuazo, Tu Orgullo Nacional, was self-published in early 2008 as a collection of facts about the impact of Puerto Rico and its people on the world. (Note: " La segunda edición del libro de El Boricuazo ocupa la primera posición en las tiendas Borders desde que salió hace dos semanas, según indicó el gerente de las tiendas en Puerto Rico, Julio Reyes.")

== See also ==
- List of Puerto Ricans
