= Pepe Plata =

Spanish-language sitcom

Pepe Plata is a 1990 Spanish-language sitcom produced by DIC Entertainment and aired on Univision with 65 episodes.

== Episodes ==
1. Recuerdos de Alfonso
2. Tortilla Mistica
3. Rock & Roll Pepe
4. Vamos a Bailar
5. El Dinosaurio de Pepe
