= Flight Squad =

- Also known as: Air Academy
- Genre: Animated series
- Created by: Olivier Marvaud; David Faure
- Directed by: Benoit di Sabatino
- Voices of: See below
- Countries of origin: Canada; France
- Original languages: French; English
- No. of episodes: 26

Production
- Executive producers: Micheline Charest; Ronald A. Weinberg; Christophe di Sabatino; Eric Garnet; Paul Hannequart; Marc Minjauw
- Producer: Cassandra Schafhausen
- Running time: 24 minutes
- Production companies: CINAR Corporation; Antéfilms Productions; Neurones Animation

Original release
- Network: M6 (France); Teletoon (Canada)
- Release: March 6 – July 2, 2000

Flight Squad (Air Academy in French) is an animated television series produced by the CINAR Corporation (now WildBrain), Antéfilms Productions, and Neurones Animation. 26 episodes of the show were produced.

== Plot ==
A team of daredevil pilots form the Flight Squad. With their own airplane fleet that is as high-yielding as it is varied, Flight Squad is organized as an independent air services company, carrying out "à la carte" missions for their clients.

== Characters ==
- Dan, an ex-fighter pilot and former member of the Canadian secret service.
- Tina, an assistant woman.
- Alex
- Jeff, elder brother of Emma.
- Emma, little sister of Jeff
- Jeff's teenage friends.
- Max, indispensable.
- Parachute the Flying Squirrel, the team's pet.

== Enemies ==
- Kordac, benefactor of Barracudas.
- Bill, leader of Barracudas.
- Buck, Bill's second in command and member of Barracudas.
- Boris, member of Barracudas and the more baddest of them.

== Voice cast ==
- Al Goulem
- Ricky Mabe
- Thor Bishopric
- A.J. Henderson
- Patricia Rodriguez
- Richard Dumont
- Holly Gauthier-Frankel
- Mark Camacho
- Arthur Holden

== Episodes ==
No. overall	No. in season	Teletoon/Télétoon title	Teletoon airdate	Télétoon airdate
1	1	"One of Our Satellites Is Missing" "Opération satellite"	Unaired	June 4, 2000
2	2	"Cream of the Crop" "La crème des récoltes"	March 27, 2000	June 10, 2000
3	3	"The Secret of the Icon" "L'icône mystérieuse"	April 17, 2000	June 11, 2000
4	4	"Sky Jack" "Hold-up en plein ciel"	July 2, 2000	April 29, 2000
5	5	"Whale Rescue" "S.O.S. Baleines"	April 24, 2000	April 30, 2000
6	6	"Leonardo De Alex" "Alex De Vinci"	Unaired	June 17, 2000
7	7	"Log Booming" "Les voleurs de bois"	Unaired	June 18, 2000
8	8	"Ghost Plane" "L'avion fantôme"	Unaired	June 24, 2000
9	9	"Flying Ark" "L'arche volante"	Unaired	June 25, 2000
10	10	"Christmas Star" "L'étoile de Noël"	Unaired	July 1, 2000
11	11	"The White She-Wolf" "La louve blanche"	May 8, 2000	May 7, 2000
12	12	"Parachute to the Rescue" "La chasse aux castors"	Unaired	July 2, 2000
13	13	"The Black Lagoon" "Le lagon noir"	May 15, 2000	May 13, 2000
14	14	"The Return of the Pilot" "Le retour du pilote"	May 22, 2000	May 14, 2000
15	15	"Underground Fire" "Le feu sous la terre"	May 29, 2000	May 20, 2000
16	16	"Cloud Wraith" "Le spectre des nuages"	Unaired	May 21, 2000
17	17	"Top Gal" "La justicière du ciel"	Unaired	May 27, 2000
18	18	"Terror Train" "Aller simple"	Unaired	May 28, 2000
19	19	"Pirates of the Frozen Sea" "Les pirates de la mer glacée"	Unaired	June 3, 2000
20	20	"Skynapped" "Le sequestre la mine"	March 6, 2000	April 5, 2000
21	21	"Bigfoot" "Le Bigfoot"	March 13, 2000	April 9, 2000
22	22	"Trial by Fire" "Le baptême du feu"	March 20, 2000	April 15, 2000
23	23	"Compact Risk" "Compact risque"	April 3, 2000	April 22, 2000
24	24	"Double Trouble" "Double danger"	April 10, 2000	April 23, 2000
25	25	"Uranium Express" "Uranium express"	May 1, 2000	May 6, 2000
26	26	"Ice!" "Multiples facettes"	August 13, 2000	April 16, 2000

== Broadcast ==
The show ran on Teletoon in Canada. Internationally, The show is aired on M6 in France and Telefutura (Spanish) and This TV in the United States.

== DVD releases ==
Two volumes of the series, each containing three episodes, were released on DVD in 2005.
