= Fantaghirò (TV series) =

1999 Spanish-Italian TV series

- Czech DVD cover of the animated film.
- Created by: Claudio Biern Boyd
- Countries of origin: Spain; Italy
- No. of episodes: 26

Production
- Running time: 28 minutes (approx.)
- Production companies: Reti Televisive Italiane; Gestevisión Telecinco; BRB Internacional; Grupo Planeta; Colorland Animation Production

Original release
- Network: Italia 1 and Boing (Italy); Telecinco (Spain)
- Release: 1999 – 2000

Fantaghirò is a 1999 Spanish-Italian fantasy animated television series loosely based on the Italian live-action film series Fantaghirò. It was created by BRB Internacional with animation by Colorland Animation Production, written by Francesca Melandri, Giovanni Romoli and Lamberto Bava, produced by Mediaset, Telecinco and Grupo Planeta, with music by Mark Bradley and Terry Wilson. A 75-minute animated film Fantaghirò: Quest for the Kuorum edited together using footage from the series was released in 2000.

== Plot ==
The series uses elements from all five of the live-action Fantaghirò films, combining and rearranging various events and characters appearances. The main theme throughout the series is the love between Princess Fantaghirò and King Romualdo, which changes and affects everyone around them. The main villains throughout the series are the Black Witch and her master, the lord of evil Darken, both of whom appear from the very first episode. Various places and people that were not named in the films have been given names in the cartoon adaptation, such as the kingdoms of Tuan and Dana, which are Fantaghirò and Romualdo's respective home kingdoms.

The series revolves around the adventures of Fantaghirò, the youngest daughter of King Hadrian of the kingdom of Tuan. She is brave and outspoken, and refuses to be demure and obedient like all women are supposed to be. Initially unknown to her, Fantaghirò was born with a very specific destiny, which is to conquer all the evil in the land. Her passion comes from her great love for Romualdo, the prince of the kingdom of Dana. Throughout the series the Black Witch and Darken attempt to separate or destroy both Fantaghirò and Romualdo.

== Characters ==
Many of the characters from the live-action films are in this animated series, but some have been renamed or changed. There also a number of new characters added. Among the film characters that have been brought over to the series are Fantaghirò, Romualdo, Fantaghirò's father, Catherine, Caroline, Cataldo, Ivaldo, the Black Witch, Darken, Tarabas, Xelesia, and Golden Mane, but the character of Tarabas, who was a prominent character in the third and fourth films, is only a minor character in this series. Characters that have been changed are Lightning and Bolt from the films, who have become an imp-boy named Flash and a cat named Bolt, and the White Witch who has been split into two characters named the White Fairy and Mother Goose.

== Episodes ==
1. "The Prophecy": The introduction of the kingdoms of Tuan and Dana, which have been fighting for centuries ever since Princess Kyra of Tuan made a pact with the dark lord Darken to steal the holy Kuorum, which is linked to the emotions of the two kingdoms. As long as the two kingdoms fight, the Kuorum is a source of dark magic. Many years later a prophecy comes to be that a girl will be born who will bring the peace and destroy all evil in the world. Meanwhile, the evil Black Witch plots for this fate not to happen and to rule over the both kingdoms. She sets out to kill Fantaghirò, who has just been born to King Hadrian of Tuan, but the White Fairy sets out to protect the baby princess.
2. "The Grotto of the Holy Beast": Fantaghirò has grown up into a young woman, and has been having dreams about a young man with enchanting eyes. She feels that she has to find that young man, but her father King Hadrian has summoned a trio of princes from another kingdom to marry her and her elder sisters Catherine and Caroline. Fantaghirò rejects the proposal and flees to the forest, where she meets the White Fairy who tells her of her destiny, and later encounters her enemy Prince Romualdo from the kingdom of Dana.
3. "The Scarlet Knight": Prince Romualdo dreams that he is fighting the dark lord Darken, and he is helped by a mysterious Scarlet Knight. Romualdo sends a message to the king of Tuan asking for a final duel to end the war between their two kingdoms. King Hadrian agrees and holds a tournament to decide which Tuan warrior will represent the kingdom in the duel. Fantaghirò secretly enters the tournament as the Scarlet Knight thanks to her friend Mother Goose. When the Black Witch learns of this tournament, she sends her own minion, the Black Knight, to defeat the Scarlet Knight.
4. "The Duel of Love": Fantaghirò is preparing for her duel to the death with Romualdo, unaware that he is the one with whom she is in love. The Black Witch, fearing that Fantaghirò and Romualdo will discover their true identities and that love will join them together forever, wants to make sure they will never realize that they are destined for each other. Her spell creates a double of Fantaghirò who then lures Romualdo to the Bottomless Swamp to die there. The White Fairy warns Romualdo of the danger waiting for him when, in the duel, he faces the Scarlet Knight, whose identity he does not know. The White Fairy fights back against the Black Witch with her own plot to protect the would-be lovers.
5. "The Hunter's Prey": King Hadrian is traveling away from his kingdom when he is hunted down by Darken and his minions, the Drakes. Elsewhere, Catherine and Caroline are preparing to marry their beaus Cataldo and Ivaldo, respectively. At this event, Fantaghirò makes a magical vow never to fight with weapons ever again. The celebrations are cut short when news arrives that King Hadrian has been captured by the Black Witch, so Romualdo, Cataldo, Ivaldo and the army leave to save the king. Fantaghirò secretly goes after that and battles her own way to the Dark Castle.
6. "The Rescue of the Kuorum": Fantaghirò arrives at the Dark Castle. Inside, she has to battle many creatures and avoid many traps, but is shocked when she finally reaches the Kuorum and discovers that she has to fight her beloved Romualdo, who has been put under a spell by the Black Witch.
7. "The Forest of the Elves": As Fantaghirò and Romualdo are traveling to the kingdom of Torelia, they are attacked by Darken and the Black Witch again, and this time they are separated in the Forest of the Elves. Fantaghirò meets a Unicorn and has to face three trials set by the Elves.
8. "Heart of Stone": Xelesia, mother of the dark wizard Tarabas, discovers a prophecy that he will be defeated by Fantaghirò. Xelesia sends her clay warriors to fight Fantaghirò, and during the battle one of the clay warriors drags Romualdo into the river, where he is turned into a stone statue. Fantaghirò then discovers that the only way to save her beloved is to get a kiss from Tarabas himself.
9. "The Black Cloud": While Fantaghirò stays in the Forest of Oread and while Romualdo, Ivaldo and Cataldo are in the kingdom of Dana, the Black Witch conjures the terrible Black Cloud and sends it to the kingdom of Tuan, where it swallows Fantaghirò's castle completely. Fantaghirò teams up with the Dragon and the White Fairy to prevent the Black Cloud from reaching Dana and redirect it towards the Mountains of the Eternal Eclipse, the only place where it can be defeated. Meanwhile, concerned about the fate of Fantaghirò and the inhabitants of Tuan, Romualdo, Cataldo and Ivaldo try to reach this kingdom.
10. "Captain Redface": The Black Witch has sent an enchanted balloon to destroy Fantaghirò's castle. Fantaghirò, Romualdo and King Hadrian are able to stop it from destroying the walls, but they are caught in it and are spirited away from the kingdom toward an unknown destination. Fantaghirò follows them by riding on Golden Mane, but eventually the balloon flies over the sea. Fantaghirò manages to get passage on a mysterious ship, but it turns out to be much more complicated than it seems.
11. "The Horseman of Hate": Darken and the Black Witch find a way bring back the hatred between the kingdoms of Tuan and Dana to make fight again, this time using General Orymus of Dana, who believes that Romualdo is neglecting his own people. The Horseman of Hate arrives and affects everyone except Fantaghirò and Romualdo, who are left alone to save their people for being consumed by hate.
12. "The Underground War"
13. "Pirate Noname"
14. "The Genie of Evil"
15. "The Last Goodbye": Raken, the most powerful wizard ever to live, sends the Horseman of the Plague to crush Fantaghirò's kingdom with his power, sending all the inhabitants into an eternal sleep. Only Fantaghirò stays awake, watching in desperation how Romualdo is kidnapped. Fantaghirò joins forces with the witch Xelexia's son Tarabas, a young wizard who has fallen in love with her and an old acquaintance of hers, and they go to Raken's underground kingdom.
16. "In the Mouth of Evil"
17. "The Cemetery of Dragons"
18. "In the Heart of the Ice": High up on Ice Mountain rises an impressive palace made from icicles. Inside the palace, trapped in a frozen pool and guarded by the evil Ice Man, grow some beautiful water lilies, the symbol of eternal love. Fantaghirò knows about the story from her father, King Hadrian, who had always wanted but was never able to give one of those beautiful flowers to the late Queen Alba. Fantaghirò's love for her father and the yearning for her mother, lead her to depart, accompanied by Romualdo and Mother Goose, in search of the mysterious water lilies.
19. "The Book of a Thousand Spells": Fantaghirò, accompanied by Romualdo, goes to fight a dangerous forest monster that was frightening her subjects and discovers that it is a mechanical vehicle. Inside it is Ali, a magician who has a black cat. Ali tells them he is fleeing from the Black Witch and from Isuf, the Wizard of Damascus, who want him to reveal the place in which the Book of a Thousand Spells is hidden. The black cat is actually Scheherazade, the storyteller who has been enchanted by Isuf for having refused to tell him where the book is hidden.
20. "The Weapons of Peace"
21. "The Magic Garden"
22. "Tree World": Tree World, a gigantic place inhabited by peaceful human-sized insects, comes under attack by the Black Witch who seeks the legendary stones that in former times were what gave dragons their strength and that will make whoever possesses them the most powerful being in the world. In the midst of the general mayhem, Vinson the cicada remembers the old song that tells about the princess of Tuan being one who speaks with dragons and who will save Tree World. Arigato the ant departs in search of Fantaghiró.
23. "The Essence of Life"
24. "The Dark Elf"
25. "The Red Diamond": Everyone in Tuan is excited about the wedding of Fantaghirò and Romualdo that is about to be held. Hadrian gives Fantaghirò his most treasured jewel, the Red Diamond, and tells her about the amazing and mysterious way in which it reached him. Fantaghirò is spellbound by the jewel's beauty and senses that it conceals many secrets. That same night, the Red Diamond radiate its powers and the witch Dahak awakens in her lair with evil joy. For centuries, she has unsuccessfully tried to take possession of the Red Diamond and this time she is unwilling to fail. Dahak departs for Fantaghirò's Castle to threaten the princess if she does not hand over the diamond.
26. "Love Conquers Everything": Darken contrives his most terrible plan to destroy Fantaghirò once and for all. He sets a trap to draw the princess to his own kingdom, Volcano, accompanied by the White Fairy. This way the fairy will not pose an obstacle for the Black Witch and will leave the Forest of Oread unprotected, ready to be invaded by Darken. Unaware of the danger they are about to face, a few days before their marriage, Fantaghirò and Romualdo receive a visit from the White Fairy who explains to them that she has felt the presence of the Aurum and that they must hurry and find it. Remembering her past, she tells them it was a powerful books of spells with which her former teacher had become so mighty and evil that he turned into Darken. The final battle between good and evil has begun.
