= Gladiator Academy =

Spanish children's animated television series

- Genre: Children's; Animated
- Created by: Claudio Biern Boyd
- Composers: Terry Wilson; Mark Bradley
- Country of origin: Spain
- Original language: Spanish
- No. of series: 1
- No. of episodes: 26 (+1 special)

Production
- Executive producer: Claudio Biern Boyd
- Running time: 24 minutes

Original release
- Network: Telecinco
- Release: 2002 – 2003

Gladiator Academy (Spanish: Academia de Gladiadores) is a children's animated television series created by Claudio Biern Boyd, who also created The World of David the Gnome. The series was targeted to children aged 6 to 10 and premiered on Telecinco in 2002. It was a co-production between Telecinco and Boyd's company BRB Internacional.

The show was made available on Mediaset Spain's MiteleKids website in 2013. In North America, Gladiator Academy was added to the Toon Goggles on-demand service for children. Internationally, the series was picked up by MVS Comunicaciones in Latin America, Mediatrade in Italy, NOGA in Israel, and Turkish Media Corporation in Turkey.

== Plot ==
A group of four young gladiators live on the Mediterranean island of Cornucopia during the height of the Roman Empire. They work in the island's Colosseum and protect the island from various villains.

== Characters ==
- Fracas (Carlos Pascual (Spanish): The gladiator group's athletic and handsome leader, he is vain and obsessed with his appearance.
- Arena (Cristina Figueras (Spanish): A strong and agile female gladiator with red hair, she is intelligent but rather reckless.
- Rumpus (Carlos Pascual (Spanish): A very kind and large gladiator with the strength to lift rocks with just one hand, but he is not very quick-witted.
- Hocus (Oriol Roca (Spanish): The group's shortest member with a knack for coming up with good ideas and is very logical.
- Sinus (Cristina Figueras (Spanish): An eight-year-old boy who governs Cornucopia, he is very responsible for his age.

== Episodes ==
1. "The Art of Deception"
2. "Sporadicus"
3. "The Blooms of Doom"
4. "The Littlest Gladiator"
5. "Babies in Gladiatorland"
6. "The Unhappy Birthday Present"
7. "The Revenge of the Gladiator Girls"
8. "Cornucopia Beach Resort"
9. "Hydra Go Seek"
10. "The Host"
11. "Honeymoon on Sight"
12. "The Unicorn Conspiracy"
13. "No Roman Is an Island"
14. "The End of the Game"
15. "The Dregs from Rome"
16. "An Eye for an Eye"
17. "Heavenly Spoiled Brats"
18. "Sea No Evil, Head No Evil"
19. "The Cyclops Who Would Be Queen"
20. "The Longest Battle"
21. "Brute Is Beautiful"
22. "Experience Teaches (Live and Learn)"
23. "The Best Lion of the Empire"
24. "Magnusson's Little Helpers"
25. "Ave Sinus Caesar"
26. "Something Wacky This Way Comes"
27. Gladiator Academy: The TV Movie
