= George Ortuzar =

Cuban American actor/comic/TV host (born 1961)

- Born: George Ortuzar; August 14, 1961 (age 64)
- Other names: George O; Giorgio
- Education: University of Miami
- Occupations: Television personality; actor; comedian; sportscaster
- Years active: 1989–present
- Notable work: Lente Loco; La Piñata Loca; Giorgiomania
- Partner: Lily Marian (2001–present)
- Children: 5
- Website: betwithgeorgeo.com

George Ortuzar (born August 14, 1961), also known as George O, is a Cuban American actor, comedian, television host and sports agent, who is best known for his work on Univision, including hosting the shows Lente Loco, La Piñata Loca, and Giorgiomania. Ortuzar has also appeared in several films and commercials, and was featured in advertisements promoting the Hollywood Park Racetrack, for which he served as the marketing manager during its last 12 years of operation. Since 2015, he has hosted the online sports show Better Sports News on YouTube.

== Career ==
=== Television ===
Ortuzar's career on television began in 1991, when he joined Univision after being discovered by production executives. After numerous appearances on Sabado Gigante, he went on to become the host of Lente Loco in 1993, alongside Odalys Garcia. Years later, he starred in two children shows La Piñata Loca and Giorgiomania, and has been featured in numerous commercials and infomercials over the years. Ortuzar was also a contestant on the game show The Moment of Truth in 2008. On February 14, 2015, Ortuzar began hosting the YouTube sports news series Better Sports News alongside sportscaster Jeff Chapman.

=== Other work ===
Ortuzar was the spokesperson and marketing manager for the Hollywood Park Racetrack from 2001 until its closure in 2013. As of 2014, Ortuzar works as a jockey agent for the Los Alamitos Race Course. In 2015 George was hired by C.A.R.F (California association of racing fairs) to be their track announcer/morning line maker.

== Personal life ==
Ortuzar has been dating his longtime girlfriend Lily Marian since 2001. He has three children from a previous marriage, Alex his eldest and twins Georgie and Natalie Ortuzar. He has two granddaughters, Sofia and Marilyn. George has two step-children that he has raised with his girlfriend Lily Marian.

In his appearance on the second episode of The Moment of Truth, after truthfully answering no to the question of whether or not he'd ever gambled away one of his children's college funds (his son, who was present, had previously been told by Ortuzar's ex-wife that he had gambled his college fund away), Ortuzar declared that he felt that he "was a winner" even if he left with nothing. He ended up leaving with $100,000.

== Filmography ==
=== Film ===
- Summer Job (1989)
- Otto: The Alien from East Frisia (1989)
- Popcorn (1991)
- Chains of Gold (1991)
- Folks! (1992)
- Triumph Over Disaster: The Hurricane Andrew Story (1993)
- Station 4 (2011, 2014)
- Family Physician (2012)
- Muy Macho (2012)

=== Television ===
- Lente Loco (1993–1996)
- Extralarge (1993)
- Premio Lo Nuestro (1995)
- La Piñata Loca (1996–1999)
- Giorgiomania (1997–1999)
- The Moment of Truth (2008)
- Medium Rare (2010)

Media offices
Preceded by Fernando Fiore	Host of Lente Loco; 1993–1995	Succeeded by Raymond Arrieta
