= Bruno the Kid =

1990s American animated series

- Genre: Animation; Action; Adventure; Comedy; Mystery
- Created by: Joel Madison
- Developed by: Lane Raichert; Bruce Willis; Joel Madison; Phil Roman
- Written by: David Garber
- Voices of: Bruce Willis; Jennifer Hale; Tony Jay; Mark Hamill
- Theme music composer: Nathan Wang (credited as "Bruno and the Acceleraptors")
- Opening theme: "When You Got A Problem, Call Bruno the Kid"
- Ending theme: "When You Got A Problem, Call Bruno the Kid" (instrumental)
- Composer: Nathan Wang
- Countries of origin: United States; United Kingdom; Germany
- Original language: English
- No. of seasons: 1
- No. of episodes: 36

Production
- Executive producers: Bill Schultz; Lolee Aries; Phil Roman; Bruce Willis; For Nickelodeon U.K.; Howard Litton
- Editor: Allan R. Potter
- Running time: 22 minutes
- Production companies: Film Roman; Active Entertainment; Flying Heart Films; Taurus Film GmbH and Co.

Original release
- Network: Syndication (BKN) (United States); Nickelodeon (United Kingdom)
- Release: September 23, 1996 – May 26, 1997

Bruno the Kid is a syndicated animated series created by Joel Madison and produced by Film Roman In association with Flying Heart Films, Taurus Film GmbH and Co. and Nickelodeon UK. The series consists of 36 half-hour episodes, and ran from September 23, 1996, to May 26, 1997. Spanish-dubbed episodes of the series aired on Univision in the United States from September 16, 2000, to September 8, 2001, as part of the ¡De Cabeza! Saturday Morning Block. It also has Spanish-dubbed episodes of the series aired on Telefutura from 2003 as part of Toonturama on Saturday and Sunday Morning Block along with The Twisted Tales of Felix the Cat and Mortal Kombat: Defenders of the Realm.

== Plot ==
Bruno the Kid follows Bruno, an 11-year-old boy who becomes a top spy for a secret espionage organization. The organization, named GLOBE, contacts Bruno via his computer and a special gadget watch, and is completely unaware of its top spy's young age, as he hides behind an adult avatar.

The members of GLOBE that Bruno works with in person, such as Jarlsburg (voiced by Tony Jay) and Harris (voiced by Mark Hamill), are also unaware that GLOBE does not know Bruno's actual age, and assume that the organization must know what it is doing in sending the boy into dangerous situations.

With an alibi or decoy set up at home, Bruno sets out saving the world, or foiling a major heist with the aid of his British spy partner Jarlsburg. Later in the series, Jarlsburg quits being Bruno's partner, after hesitating to fire a weapon in fear that he will hit Bruno. Bruno objects to Jarley quitting the team. Jarley eventually comes to his senses and returns to being Bruno's partner. He apologizes to Bruno for quitting. In the course of each mission, they usually meet Harris (a spoof of James Bond character Q), who supplies Bruno with gadgets.

In addition to voicing Bruno, Bruce Willis was one of the series' executive producers and also co-wrote and performed the theme song.

== Cast and characters ==
=== Heroes ===
- Bruce Willis as Bruno the Kid
- Tony Jay as Jarlesburg
- Mark Hamill as Harris

=== Villains ===
- Tim Curry as Lazlo Gigahurtz
- Kenneth Mars as Professor Von Trapp
- Bronson Pinchot as General Armando Castrato
- René Auberjonois as Leonard DaLinguini
- Matt Frewer as Booby Vicious
- Dawnn Lewis as Di Archer
- Edward Asner as the Engineer
- Ed McMahon as the Engineer's henchman
- Frank Welker as Koos Koos

=== Other characters ===
- Jennifer Hale as Leecy Davidson
- John Bower as Howard, Bruno's father
- Kath Soucie as Grace, Bruno's mother

=== Additional voices ===
- Frank Welker
- Earl Boen
- Ed Gilbert
- Kenneth Mars

== Episodes ==
=== Series overview ===
Season	Episodes	Originally released	
Season	Episodes	First released	Last released
1	36	September 23, 1996	May 26, 1997

No.	Title	Original release date
1	"The Adventure Begins"	September 23, 1996
Colonel Muckbar buys the BLAP disk from Lazlo Gigahertz and threatens to blow up the Hoover Dam unless he gets 2 billion dollars.
2	"Spies, Lies & Bavarian Pies"	September 30, 1996
Von Trapp steals the BLAP disc from Jarlsburg and plans to hold the world hostage.
3	"North by Southwest"	October 7, 1996
Mister X buys stolen Russian warheads and plans to blow up Mount Vicemore at the unveiling ceremony.
4	"Take Me Out to the Bomb Game"	October 14, 1996
Castrato steals a nuclear missile and detonator, and plans to use it unless he receives 50 billion dollars and the New York Yankees.
5	"High Tide"	October 21, 1996
Cy Cologne plans to melt the world's icebergs, which will cause an enormous tidal wave that will destroy half the world.
6	"Moonbeam & Other Strangers"	October 28, 1996
Dr. Moonbeam steals DOGSLED defense weapons and threatens to destroy national landmarks.
7	"Give Pizza a Chance"	November 4, 1996
Lazlo Gigahertz kidnaps several European leaders and uses Bruno to replace them with robots.
8	"Chip Happens"	November 11, 1996
Ramon Ramon shoots down the GLOBE satellite and steals the chip inside, which will enable him to control all electronic communications in the world.
9	"Mind Over Matter"	November 18, 1996
Von Trapp kidnaps Profession Wisenstein, creator of a mind-reading machine, and builds one of his own. He plans to use it on Swiss bankers to get the combinations to their vaults.
10	"Searching for Booby Vicious"	November 25, 1996
Former chess champion Booby Vicious builds a device to take out radar systems. Bruno must win a game of riddles within 24 hours, or he will destroy the major cities of the world.
11	"The Fission Mission"	December 2, 1996
Mister X kidnaps world leaders, and the ransom is the uranium he needs for his atomic warhead detonator device.
12	"The A-maze-ing Adventure"	December 9, 1996
Lady Di Archer steals a ceremonial scepter so that war between Jumai and Bakare will continue and diamonds cannot be mined.
13	"Jungle Bogey"	December 16, 1996
Dr. Benny Butterfinger steals the Thelma – a silent, undetectable plane – and will start bombing world capitals unless he receives 3 billion dollars.
14	"Bruno-palooza"	December 23, 1996
Armand Geddon steals the explosive Ultra-Blastite, to be triggered by Slather's high notes at the upcoming "Peaceapalooza" concert.
15	"Fade to Bruno"	December 30, 1996
Hollywood director Stuart Pede puts subliminal messages in a movie that will make teenagers kill world leaders and do whatever else he tells them.
16	"The Spy Just Like Me"	January 6, 1997
Von Trapp has built a large "Grosse Gun" and will bombard oil fields unless OPEC gives him all of its oil. He uses a "kinder-spy" of his own to anticipate Bruno's every move.
17	"Shake, Rattle & Roll"	January 13, 1997
Lazlo Gigahertz creates an earthquake-causing machine, with which he plans to destroy the world's largest cities.
18	"Book 'Em Bruno, Murder One"	January 20, 1997
Ho Don Po develops a plastic explosive that allows him to set off dormant volcanoes; the lava flow will turn the ocean property he owns in Hawaii into beachfront property.
19	"Dr. Nozone"	January 27, 1997
Sunblock manufacturer Chick E. Love steals CFCs in order to eliminate the ozone layer and sell more sunblock.
20	"The Unfriendly Skies"	February 3, 1997
Ann T. Mayhem and her sons hijack plans and steal their parts to build a super-plane. They then threaten to bomb countries unless they receive a ransom.
21	"My Dogs Are Killin' Me"	February 10, 1997
Lazlo Gigahertz gains control over the dogs of the world, and plans to sic them on their masters unless he receives 1 billion dollars.
22	"Meteor Showers Bring No Flowers"	February 17, 1997
Mad inventor Leonardo Linguini builds a "Cosmic Hole Puncher" which he will use to punch the atmosphere so meteorites can reach the earth's surface. He will destroy every major world capital unless he receives 1 billion dollars.
23	"Bye Bye Jarly: Part One"	February 24, 1997
The bad guys, with Von Trapp as president, get together to take over the world. Their first step is stealing a new secret radar system. Jarlsburg loses his confidence and retires from GLOBE, leaving Bruno to deal with a new partner.
24	"Send in the Clones"	March 3, 1997
Von Trapp uses DNA samples to create an army of clones of infamous people throughout history, who will help him take over the world.
25	"Who's There?"	March 10, 1997
Dr Nick Knock develops a "Weather Anomalizer" that can alter the weather. He plans to use it to exact his revenge on the scientific community at a reception for Nobel Prize winners.
26	"For Your Snake Eyes Only"	March 17, 1997
Former Las Vegas magician Snake Eyes kidnaps 12-year-old religious leader Rama Rama, and will sacrifice him, causing mass riots and chaos, unless Rama Rama orders his followers to leave the scared Temple of Paneer.
27	"Funworld"	March 24, 1997
Vorga Lopez plans to overthrow her brother's government in Brazuela. She holds his son hostage at an amusement park, with the entire Brazuelan treasury as ransom.
28	"Soda Jerk"	March 31, 1997
Koos Koos manufactures a soft drink that contains a violence-inducing chemical. He plans to capitalize on arms sales when he starts an unstoppable world war.
29	"The Last Christmas"	April 7, 1997
Mad toy inventor Klaus Von Claus puts computer chips inside a popular type of doll, allowing him to bring them to life. He plans to use them to destroy the world on Christmas Eve at midnight.
30	"Revenge of the Giganerd"	April 14, 1997
Eugenie Scuzzybus uses Lazlo Gigahertz's technology to send a hypnotic signal through electrical wiring, making a zombie out of anyone who looks at a monitor or TV screen. Lazlo joins Bruno and Jarlsburg on their journey to stop Scuzzybus.
31	"Bye Bye Jarly: Part Two"	April 21, 1997
Continued from Part One.
32	"Bye Bye Jarly: Part Three"	April 28, 1997
Continued from Part Two.
33	"Bullet Train"	May 5, 1997
A man calling himself "the Engineer" takes over a new computerized rail system and threatens to derail every train on the planet.
34	"Dead Boy Walking"	May 12, 1997
Melbourne and Sydney G'Day plan to infect the world with a deadly virus, then sell the antidote and rake in the money.
35	"Virus"	May 19, 1997
Castrato brings down the GLOBE jet, equipped with a computer full of secret GLOBE information. Bruno retrieves the computer, but must take it back so Castrato can download a virus that will erase all the secret information he has learned.
36	"You Go, Girl"	May 26, 1997
Medusa has a "Molecular Reorganizer" which can turn water into gold and vice versa. She plans to steal the world's supply of gold in order to control the world. Leecy sneaks along on this mission and finds out about Bruno's secret life.

== Video and DVD release ==
Episodes were released on VHS by Family Home Entertainment, but as of December 2, 2009, there have been no plans for a U.S. DVD release. A compilation movie Bruno The Kid: The Animated Movie was released in 1996. The series is available on Tubi and The Roku Channel. The episodes were released out of order on Freevee but has long since been corrected on other streaming services.

In Italy in 2008, nine single DVD volumes were released with four episodes per volume with English soundtrack & English credits, which are now out of print.
