= Amigo and Friends =

- Title screen
- Based on: Cantinflashow by Mario Moreno Reyes
- Voices of: John Stephenson; Don Messick
- Countries of origin: Mexico; United States
- Original language: English
- No. of episodes: 52

Production
- Running time: 18–22 minutes
- Production companies: Televisa; Hanna-Barbera Productions

Original release
- Network: Syndication
- Release: 1982 – 1984

Amigo and Friends (also known in Spanish as Cantinflas y Sus Amigos) is an American-Mexican educational children's animated television series that was based on the Mexican cartoon series Cantinflashow in 1979. The show, which concentrates on a wide range of subjects intended to educate children, follows Amigo, a little comical character from Mexico, who goes on time-travel-themed educational adventures through spacetime. He gets to visit Shakespeare, see the ancient pyramids, and even travels to other planets. The animated Amigo is based on the legendary character, Cantinflas played by the Mexican actor and comedian Mario Moreno Reyes.

The show was created and produced by Televisa. The company was also responsible for the distribution of the show in Mexico.

In 1982, Hanna-Barbera Productions produced Amigo and Friends and aired in syndication across the United States through Viacom Enterprises. The only two known actors were John Stephenson, who narrates each episode and Don Messick, who voiced Amigo.

== Home media ==
Sometime in the 1980s, a couple of episodes were released on video by Family Home Entertainment. In 2004, BCI released some of the shorts as part of the Cantinflas Show collection.

== Episodes ==
1. Meets Alexander Bell
2. Visits the Amazon
3. Meets Amerigo Vespucci
4. Learns Atomic Energy
5. Meets Baseball
6. Visits the Canals of Venice
7. Meets Captain Cook
8. Visit the Colosseum
9. Meets the Constellations
10. Meets Daniel Boone
11. Meets Don Quixote
12. Visit the Eiffel Tower
13. Meets Eli Whitney and the cotton gin
14. Visit the Estate of Vatican City
15. Meets Father Junipero Serra
16. Learns the game of rugby
17. Meets Genghis Khan
18. Meets George Washington Carver
19. Visit the Grand Canyon
20. Visit the great wall of china
21. Meets the golf story
22. Meets Henry Ford
23. In the international date line
24. Meet James Watt
25. Meets Julius Caesar
26. Meets King Tut
27. Meets Lewis and Clark
28. Meets the lost city of Atlantis
29. Meets Luther Burbank
30. Meets Madame Curie
31. Meets Michelangelo
32. Meets the Milky Way
33. Visit Mont Saint Michel
34. Climbs Mount Everest
35. On the Nile
36. Visit Notre Dame
37. Visit the Parthenon
38. Meets Picasso
39. Visit the planets
40. Visit the pyramids
41. Meets Rembrandt
42. Learns Safety tips
43. Meets Simon Bolivar
44. Meets Statue of Liberty
45. Meets Soccer
46. The Sun
47. Meets Tennis
48. Visit the Tower of London
49. Visit the Universe
50. Visit the Wailing Wall
51. Visit Yellowstone Park
52. Visit Yosemite
