= Odalys García =

Cuban actress, model and singer

- Born: Odalys García; October 23, 1975 (age 50); Havana, Cuba
- Occupations: Actress; model; singer; television presenter
- Height: 5' 7
- Website: Official website

Odalys García (Spanish pronunciation: [oˈðalis ɣaɾˈsi.a]; born October 23, 1975) is a Cuban actress, model, singer and television presenter.

== Biography ==
García, born in Havana, Cuba, started by participating in dance demonstrations by the age of eight. At nine, she was admitted to the Alicia Alonso School of Ballet.

When Odalys was 13, she arrived in Miami, where she began a career in modeling. In 1991, she was cast to host Noche de Gigantes (Night of the Giants) by Univision, alongside Don Francisco. Garcia and Don Francisco became friends during the two years she was in the show, and she started to become famous to Hispanic audiences with her voluptuous figure.

Soon, she was chosen to host De Pelicula, a Saturday afternoon movies show. But her biggest break came in 1993, when she was chosen to participate in Lente Loco (Crazy Lens), as Pupu Pirú, a show that was like a Spanish version of Candid Camera. Lente Loco became a big hit among Univision's target audiences, and Odalys' fame went off the roof. Within years, she was producing calendars, being the object of romance rumors by many magazines, and becoming the spokeswoman of Columbia House's Club Musica Latina. She also had the opportunity to act in a Spanish soap opera, named Morelia, and she was disc jockey at a morning radio show at Florida's station, WQBA. She is also a spokeswoman for Bally Total Fitness.

Odalys García is also an executive producer and singer. Her calendars have sold well over the years, her 2001 version selling 200,000 copies, and she also produces a video to accompany her calendars.
