= El Club de Los Tigritos =

- Also known as: Club Tigritos
- Genre: Variety show
- Directed by: Eduardo Pérez; Vladimir Perez
- Presented by: Wanda D'Isidoro; Yalimar Salomón
- Country of origin: Venezuela
- Original language: Spanish
- No. of seasons: 3
- No. of episodes: (list of episodes)

Production
- Production locations: Mata de Cocos, Caracas, Venezuela
- Production company: Univision

Original release
- Network: Venevisión
- Release: 1994 – 1999

Related
- Rugemanía

El Club de Los Tigritos (The Tigers Club) is a Spanish-language children's variety program originating in Venezuela on the Venevision television network beginning in 1994, and syndicated to other stations and networks around the world. In 2000, the show became Rugemania. The show was notable for featuring almost entirely children and teenagers as performers and hosts, and it consisted of various segments of singing, dancing, and acting. The dance group was known as the Ballet de Marjorie Flores after its teacher and choreographer.
