= List of programming blocks by name =

The following is a list of television programming blocks.

== 0–9 ==
- 4Kids TV (2002–2008)

== A ==
- ABC Daytime (1948–present)
- ABC Kids (United States) (1997–2011)
- ABC Kids (Australia) (1991–present)
- ABC's Wide World of Entertainment (1973–present)
- ABC 4 Kids (2011–2015)
- ACME Night
- Action Pack (1994–2011)
- Adult Swim
- Adult Swim (Australia) (2005–2019)
- Adult Swim (UK & Ireland) (2006–2013, 2015–2017, 2019–present)
- AKTV (2011–2013)
- Animation Domination (2005–2014, 2019–present)
- Animation Domination (Australia)
- Animation Fixation
- Animation Salvation
- Anime Complex (1998–2001)
- Anime Current (2006–2008)
- Aussie Gold (2008)
- Animation Rules (2005–2014, 2019–present)

== B ==
- Belajar dari Rumah (2020–2023)
- Big Fun Weeknights
- Bionix
- BKN
- Book TV

== C ==
- Cartoon Quest
- Cartoonito
- CBBC
- CBS Block Party
- CBS Daytime
- CBS Kidshow
- CBS Weekend
- Chispavision
- CITV
- CNN Newsroom
- Comedytime Saturday
- Cookie Jar Kids Network
- Cookie Jar Toons
- Cookie Jar TV
- Crimetime After Primetime
- Crimetime Saturday
- Cúla 4
- Cyw

== D ==
- Discovery Kids on NBC
- Disney Channel Saturday Mornings
- Disney Jr.
- Disney's One Too

== F ==
- FoxBox
- Fox Kids
- Fred Flintstone and Friends
- Friday Night Stand-Up with Greg Giraldo
- Fully Baked on FX

== G ==
- Galamiguitos (1999–2002, 2016–present)
- Get Real! (2007–2008)
- Giorgiomania (1997–1999)
- Gotta See Saturdays (2012–2013)

== H ==
- Hanna–Barbera's World of Super Adventure

== J ==
- Jetix

== K ==
- Kids' CBC
- Kids' WB
- Kids' WB Australia
- KidsClick

== L ==
- La Piñata Loca (Univision)
- Limbo
- LittleBe
- Litton's Weekend Adventure
- Lose Control

== M ==
- Marvel Action Universe
- Mi Tele
- MiTelemundo
- Mixy
- Milkshake!
- Mornings on Ten
- Musical Mornings with Coo
- Must See TV
- MSNBC Reports

== N ==
- NBC Daytime
- NBC Kids
- Nick: The Smart Place to Play
- Nick in the Afternoon
- Nick Jr.
- NickMom
- NickRewind
- Nickelodeon en Telemundo
- Nickelodeon on CBS
- Nickelodeon Splat!
- Nickel-O-Zone
- Nick Studio 10
- Nick at Nite
- NoitaminA

== O ==
- One Magnificent Morning
- Operation Prime Time

== P ==
- PBS Kids
- PBS Kids Go!
- Pillow Head Hour
- Planeta U
- Platavision
- PBS Kids Bookworm Bunch
- Playhouse Disney

== Q ==
- Qubo (2006–2021)
- Qubo Night Owl (2010–2019)

== R ==
- Ready Set Learn
- Rage

== S ==
- S.C.I.F.I. World
- Saturday Disney
- Saturday Supercade
- Scooby's All-Star Laff-A-Lympics
- SNICK
- Stwnsh
- Sunny Side Up Show
- Super Hero Time
- Super Sunday
- Super Fun Saturdays

== T ==
- TEENick
- TeenNick (UK & Ireland)
- Telemundo Infantil
- Telemundo Kids
- Telemuñequitos
- Teletoon at Night
- TGIF
- The Animation Station (1995–1997)
- The CW Daytime
- The CW4Kids
- The Disney Afternoon
- The Funtastic World of Hanna-Barbera
- The Good Night Show (2005–2017)
- The Marvel Action Hour
- The More You Know
- The Rudy and Gogo World Famous Cartoon Show (1995–1997)
- The Trifect
- The Zone
- TNBC
- Tom and Jerry's Funhouse on TBS
- Too Funny To Sleep
- Toon Disney
- Tickle U
- Toonami
- Toonami (Australia)
- Toonami (Pakistan)
- Toonin' Saturdays
- Toonturama
- Toonturama Junior
- Toonzai
- Tube Time
- TVOKids

== U ==
- UPN Kids (1995–1999)
- USA Action Extreme Team (1995–1998)
- USA Cartoon Express (1982–1996)
- Univision y Los Niños (1989–1993)
- Univision Infantiles

== V ==
- Vortexx (2012–2014)

== W ==
- Wiggly Waffle (2009–2010)
- What a Cartoon! (2005–2008)

== X ==
- Xploration Station (2014–present)

== Y ==
- YTV Jr. (1994–2002)

== ¡ ==
- ¡De Cabeza! (Univision)

== See also ==
- Block programming
- List of animated programming blocks
- List of Disney TV programming blocks
- List of programming blocks by Cartoon Network (Philippines)
