= Lists of programming blocks =

Groups of TV/radio shows broadcast together

The following is a list of lists of programming blocks.

== Listings by name and date ==
- List of programming blocks by name

== Listings by genre or characteristic ==
- List of animated programming blocks

== Listings by company ==
- List of Disney TV programming blocks

== Listings by television network ==
- List of programming blocks by Cartoon Network (Philippines)
- List of programming blocks by YTV
- Cartoon Network (Australia and New Zealand)
- List of programming blocks by Cartoon Network (UK & Ireland)
- List of programming blocks by Nickelodeon
- List of programming blocks by Cartoon Network (Latin America)
- List of programming blocks by Cartoon Network
- List of programming blocks by Teletoon
