= Lose Control =

Lose Control may refer to:

== Music ==
=== Albums ===
- Lose Control (album) or the title song, by Silk, 1992
- Lose Control (EP) or the title song (see below), by Lay, 2016
- Lose Control, by Ricky J, 2001

=== Songs ===
- "Lose Control" (Hedley song), 2016
- "Lose Control" (Kish Mauve song), 2008
- "Lose Control" (Lay song), 2016
- "Lose Control" (Meduza, Becky Hill and Goodboys song), 2019
- "Lose Control" (Missy Elliott song), 2005
- "Lose Control" (Teddy Swims song), 2023
- "Lose Control" (Waldo's People song), 2008
- "Lose Control (Let Me Down)", by Keri Hilson, 2011
- "Shinshoku (Lose Control)", by L'Arc-en-Ciel, 1998
- "Lose Control", by Ash from 1977, 1996
- "Lose Control", by the Courteeners from Anna, 2013
- "Lose Control", by Evanescence from The Open Door, 2006
- "Lose Control", by James from Gold Mother, 1990
- "Lose Control", by JJ Lin from Shang-Chi and the Legend of the Ten Rings: The Album, 2021
- "Lose Control", by Kevin Federline from Playing with Fire, 2006
- "Lose Control", by Matt Simons, 2016
- "Lose Control", by Motion City Soundtrack from Panic Stations, 2015
- "Lose Control", by Robyn & La Bagatelle Magique from Love Is Free, 2015
- "Lose Control", by the Saturdays from Wordshaker, 2009
- "Lose Control", by Timbaland from Shock Value II, 2009
- "Lose Control", by Yeat featuring Elton John from ADL, 2026

== Other uses ==
- Lose Control (TV programming block), a former programming block on Disney Channel India

== See also ==
- Losing Control (disambiguation)
- Loses Control, a 2003 album by Hey Mercedes
- Lost Control (disambiguation)
