= Ka-Anival!! =

Japanese late-night anime programming block

- Network: Kansai TV
- Launched: January 6, 2026; 8 months ago
- Division of: FNS
- Country of origin: Japan
- Sister network: Fuji TV
- Format: Anime
- Running time: Tuesdays 23:00–23:30 (JST)
- Original language: Japanese
- Official website: Official website

Ka-Anival!! (Japanese: 火アニバル!! (かアニバル), romanized: Ka-Anibaru) is a Japanese late-night anime programming block planned and produced by Kansai TV under the FNS affiliation. The block premiered in January 2026 and airs on Tuesday nights from 23:00 to 23:30 JST.

== History ==
On October 23, 2025, Kansai TV announced the launch of the new anime programming block, replacing the "Kadora Eleven" TV drama programming block which was established since April 2023 on the same timeslot.

The block's title is a pun on the word "carnival", and features the words "Ka" (火) for Tuesday, "Ani" (アニ) for anime, and "val" ("baru" (バル) in katakana) to represent "bar" (as in tavern), with the two exclamation points representing the 11:00 p.m. timeslot, embodying the idea of "wanting to make a timeslot where everyone can gather in front of the TV at night, and broadcast anime that captivates the world."

Tune In to the Midnight Heart became the first program to air on the timeslot.

== Titles ==
No.	Title	Start date	End date	Eps.	Studio(s)	Notes	Ref.
1	Tune In to the Midnight Heart	January 6, 2026	March 24, 2026	12	Gekkou	Based on the manga series by Masakuni Igarashi.	
2	Marriagetoxin	April 7, 2026	June 30, 2026	13	Bones Film	Based on the manga series by Joumyaku and Mizuki Yoda.	
3	The Ghost in the Shell	July 7, 2026	September 8, 2026	10	Science Saru	Based on the manga series by Masamune Shirow.	
4	Super Psychic Policeman Chojo	October 6, 2026	December 2026	TBA	Arvo Animation	Based on the manga series by Shun Numa.	
5	Marriagetoxin (Season 2)	January 2027	TBA	TBA	Bones Film	Sequel to Marriagetoxin.	

== See also ==
- Late-night anime programming blocks in Japan
- Other anime programming blocks by FNS
  - +Ultra, airing on Wednesday nights.
  - noitaminA, airing on Friday nights.
