= USA Cartoon Express =

American television programming block

- Final logo, used to 1992 to 1996
- Network: USA Network
- Launched: September 20, 1982; 43 years ago
- Closed: September 15, 1996; 29 years ago
- Country of origin: United States
- Sister network: USA Action Extreme Team (1995–1998)
- Format: Children's programming
- Running time: 1-6 hours
- Original language: English
- Voices of: Curt Chaplin (1982–1992)

The USA Cartoon Express was a programming block consisting of animated children's series which aired on the USA Network from September 20, 1982 to September 15, 1996. Cartoon Express was the first structured animation block on cable television, predating Nickelodeon's Nicktoons and Cartoon Network by a decade.

== History ==
In September 1982, USA Cartoon Express was announced by USA as one of six new shows on its fall schedule as the network began broadcasting 24 hours a day, 7 days a week. The Express originally aired during the early evening hours, replacing a prior block called Calliope which continued to air on Sunday mornings until 1993. Eventually, a "Sunday Cartoon Express" would debut that took up the full Sunday morning. Curt Chaplin served as the unseen "Cartoon Announcer", providing voice-overs for the block's opening, closing and commercial bumpers, continuing in this role until 1992.

=== Hanna-Barbera ===
The initial lineup consisted mostly of series from the Hanna-Barbera library. Well-known properties like Scooby-Doo, Huckleberry Hound, Yogi Bear, Space Ghost, The Smurfs, and Jonny Quest shared space with lesser-known properties like Wheelie and the Chopper Bunch, Inch High, Private Eye, Dynomutt, Dog Wonder, and countless others, as well as numerous spin-offs of The Flintstones such as The Pebbles and Bamm-Bamm Show.

By the end of the 1980s, more cartoons aired on the Cartoon Express, including Fat Albert and the Cosby Kids, He-Man and the Masters of the Universe, Jem, G.I. Joe, and The Real Ghostbusters.

In 1991, Cartoon Express premiered Voltron and Denver, the Last Dinosaur, two series from World Events Productions. In October, Turner Broadcasting purchased Hanna-Barbera and launched Cartoon Network one year later, thus taking a chunk of Cartoon Express programming with it. The only Hanna-Barbera shows on the Cartoon Express afterwards were The Smurfs and Scooby-Doo, which left the Express in 1993 and 1994 respectively.

=== Changes for 1993, the USA Action Extreme Team and the end of the Express ===
In the summer of 1993, Cartoon Express paired Denver, the Last Dinosaur with the new series Dinosaucers to capitalize on the popularity of Jurassic Park. In the fall, Cartoon Express introduced two original series, Itsy Bitsy Spider and Problem Child (based on the film franchise). Teenage Mutant Ninja Turtles became the new marquee series on the block, and USA also acquired the broadcast rights to Terrytoons shorts like Deputy Dawg and Mighty Mouse. From 1994 to 1995, several DIC Entertainment series were shown on Cartoon Express.

In 1995, USA Network premiered USA Action Extreme Team with the launch of shows based on the Street Fighter II video game franchise and Savage Dragon comic book franchise; it initially aired only on weekend mornings. The Cartoon Express left the station for the last time on September 15, 1996; the USA Action Extreme Team would inherit the Cartoon Express's timeslots and continue for two more years before ending in late 1998 as USA Networks cut its animation blocks on most of its outlets, including Sci-Fi Channel's Animation Station.

== Programs aired on USA Cartoon Express ==
=== Hanna-Barbera ===
- The Addams Family
- The Amazing Chan and the Chan Clan
- The Banana Splits
- The Biskitts
- Buford and the Galloping Ghost
- Butch Cassidy and the Sundance Kids
- Captain Caveman and the Teen Angels
- Challenge of the GoBots
- Clue Club
- Devlin
- Dynomutt, Dog Wonder
- The Flintstone Comedy Hour
- The Funky Phantom
- Galaxy Goof-Ups
- Goober and the Ghost Chasers
- The Great Grape Ape Show
- Help!... It's the Hair Bear Bunch!
- The Herculoids
- Hong Kong Phooey (1986–92)
- Huckleberry Hound and his Friends
- Inch High, Private Eye
- Jabberjaw (1989–92)
- Jana of the Jungle
- The Jetsons
- Jonny Quest
- Josie and the Pussycats
- Josie and the Pussycats in Outer Space
- The Kwicky Koala Show
- Laff-A-Lympics
- Magilla Gorilla/Quick Draw McGraw/Wally Gator/Loopy De Loop
- Monchhichis
- The New Fred and Barney Show
- Pac-Man (1986–92)
- Paw Paws
- The Pebbles and Bamm-Bamm Show
- Popeye and Son (1989–90)
- Richie Rich
- The Robonic Stooges
- The Roman Holidays
- The Ruff and Reddy Show
- Scooby-Doo (1990–94)
- Sealab 2020
- Shirt Tales
- The Skatebirds
- The Smurfs (1990–93)
- The Snorks
- The Space Kidettes
- Space Ghost and Dino Boy (minus the Dino Boy segments)
- Space Stars (minus the Astro and the Space Mutts segments)
- Speed Buggy
- Trollkins
- Valley of the Dinosaurs
- Wacky Races
- Wait Till Your Father Gets Home
- Wheelie and the Chopper Bunch
- Where's Huddles?
- Wildfire
- The Yogi Bear Show (1985–88)
- Yogi's Gang
- Yogi's Space Race (1989–92)
- Yogi's Treasure Hunt
- Young Samson & Goliath

=== Other series ===
- Sport Billy (1983)
- Thundarr the Barbarian (1985–92)
- The Great Space Coaster (1987)
- Dragon's Lair (1987–92)
- Mister T (1987–88)
- Turbo Teen (1987–88)
- Fat Albert and the Cosby Kids (1988–89)
- She-Ra: Princess of Power (1988–89)
- The Famous Adventures of Mr. Magoo (1989–90)
- He-Man and the Masters of the Universe (1989–90)
- Jem (1989–92)
- Denver, the Last Dinosaur (1991–95)
- Voltron (1991–93)
- G.I. Joe: A Real American Hero (1992–96)
- The Real Ghostbusters (1992–94)
- Dinosaucers (1993–95)
- Teenage Mutant Ninja Turtles (1993–96)
- Terrytoons (1993–95)
- The Adventures of Super Mario Bros. 3 (1994–95)
- Cadillacs and Dinosaurs (1994–95)
- Captain N & The Video Game Masters (1994)
- The Chipmunks Go to the Movies (1994–95)
- Hulk Hogan's Rock 'n' Wrestling (1994–95)
- Jayce and the Wheeled Warriors (1994–95)
- Maxie's World (1994)
- Pole Position (1994–95)
- Adventures of Sonic the Hedgehog (1995–96)
- COPS (1995)
- The Superman/Batman Adventures (1995–96)
- The Woody Woodpecker Show (1995–96)

=== USA Cartoon Express original series ===
- The Itsy Bitsy Spider (1993–1996)
- Problem Child (1993–1994)
- Highlander: The Animated Series (1994–1996)

=== Shorts ===
- In a Minute (1983–96)
- USA Network Kids Club (1985–97)
- Monster Bash (1992–96)

=== TV specials ===
- Mr. Magoo's Christmas Carol (1987, 1989–90)
- The Fat Albert Christmas Special (1988)
- The Fat Albert Halloween Special (1988)
- He-Man & She-Ra: A Christmas Special (1988–89)
- A Snow White Christmas (1988)
- A Christmas Adventure (1989)
- Santa and the Three Bears (1989–95)
- A Chipmunk Christmas (1990–97)
- Baby's First Christmas (1990–92)
- Buttons & Rusty: The Christmas Tree Train (1990–93)
- Buttons & Rusty: The Turkey Caper (1990–93)
- Buttons & Rusty: Which Witch is Which? (1990–93)
- The Smurfs' Christmas Special (1990–91)
- The Christmas Tree (1991–93)
- Buttons & Rusty: A Chucklewood Easter (1991–94)
- Buttons & Rusty: The Adventure Machine (1992–93)
- Buttons & Rusty: What's Up Mom? (1992–93)
- The Elf Who Saved Christmas (1992–97)
- Rockin' Through the Decades (1992–98)
- The Smurfs' Halloween (1992)
- The Canterville Ghost (1993–97)
- Christmas Every Day (1993–97)
- The Elf and the Magic Key (1993–97)
- The Adventures of Corduroy (1996–97)
- Sonic Christmas Blast (1996–97)

== See also ==
- The Animation Station
- Cartoon Quest
