= Marriagetoxin =

Japanese manga series by Joumyaku and Mizuki Yoda

- First tankōbon volume cover, featuring Hikaru Gero (left) and Mei Kinosaki (right)

マリッジトキシン (Marijjitokishin)
- Genre: Action; Romantic comedy
- Manga
- Written by: Joumyaku
- Illustrated by: Mizuki Yoda
- Published by: Shueisha
- English publisher: NA: Viz Media
- Imprint: Jump Comics+
- Magazine: Shōnen Jump+
- Original run: April 20, 2022 – present
- Volumes: 19
- Anime television series
- Directed by: Motonobu Hori
- Written by: Kimiko Ueno
- Music by: Taisei Iwasaki; yuma yamaguchi
- Studio: Bones Film
- Licensed by: Crunchyroll: SEA: Muse Communication
- Original network: FNS (Kansai TV, Fuji TV)
- Original run: April 7, 2026 – present
- Episodes: 13
- icon

Marriagetoxin (Japanese: マリッジトキシン, Hepburn: Marijjitokishin; stylized in all caps) is a Japanese web manga series written by Joumyaku and illustrated by Mizuki Yoda. It has been serialized in Shueisha's Shōnen Jump+ app and website since April 2022, with its chapters collected in 19 tankōbon volumes as of October 2026. Viz Media licensed the series for English release. An anime television series adaptation produced by Bones Film aired from April to June 2026. A second season is set to premiere in January 2027.

== Plot ==
Hikaru Gero is a young man from the Poison Clan of professional assassins, which has been in existence for hundreds of years. Because he deals in the dark side of society and has never lived a "normal life", he considers himself to have no prospects with women and has no interest in marriage. However, one day, the Poison Clan states that if Gero does not marry and produce an heir to carry on their lineage, they will force his younger sister into bearing a child against her wishes. Wanting to save his sister from such a fate, Gero asks one of his assassination targets to marry him. Though Gero’s offer is turned down, the aforementioned target, cross-dressing marriage swindler Mei Kinosaki, agrees to train Gero on how to date and to appeal to women, so that Gero can fulfill his goal of finding someone he truly wants to marry.

== Characters ==
=== Protagonists ===
Hikaru Gero (下呂 ヒカル, Gero Hikaru)
Voiced by: Kent Itō (PV), Haruki Ishiya (anime) (Japanese); Ethan Gallardo (English)
Gero is the designated heir of the Poison Clan, one of the Five Great Families of assassins. Under pressure to produce an heir to the Poison Clan, he vows to protect Kinosaki in exchange for his help in finding a bride.
Mei Kinosaki (城崎 メイ, Kinosaki Mei)
Voiced by: Reina Ueda (PV), Shion Wakayama (anime) (Japanese); Brittney Karbowski (English)
Kinosaki is a marriage swindler who has made countless men and women fall for them. Although Kinosaki dresses as a woman and is perceived by others as female, he is actually male and claims to be irresistible while dressed as a man.

=== Prospective partners ===
Kyoko Himekawa (姫川 杏子, Himekawa Kyoko)
Voiced by: Anna Nagase (Japanese); Maganda Marie (English)
A thief who returns stolen art to its rightful owners.
Shiori Ureshino (嬉野 シオリ, Ureshino Shiori)
Voiced by: Asaki Yuikawa (Japanese); Tia Ballard (English)
A kind but shy college student who will one day take over her family's party supply company.
Kimie Arashiyama (嵐山 キミ恵, Arashiyama Kimie)
Voiced by: Hinano Shirahama (Japanese); Elizabeth Maxwell (English)
The Hamster Master, whose family is a branch subordinate to the Beast Clan.
Chinatsu Akakura (赤倉 ちなつ, Akakura Chinatsu)
A "protector" who has skills similar to the assassin clans, but more useful for defense, as they have not specialized. Her weapon of choice is a metal-alloy barrier tape.
Makoto Himi (氷見 マコト, Himi Makoto)
Ureshino's friend, who can change her attitude from meek and mild to aggressive to suit the audience. Her father Yukio has made many sacrifices after the death of her mother.
Shizuku Ushio (潮 雫, Ushio Shizuku)
Voiced by: Mariya Ise (Japanese); Katelyn Barr (English)
The Water User, who comes from the Fire Clan.

=== Friends ===
Piichi Nakagawa (中川 桃壱, Nakagawa Piichi)
Voiced by: Shimba Tsuchiya (Japanese); Dallas Reid (English)
The Hit Man Hunter, an "ordinary guy" who has great talent with a knife. He wants to open a cafe with his girlfriend Marin and has decided to kill the assassins, starting with the Beast Clan, because he feels his potential patrons would not be able to dine in peace otherwise.
Akari Gero (下呂 アカリ, Gero Akari)
Voiced by: Haruka Shiraishi (Japanese); Taylor Murphy (English)
Sister to Hikaru Gero. Pressured by the family to produce an heir, she begins to give in, but her brother takes on the task himself, so she can continue living happily with her girlfriend.
Toshiki Hanamaki (花巻 トシキ, Hanamaki Toshiki)
Voiced by: Isamu Yūsen
Erina Zao (蔵王 エリナ, Zao Erina)
The only daughter of the head of a criminal organization; after he left, he was betrayed by his former colleagues and killed, and they now pursue Erina.
Genya Naruko (鳴子 弦弥, Naruko Genya)
Voiced by: Soma Saito (Japanese); Alex Hom (English)

=== Other Masters ===
Toshiro Dogo (道後 十四郎, Dogo Toshiro) (Beast)
Head of the Beast Clan and one of the Five Great Families. His animal partner species is a bat.
Tonako Dogo (道後 十七子, Dogo Tonako) (Beast)
New head of the Beast Clan and sister of Toshiro. Her animal partner species is a wolf.
Toshiki Hanamaki (花巻 トシキ, Hanamaki Toshiki) (Bug)
Voiced by: Isamu Yūsen (Japanese); Marcus D. Stimac (English)
His family is a branch subordinate to the Poison Clan. He is married to Anna Kawakita.
Tsunagi Hayato (繋 ハヤト, Hayato Tsunagi) (Needle)
His family is a branch subordinate to the Poison Clan.
Nagihiko Kushima (串間 薙彦, Kushima Nagihiko) (Spear)
Killed by Piichi; he was infamous for indiscriminate killing.
Byakko (白狐) (Bear)
From a family subordinate to the Beast Clan which are shunned as the "impure masters" because they skin their bear partners rather than control them.
Kazuma Kannawa (鉄輪 カズマ, Kannawa Kazuma) (Wind-Wheel)
The Kannawa family was thought to have died out before a trio of siblings, led by Kazuma, were hired to capture Erina Zao. He has a sister (Mitsuba) and brother (Kojiro).
Reiji Sakazuki (盃 レイジ, Sakazuki Reiji) (Ghost)
He uses weapons and belongings possessed by ghosts, either forcing humans to attack with cursed weapons or debuffing their abilities with spiritual mementoes.

== Media ==
=== Manga ===
Marriagetoxin is written by Joumyaku and illustrated by Mizuki Yoda. The manga was officially announced by Shueisha on April 11, 2022, and began its weekly serialization for free on the Shōnen Jump+ app and website on the 20th of the same month. Shueisha also simultaneously publishes the series in English for free on its Manga Plus platform.

In June 2023, Viz Media announced that they licensed the series for English release under the name Marriage Toxin.

==== Volumes ====
No.	Original release date	Original ISBN	English release date	English ISBN
1	August 4, 2022	978-4-08-883213-5	January 2, 2024	978-1-9747-4352-0
1. "The Poison Master's Hunt for a Bride" (毒使いの婚活, Doku Tsukai no Kon Katsu); 2. "Rough Around the Edges" (不束者ですが, Futsutsuka-sha de Suga); 3. "What Is Charm, Anyway?" (魅力って何?, Miryokutte Nani?); 4. "Commence Infiltration" (潜入開始, Sennyū Kaishi); 5. "Dreams" (幻覚, Genkaku); 6. "Thing I'd Be Willing to Trade My Life For" (命懸けても, Inochigakete mo)
Poison Clan Master Hikaru Gero is a killer with morals, targeting only what he calls "human scum", people who have ruined other people's lives; his emotional detachment makes him believe he must remain single, dooming the family line. However, after learning his friend, the Bug Master, has found love, and upon hearing his grandmother is forcing his younger sister Akari to marry against her wishes, he rescues his next target, Mei Kinosaki, rather than killing her. Kinosaki is a marriage swindler who has made countless men and women fall for her, and Gero asks her to help him find a wife. Initially, Gero's lack of personal charisma leads to numerous rejections, but after rescuing Kinosaki from a kidnapper, she realizes his charm lies in his assassin talents, and coaches him to save people as a meet cute. Gero takes a commission to rescue the thief Kyoko Himekawa, who is famous for returning art to its rightful owners; during her latest heist, she was kidnapped. The rescue goes awry when Gero faces Water Master Ushio and a fierce fight ensues.
2	November 4, 2022	978-4-08-883323-1	April 2, 2024	978-1-9747-4372-8
7. "First One" (初めての相手, Hajimete no Aite); 8. "Welcome Home" (おかえりなさい, Okaerinasai); 9. "Operation Date: Commence" (デート開始シャチ♪, Dēto Kaishi Shachi); 10. "Guard Duty" (護衛任務, Goei Ninmu); 11. "Sound Master" (音使い, Oto Tsukai); 12. "Lord Chladni" (くらどに様, Kuradoni-sama); 13. "Test of Courage" (肝試し, Kan Tameshi); 14. "Gonna Make Some Fun Music Together" (ド楽しめそう, Do Tanoshime-sō); 15. "Offering" (捧げ物, Sasagemono); Bonus Chapter 1
After the mission, Gero and Himekawa go on a date; he relates a story from his childhood, as coached by Kinosaki, and after she reciprocates, he asks to start out as friends. For his next gig, Gero becomes "Daigo Oshima", a bodyguard for Shiori Ureshino, the designated heir to a family party supply company, at the request of her uncle. Ureshino has social anxiety, making an awkward introduction at a college party; she is targeted by Naruko, a Sound Master hitman hired by her aunt. After an attack in the classroom fails, Naruko's next attempt takes place during an off-campus camping trip where Gero shows off his cooking skills and Ureshino charms the other students with close-up magic. Local legends state "Lord Chladni" protected the village from disasters in exchange for child sacrifices; Gero saves Ureshino from a hallucination which would have had fatal consequences at the sacrificial shrine. Although Gero upsets Naruko's hallucinogenic stringed instrument, Naruko makes a realistic "Lord Chladni" giant, convincing the other students to sacrifice Ureshino. In the bonus chapter, Kinosaki explains they dress as a woman because the clothes are more fun, and they would be irresistible as a man.
3	February 3, 2023	978-4-08-883333-0	July 2, 2024	978-1-9747-4612-5
16. "The Weak" (弱き者, Yowakimono); 17. "Bonfire" (キャンプファイヤー, Kyanpufaiyā); 18. "Together with Me" (私と一緒に, Watashi to Issho ni); 19. "One More Thing..." (また…, Mata...); 20. "The Bug Master's Wedding" (蟲使いの結婚式, Mushi Tsukai no Kekkonshiki); 21. "Entertainment" (余興, Yokyō); 22. "Sunset" (夕陽, Yūhi); 23. "All the Happiness in the World" (100000000幸, Okusachi); 24. "Hit Man Hunter" (殺し屋狩り, Koroshi Yakari); 25. "The Meeting" (寄合, Yoriai); Bonus Chapters 2 & 3
Naruko is defeated by Gero's poison trap and Ureshino uses illusions to dispel "Lord Chladni". She asks her aunt for her help to run the company and then invites Gero for a drink. Kinosaki and Gero attend the wedding of Bug Master Toshiki Hanamaki and Anna Kawakita, where they meet Needle Master Tsunagi and his three sons. During the ceremony, Gero fends off the Puppet Master's minion Yamada, who holds a grudge against Hanamaki, and the Bug Master explains how his branch family is subordinate to the Geros, one of the Five Great Families. After the wedding, Hamster Master Kimie Arashiyama hires Gero to protect her against the "Hit Man Hunter", who has killed the other masters in the Beast Clan. While Arashiyama introduces Gero to the Beast Clan, the Hunter takes Gero by surprise and stabs him. In the bonus chapters, Gero uses a toxin for more fun while Kinosaki sings karaoke, and he prepares a bento lunch for Himekawa.
4	April 4, 2023	978-4-08-883511-2	October 1, 2024	978-1-9747-4904-1
26. "Just a Normal Guy" (一般人, Ippanjin); 27. "Three Days Left" (あと3日, Ato Mikka); 28. "Ambush" (奇襲, Kishū); 29. "Birdsball" (鳥類野球(birds ball)); 30. "Cross Sanguination" (混ぜ血, Mazechi); 31. "Cheap Tricks" (小細工, Kozaiku); 32. "Together" (一緒に, Issho ni); 33. "Delicious" (美味いな, Umai na); 34. "Amateur Work" (素人い仕事, Amai Shigoto); Bonus Chapters 4 & 5
Gero is overwhelmed by Piichi, the Hit Man Hunter, but when Arashiyama leaps to Gero's defense, Piichi stops, saying they are different than the other Masters he had killed before. Piichi has targeted the Beast Clan (led by Toshiro Dogo, head of one of the Five Great Families); after Dogo activates Arashiyama's collar, it starts a three-day countdown to her doom. Approaching the Beast Clan's island, Arashiyama and Gero are split from Piichi and Kinosaki. After Gero defeats the Bird Master, Dogo challenges Gero and reveals his "cross sanguination" program to join strong bloodlines together; the Bird Master revives and adds the abilities of Spear Master Nagihiko Kushima, then collects a sample of Gero's blood before being defeated again. Meanwhile, Dogo's assistant Byakko collects a blood sample from Piichi. After resting and eating a meal prepared by Arashiyama, Gero defeats the Koala Master, but Dogo spirits Arashiyama away during the distraction and Gero is beaten by Dogo's innumerable goons until Water Master Ushio arrives to defend him. In the bonus chapters, Gero goes on a romantic fantasy date with Ureshino and Naruko reveals what is inside his unusually large backpack.
5	July 4, 2023	978-4-08-883581-5	January 7, 2025	978-1-9747-5159-4
35. "Water and Poison" (水と毒, Mizu to Doku); 36. "Useless" (役立たず, Yakudatazu); 37. "The Impure Master" (穢れ手, Kegarete); 38. "All Fired Up" (やる気, Yaruki); 39. "Honor" (誉れ, Homare); 40. "Offerings" (供物, Kumotsu); 41. "The Next Stage" (次の段階, Tsugi no Dankai); 42. "A Happy, Ordinary Life" (フツーの幸せ, Futsū no Shiawase); Bonus Chapter 6
Gero and Ushio combine their attacks to defeat the remaining Beast Clan members. Arashiyama has a flashback to her first encounter with Gero, when he rescued her from a failed mission, and calls together rats and hamsters to help her in the present. When Piichi and Kinosaki reach Dogo, Byakko delays them and Dogo transforms Byakko into "frankenbeast" Hyakko, using a bloodline combining 93 Beast Clan branch families. Hyakko beats down Piichi until his spirits are revived by an unexpected call from his girlfriend and he prevails; while Piichi recovers from the fight, Gero and Ushio finally join the others at the hideout. However, Dogo powers up with Hyakko's blood and knocks out the two masters and Piichi; pushed to the limit and realizing that he needs other people to achieve his goal for a happy, ordinary life, Gero reaches a new level. In the bonus chapter, Tsunagi's fear that Gero has a weird wedding gift is allayed when Hanamaki opens it, revealing towels folded as flowers, on Kinosaki's recommendation.
6	September 4, 2023	978-4-08-883704-8	April 1, 2025	978-1-9747-5230-0
43. "Essence" (心髄, Shinzui); 44. "Partner" (相棒獣(パートナー), Pātonā); 45. "Back to Square One..." (ゼロから…, Zero kara...); 46. "Thanks" (センキュな, Senkyu na); 47. "More" (もっと, Motto); 48. "Romantic Advice with Mei the Love Evangelist" (愛の伝道師メイの恋愛相談会, Ai no Dendōshi Mei no Renai Soudankai); 49. "The Man from the Branch Family" (次分家の男段階, Bunke no Otoko); 50. "The Gero Family's Future" (下呂家の将来(ミライ), Gero-ka no Mirai); 51. "Foundation" (礎, Ishizue); Bonus Chapters 7–10
Gero defeats Dogo with a refined poison which cannot be neutralized; in a last-ditch effort, Dogo attacks Kinosaki, but is paralyzed by Arashiyama, who rallies other Beast Clan branch families to control the beast partners in Dogo's blood. Byakko tries to escape with Dogo, but both are seized by a great wolf, the partner of Dogo's sister Tonako, who promises to punish them as the new head of the Beast Clan, then proposes marriage to Gero. During their victorious return, Piichi explains his strength comes from love and Arashiyama confesses she likes Gero but currently is not his equal, vowing to become stronger and win his heart; inspired by the women he has met, Gero also promises to work on himself. He struggles socially while Kinosaki dispenses love advice, but she says he is making steady progress. When Akari warns him about Teruaki Gero, a cousin who was engaged to her, Teruaki poisons the crowd around them and attacks Kinosaki while they visit their younger brother Okuto; during their fight, Teruaki begs Gero to kill him and concentrate on being the head of the Poison Clan, forgetting the distraction of marriage. In the bonus chapters, Himekawa flusters Gero with bikini photos, Ureshino bonds with him over the manga Ropes of Fate, Kinosaki hires Ushio for the fight against Dogo, and Piichi watches a movie with Marin.
7	December 4, 2023	978-4-08-883749-9	June 3, 2025	978-1-9747-5605-6
52. "It's Not Fair" (ズルいですよ, Zurui desu yo); 53. "For the Gero Family" (下呂家のために獣, Gero-ka no Tameni); 54. "Keep Out" (立ち入り禁止(KEEP OUT)); 55. "The Protector" (護り手, Mamorite); 56. "Becoming Stronger" (強くなれる, Tsuyoku Nareru); 57. "Save Her" (手伝ってよ, Tettsudatte yo); 58. "Excellent Affinity" (相性抜群, Aishō Batsugun); 59. "The Pinwheel Masters" (風車使い, Kazaguruma Tsukai); 60. "Partners" (仲間, Nakama); 61. "One Shot" (この一撃, Kono Ichigeki)
Gero weathers Teruaki's attacks, proving he has retained his strength, and earns Teruaki's blessing. Gero's next assignment, to drive Erina Zao to safety, accompanied by her charismatic protector Chinatsu Akakura, introduce themselves with a car crash. Zao is being targeted by Namegawa, her father's former criminal associate, who has hired three siblings (Kazuma, Mitsuba, and Kojiro Kannawa) from the Wind-Wheel Clan, previously thought extinct. Erina initially warns Gero not to fall in love with Akakura, but after seeing his abilities, encourages their match. As Erina is about to fly to safety, the Kannawa trio attack and Erina is kidnapped by Namegawa, but Akakura bursts into the compound to rescue her, boosted by Gero's toxin, and Gero stays behind to fight the Wind-Wheel users to facilitate the escape of Erina, Akakura and Kinosaki, but each eventually rejoins Gero to help him.
8	March 4, 2024	978-4-08-883873-1	August 5, 2025	978-1-9747-5597-4
62. "The Old Man's Blood" (オヤジの血, Oyaji no Chi); 63. "Operation Tear Down That Wall!" (心の壁ぶっ壊し大作戦!!, Kokoro no Kabe Bukkowashi Daisakusen!!); 64. "Only You" (「アナタしかいない」, "Anata Shika Inai"); 65. "Rental Boyfriend" (レンタル彼氏, Rentaru Kareshi); 66. "Do Whatever I Want" (やりたい放題, Yaritai Hōdai); 67. "My Daughter's Happiness" (娘の幸せ, Musume no Shiawase); 68. "Ghost Master" (『霊使い』, Rei Tsukai); 69. "Gratin" (グラタン, Guratan); 70. "Trash" (ゴミカス, Gomikasu); 71. "One Seriously Nosy Dude" (ド節介, Do Sekkai)
In the past, the Wind Clan declared war on the other specialist assassins, and the Five Great Families allied to wipe them out; Kazuma was saved by the sacrifice of the patriarch of the Wheels Clan. Erina beats Namegawa and the Wind-Wheel Clan take him away. Gero cooks a celebratory meal with Akakura as part of Erina's plan to bring them together, who orders them to share a passionate kiss. Ureshino introduces Gero to her friend Makoto Himi, who asks him to be a rental boyfriend to avoid an arranged marriage to Takeo Heiwajima, the son of a member of the National Diet. While Himi coaches Gero to meet her father Yukio, Heiwajima "marries" her without her consent in a dubious ceremony led by Ghost Master Sakazuki. At the Himi mansion, Sakazuki overpowers Gero and forces a confrontation between Himi and Yukio; he says she has not been grateful for his sacrifices, and she responds she never showed her true emotions to help ease his burden. Although they reconcile, Heiwajima forces her to agree to marry him to save her father's memories. Before the wedding, Naruko helps Gero recover from Sakazuki's debuff.
9	June 4, 2024	978-4-08-884036-9	October 7, 2025	978-1-9747-5808-1
72. "You Can Count On Me" (ド任せあれ, Do Makase are); 73. "The Birth of Human Trash" (ゴミカス誕生, Gomikasu Tanjō); 74. "Game Over" (ゲームオーバー, Gēmu Ōbā); 75. "The Finale" (ド解決, Do Kaiketsu); 76. "We're Materialistic" (俺たちゃ俗物, Oretacha Zokumotsu); 77. "Save This Part..." (ここから先は…, Koko Kara Saki wa...); 78. "Leo Beppu, the Crasher" (別府レオ推参, Beppu Reo Suisan); 79. "The Gun Masters Association" (『銃使い』組合, Jū Tsukai Kumiai); 80. "A Smile I'm Gonna Protect" (守りてえスマイル, Mamoritē Sumairu); 81. "Commenced Suppression" (鎮圧開始, Chinatsu Kaishi); Bonus chapter 11
With Naruko's help, Gero interrupts the wedding and stops Heiwajima from kissing Himi. Heiwajima had chosen Himi as a form of revenge, but is flabbergasted when she apologizes. Sakazuki throws off a shirt laden with debuffs and punches Gero unconscious; Gero is rescued by the spirit that had possessed him before, and she convinces other spirits to ally against Sakazuki. Defeated, his suicide attempt is thwarted by a compassionate Gero. Kinosaki's leaked information results in the downfall of Heiwajima's father. Himi is literally swept off her feet by Gero, and as thanks she takes him to a concert for Naruko's band, Bourgeoizie. Kinosaki teaches Gero about at-home dating strategies, and takes him to a high-end singles mixer to check his progress, where Leo Beppu crashes the party and proposes to her, but she is unmoved by his cliched dating tactics. Gero's latest investigation has led him to Gun Clan chairman Masato Shiragane, who admits the mixer is a ruse to gather extortion victims. Leo fights Gun Clan leader Miyuki, to stop the raid and protect Kinosaki, but Miyuki prevails. In the bonus chapter, Gero goes on a date with Arashiyama to a cat cafe.
10	August 2, 2024	978-4-08-884156-4	December 2, 2025	978-1-9747-5809-8
82. "How Do They Look?" (「似合ってる?」, "Niatteru?"); 83. "A Hundred Million Hells" (億辛, Okutsura); 84. "Danger!"; 85. "Just Married!"; 86. "Good Job!; 87. "Big Heart" (器BIG, Utsuwa BIG); 88. "Steal That Heart! Flirty Face-Off" (ハートを奪え! ドキメキデュエル, Hāto o Ubae! Dokimeki Dyueru); 89. "The Fire Masters" (炎使い, Honō Tsukai); 90. "Cursed Child" (忌み子, Imiko); 91. "The Way of the Flame" (火道, Kadō)
11	November 1, 2024	978-4-08-884302-5	February 3, 2026	978-1-9747-6106-7
92. "My Ally" (私の味方, Watashi no Mikata); 93. "Sneak Attack" (闇討ち, Yamiuchi); 94. "Demoted" (格下, Kakushita); 95. "Mother and Daughter" (母娘, Oyako); 96. "Final Flame" (終炎, Tsuien); 97. "Departure" (旅立ち, Tabidachi); 98. "Satisfied" (満点, Manten); 99. "News" (一報, Ippō); 100. "Operation Sweetheart" (恋人大作戦, Koibito Daisakusen); Bonus chapters 12–14
12	February 4, 2025	978-4-08-884434-3	April 7, 2026	978-1-9747-6107-4
101. "All on My Own" (ひとりぼっち, Hitori Bocchi); 102. "The Plunder King" (略奪王, Ryakudatsu Ō); 103. "Pure-Gold Crew Cut Bust" (純金角刈り像, Junkin Kakugarizō); 104. "Know When to Quit" (引き際, Hikigiwa); 105. "A Reassuring Ally" (心強い味方, Kokoro Zuyoi Mikata); 106. "Sorry I'm Late" (待たせたな, Matasetana); 107. "Heart Flutter" (『欲望の鼓動』, "Yokubō no Tokimeki"); 108. "Why I Care" (そういうとこ, Sōiu Toko); 109. "My Feelings" (自分の気持ち, Jibun no Kimochi); 110. "Gero" (下呂のこと, Gero no Koto); Bonus chapter 15
13	May 2, 2025	978-4-08-884544-9	June 9, 2026	978-1-9747-6576-8
111. "The Taste Master" (『味使い』, "Aji Tsukai"); 112. "Dynamite Friends" (ブッ翔んだ仲間, Buttonda Nakama); 113. "Team Gero" (チーム下呂, Chīmu Gero); 114. "A True Chef" (一人前, Ichininmae); 115. "Nabs" (ナベちゃ, Nabecha); 116. "Gifted" (逸材, Itsuzai); 117. "The Calamity" (天災, Tensai); 118. "I'll Be Waiting" (「待ってます」, "Mattemasu"); 119. "Failure of a Protector" (『護り手』失格, "Mamorite" Shikkaku); Bonus chapters 16–17
14	August 4, 2025	978-4-08-884679-8	August 11, 2026	978-1-9747-6846-2
120. Dare? (誰?); 121. Mata Ippo (また一歩); 122. Yume Utsutsu (夢現); 123. Kata o Narabete (肩を並べて); 124. Honmono (本物); 125. Ikizama (生き様); 126. Boku no Kimochi (ボクの気持ち); 127. Jikka (実家); 128. Jōdeki (上出来)
15	October 3, 2025	978-4-08-884781-8	October 6, 2026	978-1-9747-6846-2
129. Wedding Photo (ウェディングフォト); 130. Shachō Shikkaku (社長失格); 131. Cheat Day (チートデイ); 132. Shuzai (取材); 133. Suprise (サプライズ); 134. "Drone Tsukai" (『ドローン使い』); 135. Shachō Gōkaku (社長合格); 136. Kōei (光栄); 137. Sensei (先生)
16	January 5, 2026	978-4-08-884854-9	January 5, 2027	978-1-9747-6948-3
138. Oshie (教え); 139. Hitori Nokorazu (一人残らず); 140. Haisō (敗走); 141. "Sanctuary" (『聖獄(サンクチュアリ)』); 142. Tsugai (番(ツガイ)); 143. Shukuteki (宿敵); 144. Ketsubutsu (傑物); 145. Mezame (目覚め); 146. Ketsui (決意)
17	April 3, 2026	978-4-08-885061-0	—	—
147. Watashi no "Shigoto" (私の「仕事」); 148. Chōkyō (調教); 149. "Gorilla Tsukai" (『ゴリラ使い』); 150. "Yodomi" (『澱み』); 151. Mee Kimase (目エ醒ませ); 152. Fusawashii Aite (相応しい相手); 153. "Kekkon Kubiwa" (『結婚首輪』); 154. "Nezumi Tsukai" (『鼠使い』); 155. Saikai (再会)
18	July 3, 2026	978-4-08-885167-9	—	—
156. Indō (引導); 157. Don'na Tsura demo (どんな辛でも); 158. Tomodachi kara (友達から); 159. Ōji-sama (王子様); 160. Kusareen (腐れ縁); 161. Sayonara (さよなら); 162. Hikenai (退けない)
19	October 2, 2026	978-4-08-885232-4	—	—
163. Yakkai (厄介); 164. Uragiri (裏切ぎり); 165. Dasshutsu (脱出); 166. Shokō (曙光); 167. Kyūsoku (休息); 168. Atomawashi (後回し); 169. Rakusei (落成); 170. 『×× Tsukai』Kirishima (『××使』霧島); 171. Neya (閨)

==== Chapters not yet in tankōbon format ====
These chapters have yet to be published in a tankōbon volume.

- Chapters 172–186

=== Anime ===
An anime television series adaptation was announced on October 1, 2025. It is produced by Bones Film and directed by Motonobu Hori, with series composition and scripts handled by Kimiko Ueno, characters designed by Kōhei Tokuoka, who also served as chief animation director, and music composed by Taisei Iwasaki and Yuma Yamaguchi. The series aired from April 7 to June 30, 2026, on the brand new Ka-Anival!! programming block on Kansai TV, Fuji TV, and their affiliates. The opening theme song is "Kill or Kiss", performed by Yurina Hirate, and the ending theme song is "Shake Na Baby", performed by AKASAKI. Crunchyroll is streaming the series. Muse Communication licensed the series in Southeast Asia.

A second season was announced following the airing of the final episode. It is set to premiere in January 2027 on the same programming block.

==== Episodes ====
No.	Title	Directed by	Storyboarded by	Original release date
1	"The Poison Master's Search for a Bride"; Transliteration: "Dokuzukai no kon Katsu" (Japanese: 毒使いの婚活)	Motonobu Hori	Motonobu Hori	April 7, 2026
Assassin Hikaru Gero is told to marry and produce heirs for the Gero Poison Clan, but due to his reserved personality he insists on remaining single. He is hired to poison Mei Kinosaki, a swindler who targets rich men in marriage scams. As Mei is dying, Hikaru's sister Akari calls to inform him their grandmother is forcing her to leave her girlfriend to marry a man and produce the next heir instead of Hikaru. Wanting to help Akari, Hikaru impulsively offers to let Mei live in exchange for becoming his personal matchmaker to find a wife. Amused, Mei agrees, so Hikaru cures the poison and incapacitates the gangster that paid to have Mei killed. Akari is allowed to stay with her girlfriend and Hikaru is shocked to learn the real scam Mei pulls on victims is that he is actually a man who excels at scamming both men and women. Mei signs Hikaru onto dating services, but his awkward personality and assassin instincts repel every woman he meets. Mei decides to focus on finding anything remotely charming about him. On the way home, Mei is kidnapped by a gangster demanding to know why his brother, the man who paid to have Mei poisoned, suddenly retired. Hikaru saves Mei using acid to destroy the gangster’s car, who decides to retire alongside his brother. As Hikaru carries him to safety, Mei realizes he has found Hikaru’s charm.
2	"What is "Charm," Anyway?"; Transliteration: "Miryokutte Nani?" (Japanese: 魅力って何?)	Motonobu Hori	Shunsuke Okubo	April 14, 2026
Mei takes Hikaru to an art gallery on a cruise liner so he can practise first date etiquette. They spot artist Takeru Shiratori whose talent makes him popular despite his odd personality. Mei then reveals Hikaru’s charm is how his heroic side emerges when helping people, so if he can save a woman from danger, she might fall in love with him. A painting is stolen by master thief Kyoko Himekawa, who specialises in returning stolen art to the real owners. Kyoko is captured by Shizuku Ushio, an assassin with water manipulation skills. Mei advises Hikaru to accept jobs where women are in trouble and rescue them. As Kyoko is being held hostage in exchange for the rest of the artwork she has stolen, Hikaru accepts the job of rescuing her. During the rescue Hikaru battles Shizuku, but on realising they are both Masters Shizuku offers him a large bribe instead, as a battle between Masters could be devastating for both their clans. Hikaru refuses as his primary goal is impressing Kyoko. Shizuku scoffs at Hikaru’s desire for a normal married life, so in response he shatters her diving suits bulletproof glass helmet with his bare hands.
3	"My First"; Transliteration: "Hajimete no Aite" (Japanese: 初めての相手)	Yutaka Kagawa	Yutaka Kagawa	April 21, 2026
Kyoko jumps into the fight with Hikaru’s last remaining syringe, which Hikaru injects into Shizuku, paralysing her. From the rash on Shizuku’s face Hikaru realises she is allergic to oxygen, explaining why she lives inside a water-filled suit, so he mixes a curative cream for her, angering her. Kyoko returns the painting to the owners, the husband and daughter of the woman in the painting. Mei invites Kyoko to celebrate with him and Hikaru, but cancels at the last second so it is just Hikaru and Kyoko by themselves. Hikaru is so nervous Mei is forced to send him helpful text messages. Hikaru shares details of his lonely childhood training in poisons. Kyoko reveals she was an orphan until a rich, terminally ill man adopted her. When she discovered his art collection was all stolen, she spent her inherited fortune returning them to the rightful owners. Sensing the moment is perfect, Mei urges him to ask Kyoko to be his girlfriend, but Hikaru asks her to be his friend, explaining they barely know each other, but if they are friends then maybe love will come in time. Mei admits he did well but then claims finding a wife requires meeting multiple women, so he gets Hikaru a job guarding a CEO’s daughter.
4	"The Sound Master"; Transliteration: "Oto Tsukai" (Japanese: 音使い)	Shin'ichirō Ushijima	Shin'ichirō Ushijima	April 28, 2026
Hikaru accompanies his client, Shiori Ureshino, to a college mixer but finds she is so introverted talking to anyone makes her cry. Her uncle Mitsuhito reveals Shiori's deceased father Kazuhito designated her the next CEO of Balzak Party Supplies, but her aunt Futae wants Balzak for herself and hired an assassin. Hikaru goes undercover as Shiori's classmate and takes note of her suspicious classmate Naruko. Shiori admits she went to the mixer because she promised her father she would make friends. A month later Futae is furious Naruko has still not killed Shiori, though Naruko insists Hikaru is always in the way. He later uses a soundwave manipulation ability ability to collapse Shiori's college, with Hikaru barely saving her. Hikaru and Naruko both deduce their opponents are a Poison Master and a Sound Master respectively. Shiori still goes on her class camping trip, though several classmates are influenced by Naruko's mind-control soundwaves. Shiori has some success talking to people using magic tricks she learned working at Balzak. A classmate reveals the campground has a legend of Lord Chladni, a baby-eating deity in a nearby shrine. Naruko is shown setting up wires all throughout the forest.
5	"Lord Chladni"; Transliteration: "Kuradoni yō" (Japanese: くらどに様)	Daisuke Inoue	Hiroshi Hara & Yutaka Kagawa	May 5, 2026
During a test of courage, Hikaru inexplicably morphs into Chladni, causing Shiori to flee to the shrine and find a corrupted version of her father. Kazuhito claims she is an unworthy heir and manipulates her to hang herself, but the thought of dying without friends snaps her out of it. Hikaru reveals she has been hypnotised to hallucinate her fears. He deduces Futae needs Shiori's death to appear as suicide or accidental, limiting Naruko's options. As Shiori is too scared to run, Hikaru carries her. Naruko tracks them through his wires, constantly transmitting mind-altering vibrations. As her traumatic past makes her too easy to hypnotise, Hikaru sends Shiori away with Mei. Naruko uses extremely fine wire control to vibrate rock dust into a solid golem 100 feet tall to attack Hikaru. As the wires are acid-proof, Hikaru injects the trees with super strength fertiliser, causing them to grow and increase the tension on the wires until they snap. Naruko manipulates the students into believing the golem is Chladni. Due to a combination of Naruko's hypnosis and mass hysteria, the students decide Chladni must be calmed with the sacrifice of a child, so they pick Shiori as she is the youngest. Confident Shiori will be murdered in minutes, Naruko battles Hikaru with a violin.
6	"Together With Me"; Transliteration: "Watashi to Issho ni" (Japanese: 私と一緒に)	Yuzu Hori	Yuzu Hori	May 12, 2026
Naruko claims Shiori is too weak to survive as a CEO. Hikaru points out Shiori broke his hypnosis through her own willpower, so she is stronger than Naruko realises. Naruko finds a spot in the forest where trees are releasing Phytoncides, which he inhales to increase his lung power. Too late, he realises Hikaru has tricked him into inhaling poison. Hikaru punches him in the chest, damaging his lungs. Shiori invents a plan. Mei disguises Shiori as a witch, and with Shiori’s magic tricks and Hikaru’s flammable gas, they set the golem on fire and convince the students Shiori exorcised Chladni. Hikaru lets Naruko live, but advises him to face his own traumatic past, like Shiori. The students awaken convinced they had an unusual dream. Shiori rewards Hikaru with head pats, which he is unused to. Futae is furious, but Shiori recognises that Futae loves the company, so she offers to run Balzak together as aunt and niece. Futae realises she has been selfish, so she promises to train Shiori into an excellent CEO. Hikaru decides Shiori is too good to be an assassin’s wife so he tries to sneak away. However, Shiori declares her intent to fall in love with Hikaru and trades phone numbers with him. Mei plans to move on to the next girl, but Hikaru reveals he will be busy with a friend’s wedding.
7	"The Bug Master's Wedding"; Transliteration: "Mushi Tsukai no Kekkonshiki" (Japanese: 蟲使いの結婚式)	Naomi Mikamiyama	Jong Heo	May 19, 2026
Hikaru's friend Toshiki the Bug Master, invites both Hikaru and Mei to his wedding to Anne, a normal civilian. Hikaru introduces Mei to another friend, Tsunagi the Needle Master. Toshiki's tarantula Julia Jr. warns Hikaru of a threat to the wedding. Yamada, a suicide bomber who gave up his limbs in explosions, targets the wedding because Toshiki prevented him setting off his final bomb in his skull. Using prosthetic limbs provided by Puppet Master, Yamada plans to assassinate Anne. With Hikaru fighting Yamada, Mei gives his speech on his behalf, crediting Toshiki with inspiring him to find love. When Yamada sees even a bloodthirsty Master like Toshiki can fall in love, he detaches his limbs to redirect the explosion to the clouds, exposing the sunset for the wedding. Toshiki reveals to Mei he considers himself lucky to be Hikaru's friend, as the Bug and Needle clans are branch families of the Poison Clan, making Hikaru his direct superior. However, unlike the other heads of the Five Great Clans, Hikaru is the closest to being a normal, good man, so both Toshiki and Tsunagi wish Mei luck in finding him a wife to make him happy. Elsewhere, a knife wielding assassin takes out Nagahiko the Spear Master and is sent his next list of Master's to kill, which includes Hikaru.
8	"The Hitman Hunter"; Transliteration: "Koroshiya Kari" (Japanese: 殺し屋狩り)	Satoshi Takafuji	Satoshi Takafuji	May 26, 2026
Arashiyama, who has a crush on Hikaru, asks him to protect her from Hitman Hunter. She reveals she is the Hamster Master, a subordinate of the Beast Clan, who works a normal job and does not kill people. The Beast Clan plans to use Arashiyama as bait for Hunter, so Hikaru agrees to bodyguard her. Arashiyama finds Hunter has killed Serpent, Owl, Hippo, Orca, Buffalo and Alligator. Hunter appears and stabs Hikaru, revealing he is an expert fighter with enhanced strength and reflexes. Hikaru suspects he is another Master, though Hunter insists he is a civilian who believes all assassins deserve death. Arashiyama insists Hikaru is a good man. Confused why one Master would protect another, Hunter introduces himself as Nakagawa, and his mission to wipe out the Beast Clan to prevent their plot to kill many people. Those from other clans he only killed because of particularly despicable crimes, such as Dismemberer, who killed elderly men for pleasure. Nakagawa desires to open a café with his girlfriend, but feels he can’t until the world is safer. Bat Master activates Arashiyama’s necklace, the Bonda Constrictor, that starts draining her blood. As this will take three days, Bat challenges them to come to Beast Clan island; Dogo Animal Kingdom.
9	"The Animal Kingdom"; Transliteration: "Dōbutsu Kingudamu" (Japanese: どうぶつ王国(キングダム))	Wazuka Komamiya	Wazuka Komamiya	June 2, 2026
Travelling to the island their boat is ambushed by a giant squid and Arashiyama carried away by an eagle. The man controlling the eagle, Koto Hanezawa, is not Eagle Master so Hikaru deduces he is from a branch family. Koto attacks with seagulls, but Hikaru distracts him with a smoke grenade then punches him senseless. Koto’s Bonda Constrictor hijacks his voice, and through him Hikaru speaks to Beast Master Toshiro Dogo. Toshiro is amused by Hikaru’s goal to find a wife but advises him to find someone with a stronger bloodline than Arashiyama. He reveals the Beast Clan’s plan; Cross-Sanguination, combining Master DNA to create whole new Masters. He activates Koto with the DNA of Spear Master to become Bird-Spear Master. Mei and Nakagawa land on the island and encounter a polar bear. Koto’s birds start collapsing, revealing they were drugged by Hikaru’s blood when they bit him. Koto suddenly dies, with Toshiro revealing Cross-Sanguination is usually rejected by the body, resulting in death. He also reveals his blood is the key to remove Arashiyama’s Bonda Constrictor. The polar bear snatches a leech from Nakagawa’s neck then flees, revealing she is Toshiro’s servant Byakko in a bear skin, and has just collected Nakagawa’s DNA. Toshiro recovers Hikaru’s blood from Koto’s seagulls and finds his Poison Clan DNA is the perfect catalyst for combining DNA.
10	"Good-for-Nothing"; Transliteration: "Yakudatazu" (Japanese: 役立たず)	Yūdai Ishikawa	Motonobu Hori & Daisuke Inoue	June 9, 2026
Arashiyama cooks her family's traditional meal; Anything Gruel. Hikaru eats it, despite his clan rule to never eat food cooked by someone else. Hikaru is distracted by an army of Koala Masters, allowing Toshiro to kidnap Arashiyama. Arashiyama awakes in a lab with captives from other branch families, and realises the rumours of the Beast Clan experimenting on its own subordinates are true. Hikaru double-doses on stimulants to battle Masters of 100 different animals, but when his defeat seems imminent, he considers a triple-dose, despite his instructors' warnings that even Poison Masters can overdose. He is suddenly saved by Shizuku the Water Master, hired by Mei to help Hikaru as repayment for the cream that manages her oxygen allergy. Hikaru creates a poison-water mist, knocking out their attackers. Shizuku blushes when Hikaru thanks her, with Mei revealing to Nakagawa she invited Shizuku as a surprise marriage candidate. Arashiyama recalls she fell in love with Hikaru when he was hired to assassinate organ traffickers who had just captured her. The memory stimulates her to rediscover her clan's lost ability to control rats. Via the thousands of wild rats on the island, she transmits her voice to the prisoners, urging them to escape and take revenge.
11	"Offering"; Transliteration: "Kumotsu" (Japanese: 供物)	Himari Tamagawa	Michiro Fukuda	June 16, 2026
Nakagawa and Mei make it to Toshiro and Nakagawa battles Byako in her polar bear form. Byako recalls her mother dying, ignored by the Beast Clan as their branch family could only take on animal abilities by wearing their skins, but could not partner with living animals. Toshiro took her in, promising Cross-Sanguination would revolutionise the Beast Clan. Toshiro completes his masterpiece; Franken-beast Hyakko, an animal skin for Byako made of 93 blood samples from branch families and 6 Masters including Hikaru and Nakagawa. Nakagawa's girlfriend Marin calls to invite him to a music concert. For interrupting their fight, Toshiro decides to kill Marin later. His anger lets Nakagawa focus all his analytical abilities, and severs Hyakko's right arm. By stabbing his own hand into the arm and squeezing the nerves, he forms a giant fist and punches a hole in Hyakko's chest. Toshiro absorbs Hyakko's blood into himself. Hikaru arrives with Shizuku. With Hyakko's DNA Toshiro transforms his right arm into a monster made of 93 animals and 6 Masters. The other prisoners refuse to listen to Arashiyama, too broken by the deaths of their animal partners, but she refuses to give up. Hikaru takes the dangerous triple-dose and passes out instantly. Toshiro tries to eat him, but Hikaru awakens at the height of his physical abilities.
12	"Heart and Soul"; Transliteration: "Shinzui" (Japanese: 心髄)	Yuka Hashimoto	Hideyuki Satake	June 23, 2026
Hikaru now has access to the Gero family ability Poison Blood, that is 100% lethal to all living things. Toshiro notes Hikaru still has no bloodlust and activates his final form; 100 Beast Stampede. Hikaru calmly dodges, revealing his bloodlust has been replaced by a desire for happiness. He unleashes his new blood; Radiant Burst which is so toxic Toshiro is forced to sever his arms to prevent the poison travelling to his heart. He reactivates Beast Stampede over his entire body, but Hikaru merely touches his skin and the poison ravages him. Desperate, Toshiro tries to kill Mei, Nakagawa and Shizuku to spite Hikaru. He suddenly stops moving as Arashiyama arrives with the other prisoners who finally decided to fight back, starting with taking back control of their animal's DNA in Toshiro's body. Hikaru extracts Toshiro's blood and removes everyone's Bonda Constrictors. A vampire bat lands on Toshiro, who recalls when he was 13 the Head of the Beast Clan partnered him with the bat as a sign Toshiro was unfit to be the next Head. Toshiro awakens, confused why he is still alive. Hikaru explains because he has no desire to kill, Radiant Burst was not fully lethal. Byakko tries to escape with Toshiro, but they are both caught by a giant wolf controlled by Toshiro's sister Tonako, newly elected Head of the Beast Clan.
13	"Thanks, Man"; Transliteration: "Senkyu na" (Japanese: センキュな)	Yuujirou Moriyama	Kanchi Miyata	June 30, 2026
Tonako sinisterly suggests she might accept Hikaru as her husband in the future. Meanwhile, Arashiyama, the freed prisoners, and their animals celebrate Hikaru. Noticing a moment between Hikaru and Arashiyama, Mei steers the topic to romance by asking Nakagawa about Marin. Mei then warns Hikaru that Arashiyama’s idolization of him will fade if he disappoints her, urging him to get her number quickly. Hikaru freezes from stress, prompting Arashiyama to confess instead. However, she explains she cannot be a wife candidate yet because her personal life is a mess; marrying him now would only cause him difficulty. She vows to become a better person first. Hikaru promises to wait and asks for her number, leaving Mei satisfied. Shizuku departs after reminding Hikaru to pay her fee, while Nakagawa returns to Marin, who is pleased he made friends. Arashiyama decides to open her own detective agency to find her missing older brother. Elsewhere, Teruaki, a member of a Poison Clan branch family, takes an interest in Hikaru's marriage progress. Mei brings Hikaru along on her side job as a romantic counsellor. Though the clients' problems stress him out, Mei explains he needs to see others trying their hardest. Hikaru admits working with Mei is fun. Later, Hikaru meets his sister Akari, who warns him Teruaki might be targeting Mei.

== Reception ==
Marriagetoxin was nominated for the Next Manga Award in the Best Web Manga category in June 2022, and ranked eighth out of 50 nominees. It also ranked fifth in the Nationwide Publishers Recommended Comics of 2023. The series was recommended by Koyoharu Gotouge, Gege Akutami and Mogumo, the character designer for the anime series Mobile Suit Gundam: The Witch from Mercury.

The first volume received positive reviews for its art and action sequences. Hikaru Gero has been singled out as a "[v]ery relatable lead" with praise aimed at his design and his relationship with the "bubbly and energetic" Mei Kinosaki. Some criticism was aimed at Kinosaki's supporting role in the story rather than being a "fully realized character."

In Anime News Network's year-end retrospective, Lucas DeRuyter wrote that: "Marriagetoxin's attitude towards dating is so healthy, and it was considered a shoo-in for my pick for the best new manga of the year."
