= Losing Control (disambiguation) =

Losing Control is a 2011 American romantic comedy film.

Losing Control may refer to:

== Film and TV ==
- Losing Control, 1998 erotic film with Kira Reed
- Losing Control (TV series), Nigerian TV series
- "Losing Control" (Doctors), a 2002 TV episode

== Music ==
- Losing Control, album by Barney Bentall and the Legendary Hearts 1982
- "Losing Control", song by Amii Stewart from Try Love
- "Losing Control", song by Audio Adrenaline from Until My Heart Caves In, 2005
- "Losing Control", song by Boy George from U Can Never B2 Straight 2002
- "Losing Control", song by Ak'Sent
- "Losing Control", song by Escape the Fate from Ungrateful
- "Losing Control", song by Broken Bones
- "Loosen' Control", song by Snoop Dogg 2001
- "Losin Control", song by American rapper Russ 2015

== See also ==
- Lose Control (disambiguation)
- Lost Control (disambiguation)
