= Lost Control =

Lost Control may refer to:

- "Lost Control" (Grinspoon song), 2002
- "Lost Control" (Alan Walker song), 2018
- Lost Control, an album by Capture
- "Lost Control", B-side of "The More You Live, the More You Love", a song by A Flock of Seagulls

== See also ==
- Lose Control (disambiguation)
- Losing Control (disambiguation)
