= Tube Time =

Television programming block

Tube Time was a programming block on Comcast Digital Cable's On Demand service which featured free episodes of many classic television series owned by Sony Pictures Television.

On December 31, 2009, Tube Time was discontinued by Comcast, in preparation for the rebranding to Xfinity.

== Programs Offered on Tube Time ==
- Barney Miller
- Bewitched
- Carson's Comedy Classics
- Charlie's Angels
- Diff'rent Strokes
- The Facts of Life
- Fantasy Island
- Gidget
- I Dream of Jeannie
- The Larry Sanders Show
- Maude
- The Monkees
- Ned and Stacey
- One Day at a Time
- The Partridge Family
- Party of Five
- Sanford and Son
- Silver Spoons
- Soap
- Square Pegs
- Starsky & Hutch
- S.W.A.T.
- The Three Stooges
- What's Happening!!
- Who's the Boss?
