= Lose Control (TV programming block) =

Lose Control was an Indian television programming block, which aired over four hours daily on Disney Channel India.

The program features a competition in which viewers must guess which series a featured clip is from. Weekly winners are awarded a Disney-branded scooter, and have the chance to win a trip to Hong Kong Disneyland.

== Shows ==
- Recess
- Akkad Bakkad Bambey Bo
- Art Attack
- Dhoom Machaao Dhoom
- Hanuman
- Hannah Montana
- Vicky & Vetaal
