= Thea Flaum =

American television producer

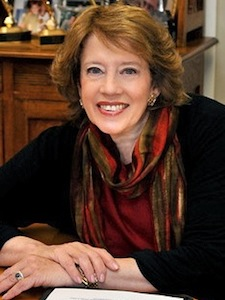
- Born: Thea Kharasch; September 17, 1938 (age 87); Chicago, Illinois, U.S.
- Education: Skidmore College
- Occupation: American television producer
- Known for: Creator of Sneak Previews (1975-1996)
- Spouse(s): Joel Flaum (divorced) Robert A. Hill
- Children: 4

Thea Flaum (born Thea Kharasch; September 17, 1938) is an American television producer best known as the creator of Sneak Previews, the movie review show featuring Roger Ebert and Gene Siskel. She is the president of the Hill Foundation for Families Living with Disabilities, a nonprofit organization founded by Flaum and her husband, Robert A. Hill.

== Early life ==
Flaum was born in Chicago, Illinois. She is the daughter of Sam and Freda Kharasch, and grew up in Chicago. She attended Skidmore College, where she was editor-in-chief of The Skidmore News and graduated in 1960 with a bachelor's degree in English literature.

== Career ==
=== Television career ===
In 1975, Flaum created a television show called Opening Soon at a Theater Near You — which later became well known as Sneak Previews and Sneak Previews Goes Video.

A few years later, Flaum was named Executive Producer for National (PBS) cultural programs for WTTW in Chicago. She created the first national parenting series, “Look at Me,” hosted by Phil Donahue. She was responsible for the Soundstage music series and for co-productions with MTV and HBO.

In 1984, Flaum formed an independent production company based in Chicago. The company focused on family programming—creating, developing and producing dramas, documentaries, specials, series and pilots, for network, cable, syndication and public television.

Productions include: At the Auction, The Appraisal Fair and CityScapes for the Home and Garden Television Network (HGTV,) From Junky to Funky for DIY and De-Classified, for Tribune Broadcasting. Also Love Hurts, a drama for ABC's AfterSchool Specials series, Christmas Every Day and The Canterville Ghost, two animated children's specials for CBS and Where’s Daddy? for NBC. PBS shows include a record-setting series of seven Les Brown specials; Ruth Page's Die Fledermaus ballet, and Ruth Page: Once Upon A Dancer, a biographical portrait of the American dance pioneer and choreographer.

She also served as a national vice-president of the National Academy of Television Arts and Sciences.

=== Hill Foundation for Families Living with Disabilities ===
Flaum is president of the Hill Foundation for Families Living with Disabilities, which was established in 2007 by Flaum and her husband, Robert A. Hill.

The foundation has created FacingDisability.com, a web resource specifically created to connect families who suddenly have to deal with a spinal cord injury with people like them.

=== Community service ===
Flaum currently serves as a member of the Boards of Trustees of Access Living, the Chicago Television Academy, the Ruth Page Foundation, the Fund for Innovative Television and the Governing Board of the Chicago Symphony.

== Personal life ==
Flaum was married to United States circuit judge Joel Flaum, whom she later divorced. Flaum is currently married to Chicago businessman, Robert A. Hill, the founder and chairman of Floor Covering Associates. They have four children, Jonathan and Alison Flaum and Vicki and Miranda Hill.

== Filmography ==
Year	Title	Role	Notes
1988	Ruth Page: Once Upon A Dancer	Herself	
1989	The Siskel & Ebert 500th Anniversary Special	Sneak Previews Producer	
1999; 2013	Chicago Tonight	Herself	2 episodes
1999	At the Movies	Herself	Episode: "Remembering Gene Siskel"
2014	Life Itself	Herself	

== Awards ==
Flaum has won nine Emmy Awards, 10 international film awards, the American Bar Association's “Silver Gavel” award, the “Best in Media” award from the National Council for Children's Rights, a Cine “Golden Eagle,” and a “Golden Apple.” In 1993, she was named Chicago's “Best Producer” by “Screen” Magazine. In 1996, she received the Governor's Award from the Chicago Academy of Television Arts and Sciences. In 2001, she received their Silver Circle Award for her “significant contributions to broadcasting”. She was given the Focus Achievement Award from Women in Film Chicago in 2006.
