= Cartoon Quest =

Television programming block

- Logo used from 1992-1995
- Network: The Sci Fi Channel
- Launched: 1992; 33 years ago
- Closed: 1995; 30 years ago
- Country of origin: United States

Cartoon Quest was a block of mostly animated television shows that aired on the Sci Fi Channel starting in 1992. Similar to USA's Cartoon Express, it featured reruns of various older cartoons interspersed with interstitial segments; in this case, focusing on a live-action family (all clad in loincloths) exploring a strange region. During its run, the block aired every Saturday from 7:00 AM to 11:00 AM EST.

This block ended in 1995, and was replaced by The Animation Station.

== Programming ==
Shows aired the first season of Cartoon Quest are:

- Captain Scarlet and the Mysterons
- Defenders of the Earth
- Fantastic Voyage
- The New Adventures of Flash Gordon
- Return to the Planet of the Apes
- Star Trek: The Animated Series
- Stingray
- The Transformers

The following year and further on:

- Back to the Future: The Animated Series
- Bionic Six
- The Funny Company
- Galaxy High
- Here Comes the Grump
- Journey to the Center of the Earth
- Land of the Lost
- Lazer Patrol
- Little Shop
- The New Adventures of Gigantor
- Robotech
- Ronin Warriors
- Star Wars: Droids
- Star Wars: Ewoks
- Terrahawks

== See also ==
- The Animation Station
- S.C.I.F.I. World
