= S.C.I.F.I. World =

American TV channel program block (2000–2001)

S.C.I.F.I. World was a daytime programming schedule for the Sci Fi Channel that started on July 17, 2000 and ended on December 21, 2001. It aired reruns of science fiction series blocked in mini-marathons through the week.

== Format ==
Divided into five different segments in accordance with the days of the week, each day centred on a particular science fiction theme, which the marathons followed, airing from 10 AM to 4 PM. These themes were named in such a way that, when assembled, they formed an acronym matching the SCI FI of the channel's name.

- Superhero Land, which, on Mondays focused on superheroes featuring marathons of such shows as Batman, The Bionic Woman, Wonder Woman, and The Incredible Hulk. The first marathon aired thereon was The Six Million Dollar Man.
- Creature Land, which, on Tuesdays focused primarily on monsters, otherworldly, nonhumanoid or otherwise, that included marathons of such shows as Land of the Giants, Hercules: The Legendary Journeys, Earth 2, and SeaQuest DSV. The first marathon aired thereon was of The Incredible Hulk.
- Intergalactic Land, which centred attention towards space-driven shows as Space: Above and Beyond, Star Trek, and Lost in Space. The first marathon aired thereon was of the original Battlestar Galactica. These shows were seen on Wednesdays.
- Fantastic Land, which deviated from the usual science-fiction focus unto more fantasy-based shows like Night Gallery, Otherworld, and Darkroom. The first marathon aired thereon was of Quantum Leap. These shows could be seen on Thursdays.
- Inhuman Land, akin to Creatureland's theme, every Friday focused on monsters but more along the lines of a conspiratorial scope and concerned the humanoid kind as was depicted in an animation of Carl Kolchak trying to evade a werewolf in the shadowy alleys of Inhumanland. Shows aired included Dark Skies, Alien Nation, and Something is Out There. The first marathon aired thereon was of Manimal.

To reinforce this novelty, the programming schedule was advertised by way of animations depicting it as a theme-park which various science-fiction characters such as James T. Kirk, Duncan MacLeod, and RoboCop inhabited. Aside from this, graphic teasers, trivia, and on-air questions were aired to amuse and inform the viewer and promote the SciFi.com website.

== List of S.C.I.F.I. World shows ==
=== Superhero Land Mondays ===
Shows	First Airing
Automan	August 7, 2000
Batman	January 29, 2001
The Bionic Woman	July 24, 2000
Black Scorpion	October 1, 2001
The Crow: Stairway to Heaven	March 12, 2001
Hercules: The Legendary Journeys	October 30, 2000
Highlander: The Raven	October 15, 2001
The Incredible Hulk	August 28, 2000
RoboCop: The Series	August 14, 2000
The Sentinel	February 12, 2001
The Six Million Dollar Man	July 17, 2000
Wonder Woman	July 31, 2000
Xena: Warrior Princess	September 18, 2000

=== Creature Land Tuesdays ===
Shows	First Airing
Alien Nation	November 14, 2000
Brimstone	May 22, 2001
Earth 2	August 1, 2000
Friday the 13th: The Series	January 30, 2001
G vs E	October 9, 2001
Hercules: The Legendary Journeys	August 15, 2000
The Incredible Hulk	July 18, 2000
Kolchak: The Night Stalker	September 26, 2000
Land of the Giants	August 8, 2000
Manimal	August 29, 2000
SeaQuest DSV	July 25, 2000
The Six Million Dollar Man	October 24, 2000
Sliders	January 9, 2001
Star Trek	August 22, 2000
Swamp Thing	December 12, 2000

=== Intergalactic Land Wednesdays ===
Shows	First Airing
Battlestar Galactica	July 19, 2000
Dark Skies	October 3, 2001
Lost in Space	August 2, 2000
The Ray Bradbury Theater	August 16, 2000
Quantum Leap	September 12, 2001
Space: Above and Beyond	August 9, 2000
Star Trek	July 26, 2000
The Twilight Zone	December 13, 2000
Wonder Woman	October 25, 2000

=== Fantastic Land Thursdays ===
Shows	First Airing
Beyond Reality	November 2, 2000
Black Scorpion	November 8, 2001
Darkroom	August 31, 2000
Fantasy Island	January 25, 2001
Friday the 13th: The Series	August 30, 2001
Highlander: The Raven	February 1, 2001
Highlander: The Series	August 3, 2000
Night Gallery	August 17, 2000
Otherworld	September 21, 2000
Probe	August 24, 2000
Quantum Leap	July 20, 2000
SeaQuest DSV	September 14, 2000
Sliders	September 28, 2000
The Twilight Zone	July 27, 2000
Viper	February 8, 2001

=== Inhuman Land Fridays ===
Shows	First Airing
Alien Nation	July 28, 2000
Brimstone	January 19, 2001
Dark Skies	August 18, 2000
Friday the 13th: The Series	April 13, 2001
Gemini Man	August 4, 2000
G vs E	November 30, 2001
The Invisible Man	September 8, 2000
Kolchak: The Night Stalker	August 25, 2000
Manimal	July 21, 2000
Prey	February 9, 2001
SeaQuest DSV	October 6, 2000
Swamp Thing	August 11, 2000
The Visitor	September 15, 2000

== Reception and influence ==
Despite criticisms made by viewers in favour of reverting to a more varied programming schedule, this format of airing marathons five times a week continued for many years, although S.C.I.F.I. World was no longer used as a title.

== See also ==
- Cartoon Quest
- The Animation Station
