= Nickel-O-Zone =

- Genre: Programming block
- Country of origin: United States
- Original language: English

Production
- Running time: 60 minutes

Original release
- Network: Nickelodeon
- Release: August 31, 1998 – 2000

Nickel-O-Zone was a one-hour programming block on the American cable television network Nickelodeon, geared toward older (preteen to teen) audiences, that ran from August 31, 1998 – 2000. It was aired on Sunday-Friday 8p and ended at 9p. ET.

== Programming ==
This is a list of all programming on Nickel-O-Zone and their time slots that were aired around August 31, 1998 - 2000.

=== 1998-1999 ===
Sundays

- 8 p.m. The Mystery Files of Shelby Woo
- 8:30 p.m. Nick News

Mondays

- 8 p.m. Hey Arnold!
- 8:30 p.m. The Journey of Allen Strange

Tuesdays

- 8 p.m. The Wild Thornberrys
- 8:30 p.m. Cousin Skeeter

Wednesdays

- 8 p.m. Hey Arnold!
- 8:30 p.m. The Journey of Allen Strange

Thursdays

- 8 p.m. The Wild Thornberrys
- 8:30 p.m. Cousin Skeeter

Fridays

- 8 p.m. KaBlam!
- 8:30 p.m. Animorphs

=== Early to Spring 1999 ===
Sundays

- 8 p.m. Animorphs
- 8:30 p.m. Nick News

Mondays

- 8 p.m. Hey Arnold!
- 8:30 p.m. CatDog

Tuesdays

- 8 p.m. The Wild Thornberrys
- 8:30 p.m. CatDog

Wednesdays

- 8 p.m. Hey Arnold!
- 8:30 p.m. CatDog

Thursdays

- 8 p.m. The Wild Thornberrys
- 8:30 p.m. CatDog

Fridays

- 8 p.m. KaBlam!
- 8:30 p.m. CatDog

=== Spring to Summer 1999 ===
Sundays

- 8 p.m. Animorphs
- 8:30 p.m. Nick News

Mondays

- 8 p.m. Hey Arnold!
- 8:30 p.m. Hey Arnold!

Tuesdays

- 8 p.m. The Wild Thornberrys
- 8:30 p.m. The Wild Thornberrys

Wednesdays

- 8 p.m. Hey Arnold!
- 8:30 p.m. Hey Arnold!

Thursdays

- 8 p.m. The Wild Thornberrys
- 8:30 p.m. The Wild Thornberrys

Fridays

- 8 p.m. Cousin Skeeter
- 8:30 p.m. Cousin Skeeter

=== Summer 1999 ===
Sundays

- 8 p.m. Animorphs
- 8:30 p.m. Nick News

Mondays

- 8 p.m. Hey Arnold!
- 8:30 p.m. CatDog

Tuesdays

- 8 p.m. The Wild Thornberrys
- 8:30 p.m. Cousin Skeeter

Wednesdays

- 8 p.m. Hey Arnold!
- 8:30 p.m. The Journey of Allen Strange

Thursdays

- 8 p.m. The Wild Thornberrys
- 8:30 p.m. Cousin Skeeter

Fridays

- 8 p.m. KaBlam!
- 8:30 p.m. Oh Yeah! Cartoons

=== Summer to Fall 1999 ===
Sundays

- 8 p.m. Animorphs
- 8:30 p.m. Nick News

Mondays

- 8 p.m. The Wild Thornberrys
- 8:30 p.m. Rocket Power

Tuesdays

- 8 p.m. The Wild Thornberrys
- 8:30 p.m. Cousin Skeeter

Wednesdays

- 8 p.m. The Wild Thornberrys
- 8:30 p.m. Rocket Power

Thursdays

- 8 p.m. The Wild Thornberrys
- 8:30 p.m. Cousin Skeeter

Fridays

- 8 p.m. SpongeBob SquarePants
- 8:30 p.m. CatDog

=== Smell-O-Vision ===
Mondays

- 8 p.m. The Wild Thornberrys: Show Me the Bunny
- 8:30 p.m. Rocket Power: D" is for Dad / Banned on the Run

Tuesdays

- 8 p.m. The Wild Thornberrys: Reef Grief
- 8:30 p.m. Cousin Skeeter: N/A

Wednesdays

- 8 p.m. The Wild Thornberrys: Thornberry Island
- 8:30 p.m. Rocket Power: Super McVarial 900 / Loss of Squid

Thursdays

- 8 p.m. The Wild Thornberrys: Clash of the Teutons
- 8:30 p.m. Cousin Skeeter: Unchained

Fridays

- 8 p.m. SpongeBob SquarePants: Sandy's Rocket / Squeaky Boots (Premiere)
- 8:30 p.m. CatDog : Send In The CatDog / Fishing for Trouble / Fetch

=== Nickel-AAAHH!!-Zone ===
Mondays

- 8 p.m. The Wild Thornberrys: Blood Sisters
- 8:30 p.m. Rocket Power: Fall and Rise of Sam / Typhoid Sam

Tuesdays

- 8 p.m. CatDog: CatDogula
- 8:30 p.m. 100 Deeds for Eddie McDowd: All Howls Eve

Wednesdays

- 8 p.m. Hey Arnold!: Arnold's Halloween
- 8:30 p.m. Kenan & Kel: Oh, Brother

Thursdays

- 8 p.m. SpongeBob SquarePants: Scaredy Pants / I Was a Teenage Gary
- 8:30 p.m. Cousin Skeeter
