= List of animated programming blocks =

The following is a list of current and former programming blocks airing animated television programs.

== Current ==
=== United States ===
Block title	Network	Launch date	Source(s)
Nick at Nite	Nickelodeon	July 1, 1985	
PBS Kids	PBS	September 6, 1999	
Adult Swim	Cartoon Network	September 2, 2001	
Marvel Universe	Disney XD	April 1, 2012	
Toonami	Adult Swim	May 26, 2012	
PBS Kids Family Night	PBS Kids	April 21, 2017	
Checkered Past	Adult Swim	August 28, 2023	

=== Canada ===
- Animation Rules
- CBC Kids
- Teletoon at Night
- The Zone
- The Zone Weekend

=== Australia ===
- Animation Domination
- Animation Fixation
- Animation Salvation
- Adult Swim

=== United Kingdom ===
- Adult Swim

=== Japan ===
- Agaru Anime
- Animazing!!!
- Animeism/Super Animeism TURBO
- Friday Anime Night
- Ka-Anival!!
- Nichi-5
- Noitamina
- NUMAnimation
- IMAnimation/IMAnimation W
- +Ultra

=== Ireland ===
- Adult Swim

=== Spain ===
- Boing

== Former ==
=== United States ===
Block title	Network	Launch date	End date	Sources
The Funtastic World of Hanna-Barbera	Syndication	September 15, 1985	1994	
Fox Kids	Fox	September 8, 1990	September 7, 2002	
The Disney Afternoon	Syndication	September 10, 1990	August 29, 1997	
Bohbot Kids Network	Syndication	September 13, 1992	2000	
PTV	PBS	July 11, 1994	September 5, 1999	
Kids' WB!	The WB/The CW	September 9, 1995	May 17, 2008	
UPN Kids	UPN	September 10, 1995	September 5, 1999	
Disney's One Saturday Morning	ABC	September 13, 1997	September 7, 2002	
Disney's One Too	UPN	September 6, 1999	August 31, 2003	
Nick on CBS	CBS	September 16, 2000	September 9, 2006	
ABC Kids	ABC	September 14, 2002	August 27, 2011	
4Kids TV	Fox	September 14, 2002	December 27, 2008	
PBS Kids Go!	PBS	October 11, 2004	October 7, 2013	
PBS Kids Preschool Block	PBS	September 4, 2006	October 7, 2013	
Qubo	NBC/Telemundo	September 9, 2006	June 30, 2012	
Cookie Jar TV	CBS	September 16, 2006	September 21, 2013	
The CW4Kids	The CW	May 24, 2008	August 18, 2012	
NBC Kids	NBC	July 7, 2012	September 25, 2016	
Vortexx	The CW	August 25, 2012	September 27, 2014	
KidsClick	This TV/TBD/Syndication	July 1, 2017	March 31, 2019	
Animation Contamination	Comedy Central	March 23, 2020	2021	
TZGZ	Syfy	April 19, 2019	March 13, 2021	
Animation Situation/TBS 2D	TBS	April 19, 2021	September 13, 2021	
ACME Night	Adult Swim	September 19, 2021	December 29, 2024	
Toonami Rewind	Adult Swim	May 31, 2024	December 27, 2024	
Cartoonito	Cartoon Network	September 13, 2021	May 23, 2025	
