= Kansai Television =

Television station in Osaka, Japan

Coordinates: 34°42′17.05″N 135°30′37.37″E

JODX-DTV
- Logo used since 2015

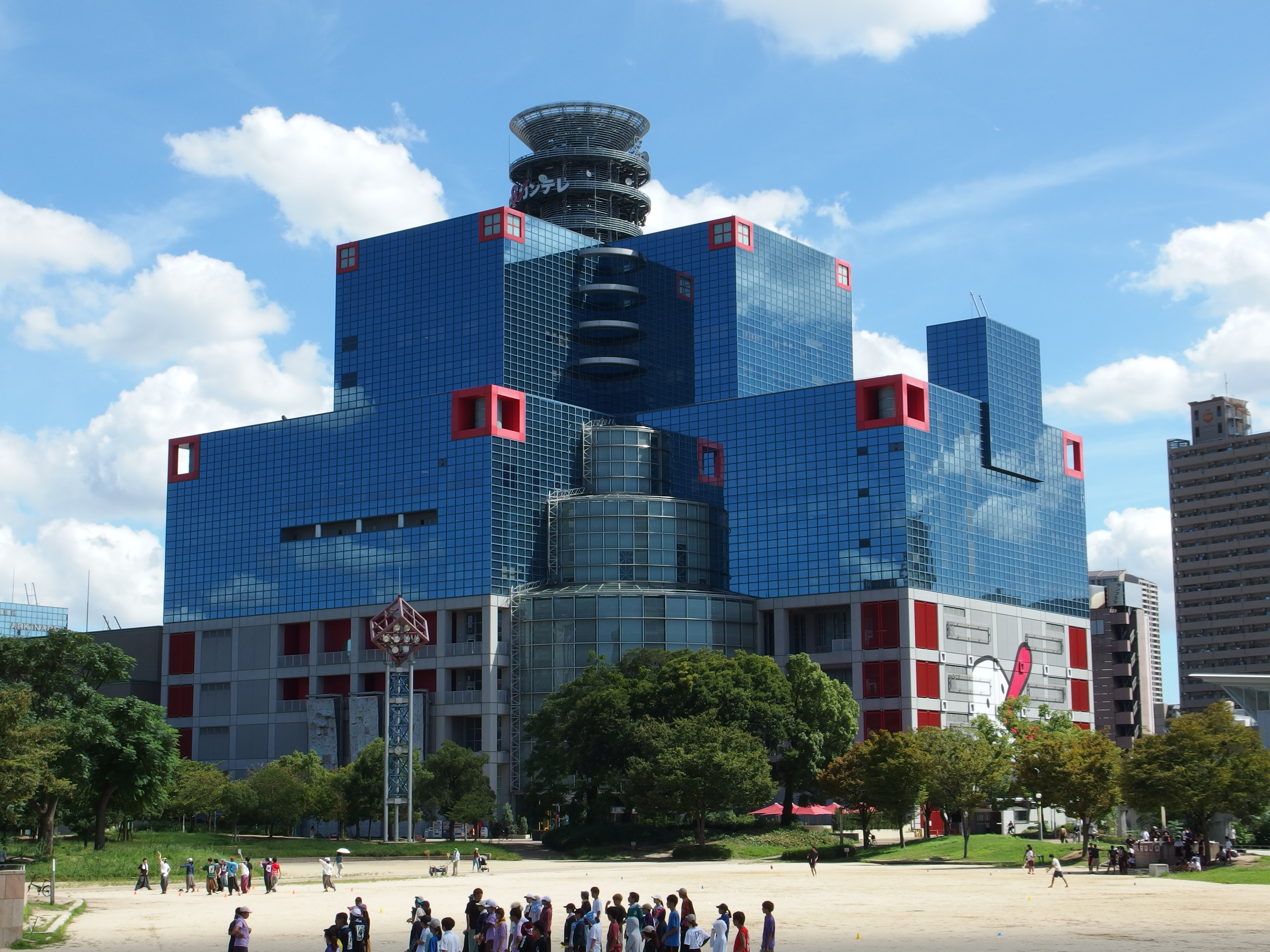
- Headquarters in Kita-ku, Osaka
- Kansai region; Japan
- City: Osaka
- Channels: Digital: 17 (UHF); Virtual: 8
- Branding: Kansai TV

Programming
- Language: Japanese
- Affiliations: Fuji News Network and Fuji Network System

Ownership
- Owner: Kansai Television Co. Ltd.

History
- First air date: November 22, 1958; 67 years ago
- Former call signs: JODX-TV (1958–2011)
- Former channel numbers: Analog: 8 (VHF, 1958–2011)

Technical information
- Licensing authority: MIC
- ERP: 29 kW

Links
- Website: www.ktv.jp

Corporate information
- Company
- Native name: 関西テレビ放送株式会社
- Romanized name: Kansai Terebi Hōsō kabushiki gaisha
- Formerly: Dai Kansai TV Company (1957); Kansai Telecasting Corporation (1958-2018)
- Type: Private KK
- Industry: Media
- Founded: February 1, 1957; 69 years ago
- Headquarters: 1-7, Ogimachi Nichome, Kita-ku, Osaka, Japan
- Area served: Worldwide
- Key people: Sumio Fukui (president and CEO)
- Services: Television broadcasting
- Revenue: ¥66,105 million (2012); ¥66,091 million (2011)
- Operating income: ▲¥4,301 million (2012); ¥4,055 million (2011)
- Net income: ▼¥2,078 million; ¥2,382 million (2011)
- Total assets: ▲¥115,051 million (2012); ¥112,421 million (2011)
- Total equity: ▲¥84,535 million (2012); ¥79,132 million (2011)
- Owner: Fuji Media Holdings (24.9%); Hankyu Hanshin Holdings (19.2%)
- Number of employees: 559 (June 2024)
- Subsidiaries: KTVLIFE Corporation; Media Pulpo Co., Ltd.; Kansai TV Hazz Corporation; KTV Software Inc.; Lemon Studio Corporation; WEST ONE inc.; Central Television, inc.

JODX-DTV (channel 8), branded as Kansai TV (Japanese: 関西テレビ, Hepburn: Kansai-terebi; KTV, also spelled as Kantele (カンテレ)), is the Kansai region key station of the Fuji News Network (FNN) and Fuji Network System (FNS), owned-and-operated by the Kansai Television Co. Ltd. (Japanese: 関西テレビ放送株式会社, Hepburn: Kansai Terebi Hōsō kabushiki gaisha). Its studios and headquarters are located in Osaka and the broadcaster is an affiliate company of the Hankyu Hanshin Holdings Group, part of the wider Hankyu Hanshin Toho Group.

== History ==
=== Establishing the plans for first channels ===
In 1952, when the Ministry of Posts announced the first channel plan for Tokyo, Osaka, and Nagoya, "TV Osaka" (テレビ大阪, unrelated to the current Television Osaka) initiated by the Sankei Shimbun, as well as Kyoto Broadcasting System and Kobe Broadcasting, applied for a TV license in the Osaka area. However, the TV license in the Osaka area was later obtained by Osaka TV Broadcasting, a joint operation of Asahi Broadcasting and New Japan Broadcasting (now Mainichi Broadcasting System). Afterwards, when the Ministry of Posts and Telecommunications released a new channel frequency plan again, the Sankei Shimbun and Hankyu Electric Railway applied for a TV license in the name of "Kansai TV Broadcasting" (Japanese: 関西テレビ放送) to apply for a TV license in its name. The two were integrated into "Dai Kansai TV Broadcasting" (大関西テレビ放送) in June 1957, and obtained a TV license on July 8 of the same year. On February 1, 1958, the Great Kansai TV Broadcasting Formally established, and changed the company name to "Kansai Telecasting Corporation" in July of the same year. With the completion of the signal launch station in September 1958 and the completion of the headquarters building in October, the conditions for KTV to start broadcasting were ripe.

=== 1958: KTV starts broadcasts ===
Logo used from 1958 to 1964.

At 16:30 on November 22, 1958, Kansai Telecasting officially started broadcasting. The first program broadcast was "This is Commercial" (これがコマーシャルだ) which lasted for one and a half hours, introducing the general situation of KTV and the information from East and West House. The History of Advertising From Beginning to Broadcast TV Advertising. On the evening of the first day of the broadcast, the commemorative performance held at the Umeda Theater, as well as movies and news programs were broadcast. At the beginning of the broadcast, since Kansai TV did not join any network, 95% of KTV's programs were self-made except for news. It was not until Tokai Television in December of the same year and Fuji Television and Kyushu Asahi Broadcasting's television division in March of the following year that KTV had the support of a network, and was able to reduce the number of self-produced programs to save costs, and the proportion of self-produced programs was also reduced to about 40%. KTV also participated in the 1959 broadcast of the wedding of the crown prince (the current emperor) Akihito and Michiko Masada. This wedding also became a major opportunity for the popularization of television in Japanese households[8]:14. KTV also achieved the first program broadcast from the seabed in the Japanese private TV industry in this year, and won the People's Congress Award for this. were broadcast. At the beginning of the broadcast, since KTV did not join any network, 95% of KTV's programs were self-made except for news.

=== 1960-2002: Growth, network formation and headquarters move ===
Logo used from 1964 to 2015.

Because Hankyu Electric Railway was one of the main shareholders of KTV, the Hosei Opera became an important program resource of the channel in its early days. In 1961, the average audience rating of Kansai Telecasting during the prime time reached 16.3%, and it was the first time it was rated first place in the Kansai area. With the rapid development of Japan's economy, TV advertising expenses also increased rapidly, and Kansai TV's advertising revenue also increased rapidly. In 1959, Kansai Television Station turned losses into profits the following year, and in 1967, it achieved zero debts. In October 1968, it was the first to rank first in the operating income of Osaka's four private four stations. The program production capacity of Kansai TV Station also improved simultaneously during this period. The finale of the TV series "Udon" (うどん) aired in 1967 set a record of 49.3% ratings, which is the only broadcast on Kansai TV to achieve the record for highest ratings so far except for sports events. In September 1964, KTV broadcast its first color program "Thunderbolt Boat", and broadcast its first color production in 1967. In 1969, Kansai TV realized 60% of the prime-time programs in color, and in November of the following year, all the prime-time programs were in color. KTV sent 30 people to participate in the 1964 Tokyo Olympics interview activities, and used color TV to broadcast some events.

In 1969, the Fuji Network System (FNS) was formally established, and KTV was one of the four permanent directors (The other three were Fuji TV, Tokai Television, and Television Nishinippon), which have an important position in the network. KTV was also the first TV station in Japan to start using computers for business affairs among private TV stations in Japan. It began to use computers for salary calculation and other businesses in 1962. In 1978, KTV celebrated its 20th anniversary. During this period, KTV made new achievements in the fields of technology and international communication. In 1979, KTV began broadcasting stereo programs. In 1978 and 1981, KTV also invited two former US presidents, Gerald Ford and Jimmy Carter, to visit Japan.

After the 1980s, as the ratings of Fuji TV ushered in a leap forward, KTV also entered a peak ratings. In 1983, the station won the ratings championship for the first time in the evening prime time (19:00 to 22:00) and 19:00 to 23:00. In 1985, the station further won the triple crown of ratings in the prime time, evening time, and full-day three-time period, and maintained these records until 1994. KTV's advertising revenue has also increased significantly with the increase in ratings. In 1985, the operating income of Kansai TV reached 36.9 billion yen, achieving an average daily turnover of more than 100 million yen. Kansai TV is also actively exploring new areas other than television. In 1986, it produced its first film "The Capital Disappears". In 1988, on the occasion of the 30th anniversary of its launch, Kansai TV produced and broadcast special programs such as "Ancient Capital" and "A Journey to Central Asia".

In 1991, at the peak of Japan's bubble economy period, KTV set a record of 61.7 billion yen in operating income and 9.8 billion yen in regular interests.

Under the background of excellent performance, insufficient space in the existing headquarters, and the successive relocation of Yomiuri TV and MBS to new headquarters, KTV also released a plan to build a new headquarters in 1994. Due to the lack of a suitable large-scale open space in Osaka City, Kansai TV decided to obtain the new headquarters construction land in the form of land trust by participating in the Ogimachi Park redevelopment plan of the Osaka City Government. In 1991, Kansai Telecasting also set up a studio in Tokyo, so that artists could record KTV's programs in Tokyo and improve program production capabilities.

In 1995, the station only won one prime time championship in the triple crown of ratings, and the triple crown record stopped for 10 years. Since 1996, YTV replaced Kansai TV in winning the triple crown in ratings year after year. This situation is exactly the same as that of Nippon Television in Kanto, which shows that the ratings competition in the Kansai area has changed from the competition among the stations. The competition evolved into a competition among network networks. In addition, KTV opened its official website on November 22, 1995, the first Japanese television station to do so.

In March 1997, KTV's new headquarters in Ogimachi was completed. Beginning in April of that year, various departments of KTV began to move into the new headquarters one after another, and officially launched signals from the new headquarters on September 29. In response to the multi-channel era, KTV launched the satellite TV channel KTV Kyoto Channel in 1998, which specializes in broadcasting programs related to the history and culture of Kyoto. In 2003, Kansai TV began broadcasting digital TV signals. By 2007, Kansai TV's digital signal had covered 91.1% of the households within the broadcast range.

In April 2001, KTV carried out a major program adaptation of 37% of the whole day, 57.3% of the evening time, and 62.7% of the prime time, intending to win the triple crown of ratings.

=== 2003-2011: 45th anniversary and digital television ===
In 2003, Kansai TV celebrated its 45th anniversary. This year, under the background of Fuji TV's ratings recovery, KTV won the triple crown of ratings again after 10 years. Kansai TV also held a series of celebrations for the 45th anniversary of broadcasting in 2003, including inviting the Trieste Opera Troupe from Italy to perform in Japan. In 2007, Kansai TV was exposed to " Discover! Encyclopedia of Real Things II was falsified, the reputation and image of the media were seriously damaged, and it was once expelled from the Japanese Private Broadcasting Union.

In 2008, Kansai Television rejoined the Japan Private Broadcasting Union. During this period, due to the economic depression in Japan, Kansai TV Station also fell into operational difficulties. In the first half of 2008, Kansai TV recorded a deficit financial report for the first time since its broadcast In this severe situation, KTV decided to close the Kyoto Channel and concentrate its operating resources on its terrestrial television division.

With the nationwide suspension of analog TV signals on July 24, 2011, KTV shut down its analog signal. In March 2015, Kansai TV ended its 51-year-old long-running abstract KTV-wordmark logo alongside its 8-symbol which ends their usage for the first time of 51 years since 1964, and by that, the station unifies its appellation as "Kantele (カンテレ)" as it adopts a new logo which consists of a purple 8 on a purple shadow and it is beside to the grey Kantale, so for now, its new logo will be stylized as "8 kantele (8 カンテレ)".

=== 2024-present: Scandal and later developments ===
As an affiliate station of the Fuji Network System, Kansai TV was also affected by the Masahiro Nakai sexual abuse scandal reported by Josei Seven and Bunshun in December 2024. After the press conference held by Fuji TV President Koichi Minato on January 17, president Toru Ota revealed that more than 30 companies' ads had been replaced by AC Japan ads. At the beginning, Ota had said that Kansai TV had nothing to do with the case, and urged for Fuji TV to investigate thoroughly, but after Ota's name was mentioned as one of the people who knew about the details revealed by the female victim, he responded to the questions in the January 22, 2025 press conference saying he received the information in limited circumstances, and, in light of the situation, shared the information with President Minato. Minato's response was to put her mind and health first. Kansai TV held this regular press conference, with the difference that it was in an open format, instead of the normal Press Club-only version. 48 people from 27 companies attended.

On March 21, 2025, Kansai TV reported the results of an employee survey on possible sexual harassment or abuse. From February 7 to 21, 533 out of 613 employees responded the survey. It was determined that some of them had indeed suffered some kind of sexual harassment or abuse, but none required immediate attention. Regarding the cases in which a declaration was made, the report said, "In order to ensure objectivity and fairness, we sought the judgment of an outside lawyer and took into account the content and intentions of the declarant, and took measures such as hearings". Kansai TV urged employees to report and consult with their superiors, human resources departments, compliance departments, whistleblowing hotlines, etc. They planned to re-take the survey in the future, and to expand the number of survey subjects, also considering the creation of rules regarding dinners.

President Ota reported that he would be subject of a press conference on April 4, probably regarding his involvement in the case. Kansai TV Labor Union, considering the serious situation, had begun to question the future of Ota, chairman Fukui Sumiro, and former director and advisor Hisashi Hieda (who still serves as an outside director at Kansai TV). The labor union has urged employees to vote to establish the right to strike, and after the reveal of the results of FujI TV's third-party investigations, have demanded Ota's resignation. One Kansai Television employee said in a hushed voice: "We are already inviting employees to vote to establish the right to strike, and the deadline is 6 p.m. on the 8th of this month. If the management doesn't quit by then, I think we're going to really go on strike. There is a lot of anger among employees against Mr. Ota and other management who do not quit even if they are held accountable by a third-party committee". Another employee testified: "The union is growing increasingly concerned that if we miss this opportunity, we won't be able to regain trust. If the board of directors was functioning properly, we wouldn't have to do this, but the reality is that there are no executives who can voice objections to Fukui's one-man rule." Ota announced in the press conference, that he was resigning, and that he would be replaced by Sumiro Fukui, Chairman of the Board of Directors, for the time being, and that Hieda would remain on the board of directors until June. On October 23, 2025, it was announced that Kansai TV would launch a new anime programming timeslot titled "Ka-Anival!!", which would replace the "Kadora Eleven" after three years, set to debut in January 2026.

== See also ==
- Hankyu Hanshin Toho Group

== Website ==
- Official website (in Japanese)
