= The Animation Station =

Sci Fi Channel block of animation or puppetry-related TV

- Network: Sci Fi Channel
- Launched: April 1, 1995; 30 years ago
- Closed: August 29, 1997; 28 years ago
- Country of origin: United States

The Sci-Fi Channel's Animation Station was a block of animation or puppetry-related television shows on the Sci Fi Channel (now Syfy). Some of the shows shown were Ronin Warriors, Star Wars: Droids, Star Wars: Ewoks, Transformers, Bionic Six, and The New Adventures of Gigantor.

Broadcast on the first day of April in 1995 after being renamed Cartoon Quest, the programming was eventually dropped on August 29, 1997, due to low ratings. Thomas Vitale, senior vice president of the Sci Fi Channel (Syfy), also stated that The Animation Station's cancellation was the result of competition from other networks.

As Animation Station was merely the continuation of Cartoon Quest, a good portion of the shows were retained, such as Gerry Anderson's shows.

== See also ==
- S.C.I.F.I. World
