= Block programming =

Scheduling approach in broadcasting

Block programming (also known as a strand in British broadcasting) is the arrangement of programs on radio or television so that those of a particular genre, theme, or target audience are united.

== Overview ==
Block programming involves scheduling a series of related shows which are likely to attract and hold a given audience for a long period of time. Notable examples of overt block programming have included NBC's Thursday-evening "Must See TV" lineup (built around its popular sitcom Friends, and drama ER), and Cartoon Network's Cartoon Cartoon Fridays (which primarily aired premieres of the network's original series). Reruns on cable television are often assembled into similar blocks to fill several hours of generally little-watched daytime periods. A particularly long program block, especially one that does not air on a regular schedule, is known as a marathon.

Block programming in radio also refers to programming content that appeals to various demographics in time blocks, usually corresponding to the top or bottom of the hour or the quarter-hour periods. For example, various musical genres might be featured, such as a country music hour, a three-hour afternoon block of jazz, or a four-hour Saturday night '70s disco show.

Generally speaking, block programming is anathema to modern competitive commercial radio, which traditionally uses uniform formats, other than a handful of speciality shows in off-peak hours such as weekends (for instance, the infamous beaver hours in Canadian radio). The general rationale for not using block programming is that listeners expect a certain type of music when they tune into a radio station and breaking from that format will turn those listeners away from the station; likewise, a station that airs its programming in hodgepodge blocks will have difficulty building listener loyalty, as listeners' music will only be on for a few hours of the day. This argument for homogenized radio was also a driving force behind the effective death of freeform radio in the late 20th century. The case of talk radio is indicative of the decline of block programming: prior to the 1980s, it was not uncommon to mix various blocks of talk programming together on one station, but this has declined dramatically since the late 1990s and beyond. A listener to a conservative talk radio station will have little interest in a progressive talk radio, sports radio or hot talk block, which reaches a different demographic; stations that have attempted the block strategy have historically been unsuccessful. Block programming of this nature is alive and well on outlets like public radio (such as NPR, the BBC, or CBC) and in multicultural radio serving broad ethnic and cultural audiences, although even in this realm the idea of block programming is declining due to competition for donations.

Some programming blocks have become so popular that they have been transformed to full-fledged 24-hour channels. Current channels which started as program blocks include Disney Jr. (which is still a program block on Disney Channel); the Nick Jr. Channel (based on the Nick Jr. block that still airs on Nickelodeon); Boomerang (which was once a program block on Cartoon Network); PBS Kids (which is still a program block on PBS) and MeTV Toons (which was once a programming block on MeTV). In addition, TV Land airs older shows that were once aired on sister channel Nickelodeon's Nick at Nite program block. Adult Swim is also a Cartoon Network programming block.

However, since the 2010s, new programming blocks have become rare due to airing programming in a regular format or with little or no brand reference within the programming block.

== See also ==
- Audience flow
- Lists of programming blocks
- Strip programming
- Broadcast programming
- Dayparting
- Marathon (media)
