= 2023–24 La Liga =

93rd season of La Liga

La Liga
- Season: 2023–24
- Dates: 11 August 2023 – 26 May 2024
- Champions: Real Madrid; 36th title
- Relegated: Cádiz; Almería; Granada
- Champions League: Real Madrid; Barcelona; Girona; Atlético Madrid
- Europa League: Athletic Bilbao; Real Sociedad
- Conference League: Real Betis
- Matches: 380
- Goals: 1,005 (2.64 per match)
- Best player: Jude Bellingham
- Top goalscorer: Artem Dovbyk (24 goals)
- Best goalkeeper: Unai Simón (0.92 goals/match)
- Biggest home win: Girona 7–0 Granada (24 May 2024)
- Biggest away win: Rayo Vallecano 0–7 Atlético Madrid (28 August 2023)
- Highest scoring: Real Sociedad 5–3 Granada (2 September 2023); Girona 5–3 Mallorca (23 September 2023); Barcelona 3–5 Villarreal (27 January 2024); Villarreal 4–4 Real Madrid (19 May 2024)
- Longest winning run: Real Madrid (9 matches)
- Longest unbeaten run: Real Madrid (32 matches)
- Longest winless run: Almería (28 matches)
- Longest losing run: Las Palmas (8 matches)
- Highest attendance: 77,981; Real Madrid 3–2 Barcelona (21 April 2024)
- Lowest attendance: 7,558; Almería 6–1 Cádiz (25 May 2024)
- Attendance: 11,024,398 (29,012 per match)

The 2023–24 La Liga, also known as LaLiga EA Sports due to sponsorship reasons, was the 93rd season of La Liga, Spain's premier football competition. It commenced on 11 August 2023 and ended on 26 May 2024. Barcelona were the defending champions, having won their 27th title the previous season.

On 4 May 2024, Real Madrid were officially confirmed as champions with four matches to spare following Barcelona's 4–2 defeat to Girona, securing a record-extending 36th title.

== Teams ==
Location of teams in 2023–24 La Liga
Location of Community of Madrid teams in 2023–24 La Liga
Location of teams in 2023–24 La Liga (Canary Islands)

=== Promotion and relegation (pre-season) ===
A total of twenty teams contested the league, including seventeen sides from the 2022–23 season and three promoted from the 2022–23 Segunda División. This included the two top teams from the Segunda División, and the winners of the promotion play-offs.

Teams relegated to Segunda División

The first team to be relegated from La Liga were Elche, after a 2–1 loss to Almería on 2 May 2023, ending their three-year stay in the top tier. The second team to be relegated was Espanyol, after a 2–2 draw against Valencia on 28 May 2023, ending their two-year stay in top tier. The third and final team relegated to Segunda was Valladolid, after a 0–0 draw against Getafe on 4 June 2023, ending their one year stay in top tier.

Teams promoted from Segunda División

The first two teams to earn automatic promotion from Segunda División were Granada and Las Palmas, who were first and second respectively. Granada returned to La Liga after a one-year absence, while Las Palmas came back after a five-year absence. The third and final team to be promoted were Alavés, after winning the play-off final against Levante on 17 June 2023, returning after a onе-year absence.

Promoted from 2022–23 Segunda División	Relegated from 2022–23 La Liga
Granada; Las Palmas; Alavés	Valladolid; Espanyol; Elche

=== Stadiums and locations ===
Team	Location	Stadium	Capacity
Alavés	Vitoria-Gasteiz	Mendizorroza	19,840
Almería	Almería	Power Horse Stadium	18,331
Athletic Bilbao	Bilbao	San Mamés	53,289
Atlético Madrid	Madrid (San Blas-Canillejas)	Cívitas Metropolitano	70,460
Barcelona	Barcelona	Estadi Olímpic Lluís Companys	49,472
Cádiz	Cádiz	Nuevo Mirandilla	20,724
Celta Vigo	Vigo	ABANCA Balaídos	29,000
Getafe	Getafe	Coliseum	16,500
Girona	Girona	Montilivi	13,400
Granada	Granada	Nuevo Los Cármenes	19,189
Las Palmas	Las Palmas	Gran Canaria	31,250
Mallorca	Palma	Mallorca Son Moix	23,142
Osasuna	Pamplona	El Sadar	23,576
Rayo Vallecano	Madrid (Puente de Vallecas)	Vallecas	14,708
Real Betis	Seville	Benito Villamarín	60,721
Real Madrid	Madrid (Chamartín)	Santiago Bernabéu	83,186
Real Sociedad	San Sebastián	Reale Arena	39,500
Sevilla	Seville	Ramón Sánchez-Pizjuán	43,883
Valencia	Valencia	Mestalla	49,430
Villarreal	Villarreal	Estadio de la Cerámica	23,008

=== Personnel and sponsorship ===
Team	Manager	Captain	Kit manufacturer	Main kit sponsor	Other kit sponsor(s)
Alavés	(Spain) Luis García	(Spain) Rubén Duarte	Puma	LEA, Araba-Álava	Digi,^{1} OK Mobility,^{2} Hoteles Silken,^{3} Integra Energía^{3}
Almería	(Spain) Pepe Mel	(Spain) Fernando	Castore	Khaled Juffali Company	Ajlan & Brothers,^{1} Power Horse,^{1} Durrat Al Arous,^{2} Kudu^{3}
Athletic Bilbao	(Spain) Ernesto Valverde	(Spain) Iker Muniain	Castore	Kutxabank	Digi,^{1} B2BinPay,^{2} Vueling^{3}
Atlético Madrid	(Argentina) Diego Simeone	(Spain) Koke	Nike	Riyadh Air	Ria Money Transfer,^{1} Hyundai^{2}
Barcelona	(Spain) Xavi	(Spain) Sergi Roberto	Nike	Spotify	UNHCR,^{1} Ambilight TV^{2}
Cádiz	(Argentina) Mauricio Pellegrino	(Spain) José Mari	Macron	Digi, Turismo de Cádiz	Hospitales Pascual,^{1} Wehumans^{2}^{3}
Celta Vigo	(Spain) Claudio Giráldez	(Spain) Iago Aspas	Adidas	Estrella Galicia 0,0	Abanca,^{1} EBPay,^{2} Grupo Recalvi^{3}
Getafe	(Spain) José Bordalás	(Togo) Djené	Joma	Tecnocasa	Realme,^{1} TBTY News^{2}
Girona	(Spain) Míchel	(Uruguay) Cristhian Stuani	Puma	Gosbi	Marlex,^{1} HYLO,^{2} Costa Brava,^{3} Parlem^{3}
Granada	(Spain) José Ramón Sandoval	(Spain) Víctor Díaz	Adidas	Wiber	Greening Group,^{1} Caja Rural Granada^{2}
Las Palmas	(Spain) García Pimienta	(Spain) Kirian Rodríguez	Hummel	Gran Canaria	Disa,^{1} IOC,^{1} Kalise,^{2} Cordial Hotels,^{3} Volkswagen Domingo Alonso^{3}
Mallorca	(Mexico) Javier Aguirre	(Spain) Antonio Raíllo	Nike	αGEL	Alua,^{1} Juaneda,^{1} OK Mobility,^{2} Air Europa,^{3} Formentera^{3}
Osasuna	(Spain) Jagoba Arrasate	(Spain) David García	Adidas	Kosner	HR Motor,^{1} Celer,^{2} Clínica Universidad de Navarra^{3}
Rayo Vallecano	(Spain) Iñigo Pérez	(Argentina) Óscar Trejo	Umbro	Digi	GCS^{2}
Real Betis	(Chile) Manuel Pellegrini	(France) Nabil Fekir	Hummel	Finetwork	Forever Green,^{1} Reale Seguros,^{2} AUS Global^{3}
Real Madrid	(Italy) Carlo Ancelotti	(Spain) Nacho	Adidas	Emirates	HP^{2}
Real Sociedad	(Spain) Imanol Alguacil	(Spain) Mikel Oyarzabal	Macron	Yasuda Group	Kutxabank,^{1} Reale Seguros,^{2} Finetwork^{3}
Sevilla	(Spain) Quique Sánchez Flores	(Spain) Jesús Navas	Castore	None	Socios.com,^{1} JD Sports^{2}
Valencia	(Spain) Rubén Baraja	(Spain) José Gayà	Puma	TM Real Estate Group	Divina Seguros,^{2} Škoda^{3}
Villarreal	(Spain) Marcelino	(Spain) Raúl Albiol	Joma	Pamesa Cerámica	Ascale^{1}

1. On the back of shirt.
2. On the sleeves.
3. On the shorts.

=== Managerial changes ===
Team	Outgoing manager	Manner of departure	Date of vacancy	Position in table	Incoming manager	Date of appointment
Almería	(Spain) Rubi	End of contract	30 June 2023	Pre-season	(Spain) Vicente Moreno	17 June 2023
Celta Vigo	(Portugal) Carlos Carvalhal	End of contract	30 June 2023	Pre-season	(Spain) Rafael Benítez	23 June 2023
Rayo Vallecano	(Spain) Andoni Iraola	End of contract	30 June 2023	Pre-season	(Spain) Francisco	28 June 2023
Villarreal	(Spain) Quique Setién	Sacked	5 September 2023	15th	(Spain) Pacheta	9 September 2023
Almería	(Spain) Vicente Moreno	Sacked	29 September 2023	20th	(Spain) Alberto Lasarte (caretaker)	29 September 2023
Sevilla	(Spain) José Luis Mendilibar	Sacked	8 October 2023	14th	(Uruguay) Diego Alonso	10 October 2023
Almería	(Spain) Alberto Lasarte	End of caretaker spell	8 October 2023	20th	(Spain) Gaizka Garitano	8 October 2023
Villarreal	(Spain) Pacheta	Sacked	10 November 2023	13th	(Spain) Miguel Ángel Tena (caretaker)	10 November 2023
Villarreal	(Spain) Miguel Ángel Tena	End of caretaker spell	13 November 2023	14th	(Spain) Marcelino	13 November 2023
Granada	(Spain) Paco López	Sacked	26 November 2023	19th	(Uruguay) Alexander Medina	27 November 2023
Sevilla	(Uruguay) Diego Alonso	Sacked	16 December 2023	16th	(Spain) Quique Sánchez Flores	18 December 2023
Cádiz	(Spain) Sergio González	Sacked	23 January 2024	18th	(Argentina) Mauricio Pellegrino	24 January 2024
Rayo Vallecano	(Spain) Francisco	Sacked	13 February 2024	14th	(Spain) Iñigo Pérez	15 February 2024
Celta Vigo	(Spain) Rafael Benítez	Sacked	12 March 2024	17th	(Spain) Claudio Giráldez	12 March 2024
Almería	(Spain) Gaizka Garitano	Sacked	13 March 2024	20th	(Spain) Pepe Mel	13 March 2024
Granada	(Uruguay) Alexander Medina	Sacked	19 March 2024	19th	(Spain) José Ramón Sandoval	19 March 2024

== League table ==
Pos	Team	Pld	W	D	L	GF	GA	GD	Pts	Qualification or relegation
1	Real Madrid (C)	38	29	8	1	87	26	+61	95	Qualification for the Champions League league phase
2	Barcelona	38	26	7	5	79	44	+35	85	Qualification for the Champions League league phase
3	Girona	38	25	6	7	85	46	+39	81	Qualification for the Champions League league phase
4	Atlético Madrid	38	24	4	10	70	43	+27	76	Qualification for the Champions League league phase
5	Athletic Bilbao	38	19	11	8	61	37	+24	68	Qualification for the Europa League league phase (Note: Since the winners of the 2023–24 Copa del Rey, Athletic Bilbao, qualified for European competition based on league position, the Europa League berth awarded to the Copa del Rey winners was passed to the sixth-placed team, and the Conference League berth awarded to the sixth-placed team was passed to the seventh-placed team.)
6	Real Sociedad	38	16	12	10	51	39	+12	60	Qualification for the Europa League league phase
7	Real Betis	38	14	15	9	48	45	+3	57	Qualification for the Conference League play-off round
8	Villarreal	38	14	11	13	65	65	0	53	
9	Valencia	38	13	10	15	40	45	−5	49	
10	Alavés	38	12	10	16	36	46	−10	46	
11	Osasuna	38	12	9	17	45	56	−11	45	
12	Getafe	38	10	13	15	42	54	−12	43	
13	Celta Vigo	38	10	11	17	46	57	−11	41 (Note: Celta Vigo finished ahead of Sevilla on head-to-head points: Celta Vigo 1–1 Sevilla, Sevilla 1–2 Celta Vigo.)	
14	Sevilla	38	10	11	17	48	54	−6	41	
15	Mallorca	38	8	16	14	33	44	−11	40 (Note: Mallorca finished ahead of Las Palmas on head-to-head points: Las Palmas 1–1 Mallorca, Mallorca 1–0 Las Palmas.)	
16	Las Palmas	38	10	10	18	33	47	−14	40	
17	Rayo Vallecano	38	8	14	16	29	48	−19	38	
18	Cádiz (R)	38	6	15	17	26	55	−29	33	Relegation to Segunda División
19	Almería (R)	38	3	12	23	43	75	−32	21 (Note: Tied on head-to-head points. Almería finished ahead of Granada on overall goal difference.)	Relegation to Segunda División
20	Granada (R)	38	4	9	25	38	79	−41	21	Relegation to Segunda División

Source: LaLiga EA Sports
Rules for classification: 1) Points; 2) Head-to-head points; 3) Head-to-head goal difference; 4) Goal difference; 5) Goals scored; 6) Fair-play points
(Note: Head-to-head record is used only after all the matches between the teams in question have been played)
(C) Champions; (R) Relegation

== Results ==
Home \ Away	ALA	ALM	ATH	ATM	BAR	CAD	CEL	GET	GIR	GRA	LPA	MLL	OSA	RAY	BET	RMA	RSO	SEV	VAL	VIL
Alavés	—	1–0	0–2	2–0	1–3	1–0	3–0	1–0	2–2	3–1	0–1	1–1	0–2	1–0	1–1	0–1	0–1	4–3	1–0	1–1
Almería	0–3	—	0–0	2–2	0–2	6–1	2–3	1–3	0–0	3–3	1–2	0–0	0–3	0–2	0–0	1–3	1–3	2–2	2–2	1–2
Athletic Bilbao	2–0	3–0	—	2–0	0–0	3–0	4–3	2–2	3–2	1–1	1–0	4–0	2–2	4–0	4–2	0–2	2–1	2–0	2–2	1–1
Atlético Madrid	2–1	2–1	3–1	—	0–3	3–2	1–0	3–3	3–1	3–1	5–0	1–0	1–4	2–1	2–1	3–1	2–1	1–0	2–0	3–1
Barcelona	2–1	3–2	1–0	1–0	—	2–0	3–2	4–0	2–4	3–3	1–0	1–0	1–0	3–0	5–0	1–2	2–0	1–0	4–2	3–5
Cádiz	1–0	1–1	0–0	2–0	0–1	—	2–2	1–0	0–1	1–0	0–0	1–1	1–1	0–0	0–2	0–3	0–0	2–2	1–4	3–1
Celta Vigo	1–1	1–0	2–1	0–3	1–2	1–1	—	2–2	0–1	1–0	4–1	0–1	0–2	0–0	2–1	0–1	0–1	1–1	2–2	3–2
Getafe	1–0	2–1	0–2	0–3	0–0	1–0	3–2	—	1–0	2–0	3–3	1–2	3–2	0–2	1–1	0–2	1–1	0–1	1–0	0–0
Girona	3–0	5–2	1–1	4–3	4–2	4–1	1–0	3–0	—	7–0	1–0	5–3	2–0	3–0	3–2	0–3	0–0	5–1	2–1	0–1
Granada	2–0	1–1	1–1	0–1	2–2	2–0	1–2	1–1	2–4	—	1–1	3–2	3–0	0–2	1–1	0–4	2–3	0–3	0–1	2–3
Las Palmas	1–1	0–1	0–2	2–1	1–2	1–1	2–1	2–0	0–2	1–0	—	1–1	1–1	0–1	2–2	1–2	0–0	0–2	2–0	3–0
Mallorca	0–0	2–2	0–0	0–1	2–2	1–1	1–1	0–0	1–0	1–0	1–0	—	3–2	2–1	0–1	0–1	1–2	1–0	1–1	0–1
Osasuna	1–0	1–0	0–2	0–2	1–2	2–0	0–3	3–2	2–4	2–0	1–1	1–1	—	1–0	0–2	2–4	1–1	0–0	0–1	1–1
Rayo Vallecano	2–0	0–1	0–1	0–7	1–1	1–1	0–0	0–0	1–2	2–1	0–2	2–2	2–1	—	2–0	1–1	2–2	1–2	0–1	1–1
Real Betis	0–0	3–2	3–1	0–0	2–4	1–1	2–1	1–1	1–1	1–0	1–0	2–0	2–1	1–0	—	1–1	0–2	1–1	3–0	2–3
Real Madrid	5–0	3–2	2–0	1–1	3–2	3–0	4–0	2–1	4–0	2–0	2–0	1–0	4–0	0–0	0–0	—	2–1	1–0	5–1	4–1
Real Sociedad	1–1	2–2	3–0	0–2	0–1	2–0	1–1	4–3	1–1	5–3	2–0	1–0	0–1	0–0	0–0	0–1	—	2–1	1–0	1–3
Sevilla	2–3	5–1	0–2	1–0	1–2	0–1	1–2	0–3	1–2	3–0	1–0	2–1	1–1	2–2	1–1	1–1	3–2	—	1–2	1–1
Valencia	0–1	2–1	1–0	3–0	1–1	2–0	0–0	1–0	1–3	1–0	1–0	0–0	1–2	0–0	1–2	2–2	0–1	0–0	—	3–1
Villarreal	1–1	2–1	2–3	1–2	3–4	0–0	3–2	1–1	1–2	5–1	1–2	1–1	3–1	3–0	1–2	4–4	0–3	3–2	1–0	—

Source: LaLiga EA Sports
Legend: Blue = home team win; Yellow = draw; Red = away team win.
For upcoming matches, an "a" indicates there is an article about the rivalry between the two participants.

== Season statistics ==
=== Scoring ===
- First goal of the season:
  (Spain) Isi Palazón for Rayo Vallecano against Almería (11 August 2023)
- Final goal of the season:
  (Spain) Fermín López for Barcelona against Sevilla (26 May 2024)

=== Top goalscorers ===
Rank	Player	Club	Goals
1	(Ukraine) Artem Dovbyk	Girona	24
2	(Norway) Alexander Sørloth	Villarreal	23
3	(England) Jude Bellingham	Real Madrid	19
3	(Poland) Robert Lewandowski	Barcelona	19
5	(Croatia) Ante Budimir	Osasuna	17
6	(Morocco) Youssef En-Nesyri	Sevilla	16
6	(France) Antoine Griezmann	Atlético Madrid	16
8	(Spain) Borja Mayoral	Getafe	15
8	(Spain) Álvaro Morata	Atlético Madrid	15
8	(Brazil) Vinícius Júnior	Real Madrid	15

==== Hat-tricks ====
Player	For	Against	Result	Date	Round
(Colombia) Luis Suárez	Almería	Granada	3–3 (H)	1 October 2023	8
(France) Antoine Griezmann	Atlético Madrid	Celta Vigo	3–0 (A)	21 October 2023	10
(Spain) José Luis Morales	Villarreal	Osasuna	3–1 (H)	26 November 2023	14
(Spain) Álvaro Morata	Atlético Madrid	Girona	3–4 (A)	3 January 2024	19
(Spain) Ferran Torres	Barcelona	Real Betis	4–2 (A)	21 January 2024	21
(Ukraine) Artem Dovbyk	Girona	Sevilla	5–1 (H)	21 January 2024	21
(Norway) Alexander Sørloth	Villarreal	Granada	5–1 (H)	3 March 2024	27
(Poland) Robert Lewandowski	Barcelona	Valencia	4–2 (H)	29 April 2024	33
(France) Antoine Griezmann	Atlético Madrid	Getafe	3–0 (A)	15 May 2024	36
(Norway) Alexander Sørloth^{4}	Villarreal	Real Madrid	4–4 (H)	19 May 2024	37
(Ukraine) Artem Dovbyk	Girona	Granada	7–0 (H)	24 May 2024	38

^{4} – Player scored four goals.

=== Top assists ===
Rank	Player	Club	Assists
1	(Spain) Álex Baena	Villarreal	14
2	(Brazil) Savinho	Girona	11
2	(Spain) Nico Williams	Athletic Bilbao	11
4	(Spain) Iago Aspas	Celta Vigo	10
5	(Germany) İlkay Gündoğan	Barcelona	9
5	(Brazil) Raphinha	Barcelona	9
7	(Brazil) Yan Couto	Girona	8
7	(Ukraine) Artem Dovbyk	Girona	8
7	(Spain) Miguel Gutiérrez	Girona	8
7	(Germany) Toni Kroos	Real Madrid	8
7	(Poland) Robert Lewandowski	Barcelona	8

=== Zamora Trophy ===
The Zamora Trophy was awarded by newspaper Marca to the goalkeeper with the lowest goals-to-games ratio. A goalkeeper had to have played at least 28 matches of 60 or more minutes to be eligible for the trophy.

Rank	Player	Club	Matches	Goals against	Average
1	(Spain) Unai Simón	Athletic Bilbao	36	33	0.92
2	(Germany) Marc-André ter Stegen	Barcelona	28	27	0.96
3	(Spain) Álex Remiro	Real Sociedad	36	36	1.00
4	(Spain) Antonio Sivera	Alavés	34	38	1.12
5	(Slovenia) Jan Oblak	Atlético Madrid	38	43	1.13

=== Discipline ===
==== Player ====
- Most yellow cards: 17
  - (Spain) Iván Alejo (Cádiz)
- Most red cards: 3
  - (Argentina) Chimy Ávila (Osasuna / Real Betis)

==== Team ====
- Most yellow cards: 126
  - Getafe
- Fewest yellow cards: 60
  - Valencia
- Most red cards: 9
  - Getafe
- Fewest red cards: 1
  - Alavés
  - Girona

== Awards ==
=== Monthly awards ===
Month	Manager of the Month		Player of the Month		U23 Player of the Month		Goal of the Month		Play of the Month		References
Month	Manager	Club	Player	Club	Player	Club	Player	Club	Player(s)	Club	References
August	(Italy) Carlo Ancelotti	Real Madrid	(England) Jude Bellingham	Real Madrid	(Spain) Lamine Yamal	Barcelona	(Netherlands) Memphis Depay	Atlético Madrid	(Spain) Gorka Guruzeta (Spain) Nico Williams	Athletic Bilbao	
September	(Spain) Míchel	Girona	(Japan) Takefusa Kubo	Real Sociedad	(Spain) Javi Guerra	Valencia	(Portugal) João Cancelo	Barcelona	(Spain) Fran García (Uruguay) Federico Valverde	Real Madrid	
October	(Argentina) Diego Simeone	Atlético Madrid	(England) Jude Bellingham	Real Madrid	(Spain) Bryan Zaragoza	Granada	(Equatorial Guinea) Saúl Coco	Las Palmas	(Spain) Gerard Gumbau (Spain) Bryan Zaragoza	Granada	
November	(Spain) Míchel	Girona	(France) Antoine Griezmann	Atlético Madrid	(Brazil) Rodrygo	Real Madrid	(Croatia) Ivan Rakitić	Sevilla	(Spain) Alberto Moleiro (Spain) Kirian Rodríguez	Las Palmas	
December	(Spain) Ernesto Valverde	Athletic Bilbao	(Ukraine) Artem Dovbyk	Girona	(Brazil) Yan Couto	Girona	(Spain) Aitor Ruibal	Real Betis	(Spain) Nico Williams (Spain) Iñigo Lekue	Athletic Bilbao	
January	(Spain) Míchel	Girona	(Spain) Kirian Rodríguez	Las Palmas	(Brazil) Savinho	Girona	(Spain) Jesús Areso	Osasuna	(Spain) Ferran Torres (Portugal) João Félix	Barcelona	
February	(Spain) Ernesto Valverde	Athletic Bilbao	(Poland) Robert Lewandowski	Barcelona	(United States) Johnny Cardoso	Real Betis	(Brazil) Vinícius Júnior	Real Madrid	(Spain) Álex Sola (Spain) Samu Omorodion	Alavés	
March	(Spain) Marcelino	Villarreal	(Brazil) Vinícius Júnior	Real Madrid	(Spain) Pau Cubarsí	Barcelona	(Spain) Lamine Yamal	Barcelona	(Spain) Mikel Oyarzabal (Spain) Mikel Merino	Real Sociedad	
April	(Italy) Carlo Ancelotti	Real Madrid	(Spain) Isco	Real Betis	(Spain) Miguel Gutiérrez	Girona	(Portugal) João Félix	Barcelona	(Spain) Isco (France) Nabil Fekir	Real Betis	

=== Annual awards ===
Award	Winner	Club	Ref.
Player of the Season	(England) Jude Bellingham	Real Madrid	
U23 Player of the Season	(Spain) Lamine Yamal	Barcelona	
Goal of the Season	(Spain) Jesús Areso	Osasuna	
Coach of the Season	(Spain) Míchel	Girona	

==== Team of the Season ====
Ea Sports Team of the Season
Goalkeeper	(Spain) Unai Simón (Athletic Bilbao)				
Defenders	(Spain) Dani Carvajal (Real Madrid)		(Uruguay) Ronald Araújo (Barcelona)	(Germany) Antonio Rüdiger (Real Madrid)	(Spain) Miguel Gutiérrez (Girona)
Midfielders	(England) Jude Bellingham (Real Madrid)	(Uruguay) Federico Valverde (Real Madrid)	(Spain) Isco (Real Betis)	(Germany) İlkay Gündoğan (Barcelona)	(Spain) Aleix García (Girona)
Forwards	(Brazil) Vinícius Júnior (Real Madrid)	(France) Antoine Griezmann (Atlético Madrid)	(Poland) Robert Lewandowski (Barcelona)	(Brazil) Sávio (Girona)	(Ukraine) Artem Dovbyk (Girona)

== Attendances ==
Real Madrid drew the highest average home attendance in the 2023-24 edition of La Liga.

#	Football club	Home games	Average attendance
1	Real Madrid	19	72,061
2	Atlético de Madrid	19	59,731
3	Real Betis	19	51,175
4	Athletic Club	19	46,112
5	Valencia CF	19	43,420
6	FC Barcelona	19	39,846
7	Sevilla FC	19	35,494
8	Real Sociedad	19	31,710
9	UD Las Palmas	19	25,041
10	Celta de Vigo	19	20,039
11	Osasuna	19	19,703
12	Cádiz CF	19	18,016
13	Villarreal CF	19	17,957
14	RCD Mallorca	19	17,767
15	Deportivo Alavés	19	17,391
16	Granada CF	19	16,350
17	UD Almería	19	12,893
18	Rayo Vallecano	19	12,758
19	Girona FC	19	12,520
20	Getafe CF	19	11,456

== See also ==
- 2023–24 Copa del Rey
- 2023–24 Segunda División
- 2023–24 Primera Federación
- 2023–24 Segunda Federación
- 2023–24 Tercera Federación
