= Javier Mariscal =

Spanish artist (born 1950)

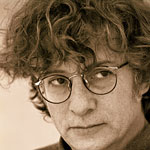
- Born: Francisco Javier Errando Mariscal; 9 February 1950 (age 76); Valencia, Spain
- Education: ELISAVA
- Website: en.mariscal.com

Francisco Javier Errando Mariscal, better known as Javier Mariscal (born 9 February 1950), is a Spanish artist and designer whose work has spanned a wide range of mediums, ranging from painting and sculpture to interior design and landscaping. He is best known for creating Cobi, the official mascot for the 1992 Barcelona Summer Olympics. Cobi was a stylized dog and became one of the most recognizable Olympic mascots.

He was born in February 1950 in the city of Valencia, Spain, into a family of eleven brothers and sisters. Since 1970, he has been living and working in Barcelona.

== Career ==
Mariscal's artistic language is synthetic, with few strokes and a great deal of expressiveness. He started studying at Colegio El Pilar in Valencia. After that he studied design at the Elisava School in Barcelona, but he soon left to learn directly in his environment and follow his own creative impulses. His first steps were in underground comics, a task that he soon combined with illustration, sculpture, graphic design and interior design.

In 1979, he designed the Bar-Cel-Ona logo, a work that would make him popular. The following year, he opened the first bar in Valencia designed by Mariscal, together with Fernando Salas, the Duplex, for which he designed one of his most famous pieces, the Duplex stool, an authentic icon of the 1980s. In 1981, his work as a furniture designer led him to participate in the exhibition Memphis, an International Style, in Milan. In 1987, he gave an exhibition at the Centre Georges Pompidou in Paris and participated in the Documenta de Kassel.

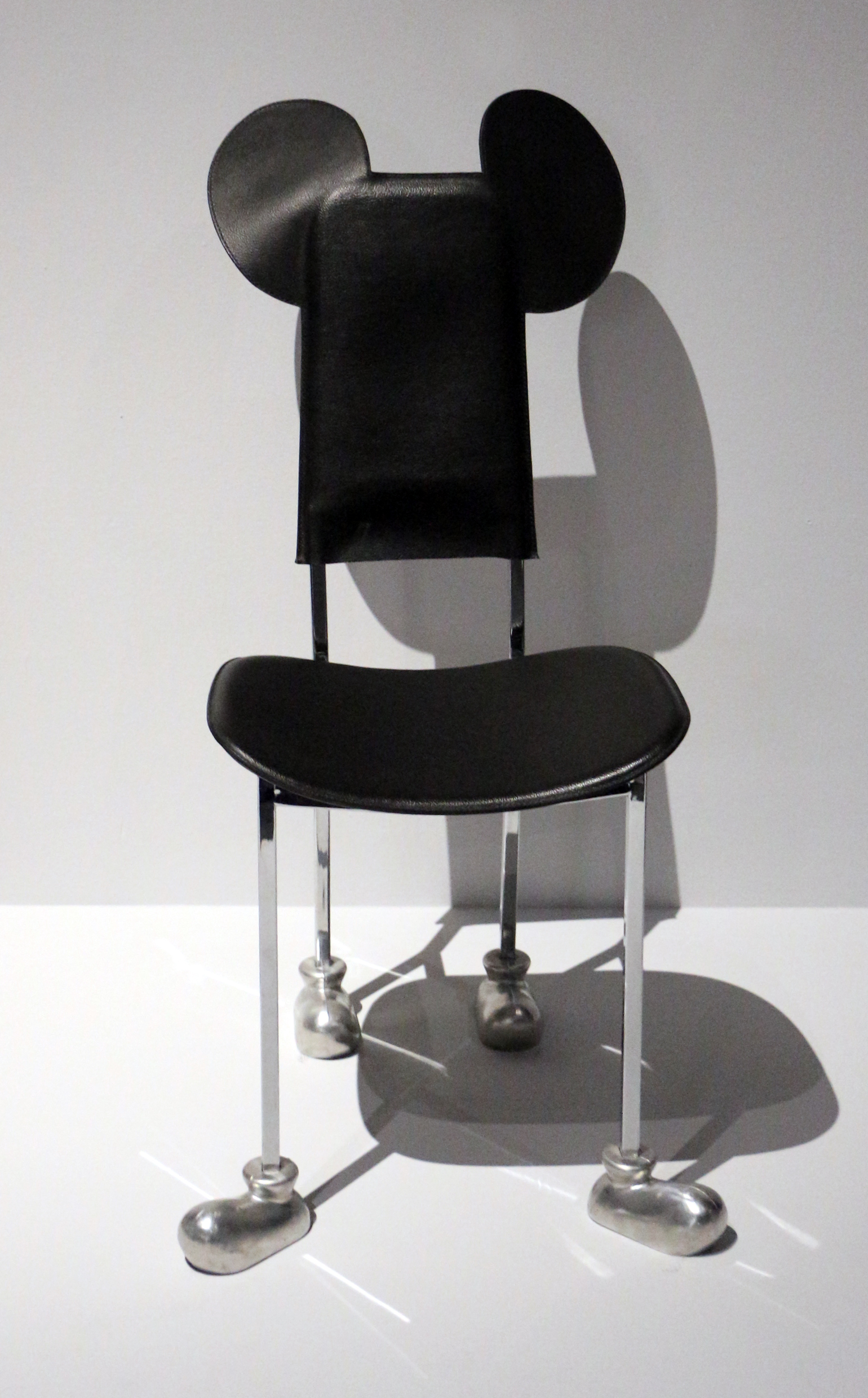
Garriris, 1987, Musée national d'art moderne, Paris

Throughout the 1980s, he designed several textile collections for Marieta and Tráfico de Modas and exhibited at the Vinçon salon in Barcelona. In 1989, Cobi was chosen as the official mascot for the 1992 Summer Olympics to be held in Barcelona. The mascot was the centre of great controversy because of its vanguard style, but Cobi is now recognised as the most profitable mascot in the history of the modern games. He also created Petra, the official mascot of the 1992 Summer Paralympics. He was later the creative and artistic director of the animated television series The Cobi Troupe that starred both mascots.

He opened Estudio Mariscal in 1989 and since then he has collaborated on a variety of projects with designers and architects such as Arata Isozaki, Alfredo Arribas, Fernando Salas, Fernando Amat and Pepe Cortés. His most notable works include the visual identities for the Swedish social democratic party, Socialdemokraterna; the Spanish radio station Onda Cero; Barcelona Zoo; the University of Valencia; the Lighthouse Centre for Architecture and Design in Glasgow, the GranShip Cultural Centre in Japan and the London postproduction company, Framestore.

In 1995, Twipsy was chosen as the mascot for the Expo 2000 in Hannover. The success of this mascot led to the Twipsy series, in which the star is a virtual space messenger and the action is set in the Internet. Twipsy was sold to over one hundred countries. In 1995, Mariscal also designed the Amorosos Furniture collection for the Italian manufacturer Moroso, which includes one of his most successful pieces of furniture, the Alexandra armchair, in which the organic shapes and the use he makes of colour communicate the vital, extroverted style that characterises Mariscal's objects.

In 1995, Mariscal collaborated with schoolchildren in the Land of Valencia to create a collective mural sculpture during protest days for the use of the Valencian language in the education. The mural is now located in the Teacher's Faculty of the University of Valencia and open to the public free of charge.

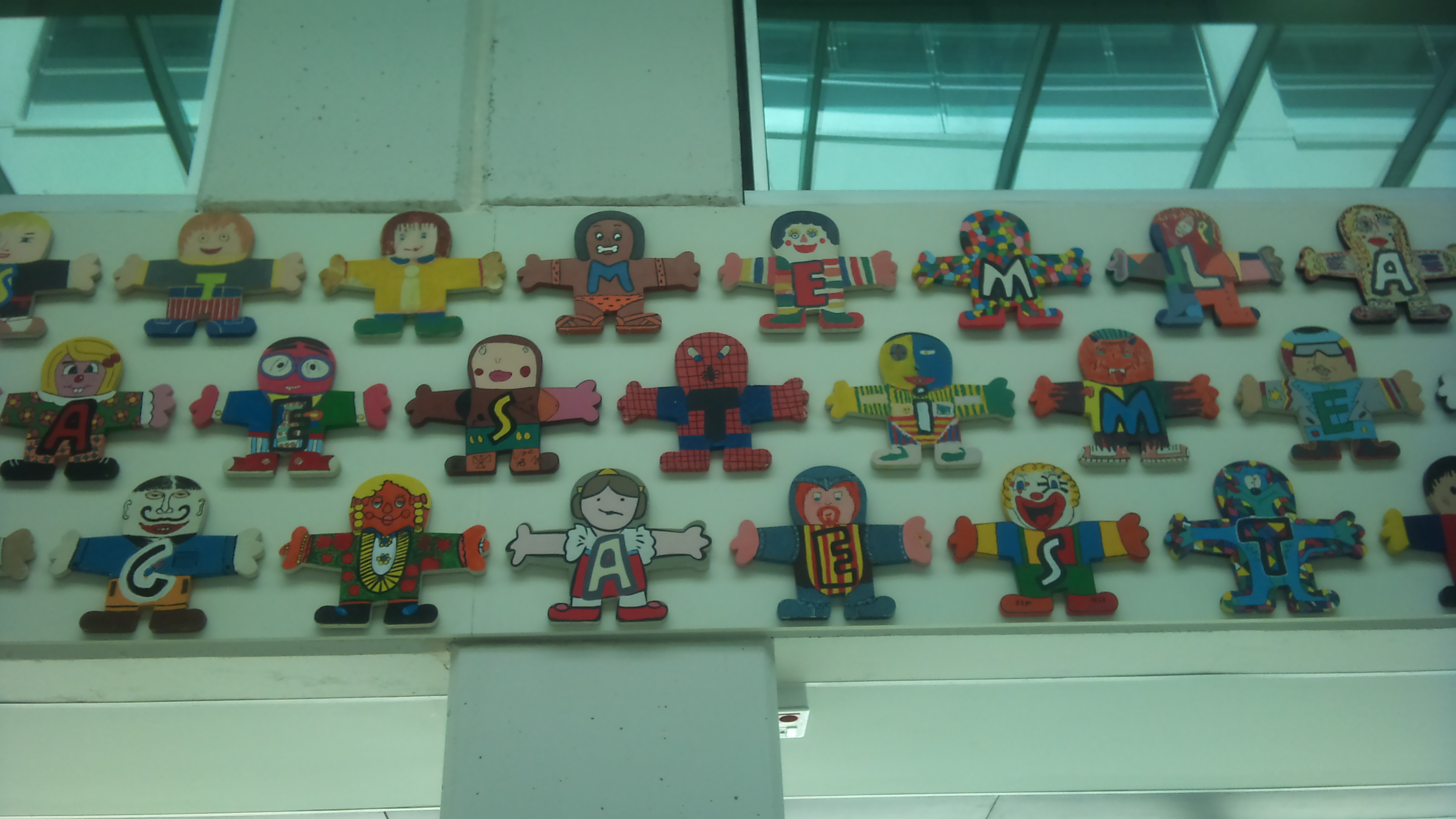
Partial view of the mural created by Mariscal and students of Valencian schools as part of "Meeting of Valencian Schools (language)" in 1995.

In 2001, he designed the much sought after diary room chair used in Channel 4's second instalment of Big Brother.

In 2002, his multidisciplinary career culminated with the integral design of the Gran Hotel Domine Bilbao, nestling between the Guggenheim Museum in Bilbao and the ria, the creative concept of which is based on reflecting the history of design of the 20th century. Mariscal designed things from the uniforms to the façade, including the graphic image and its website. He did the interior design of the GHDB with Fernando Salas, who also collaborated in Calle 54 Club, a project in which Fernando Trueba also forms part and which provides Madrid with a live space where the most prestigious Latin jazz musicians perform, such as Bebo Valdés and Paquito D'Rivera. Madrid is also the home of Hotel Puerta América, belonging to the Silken Group, a project in which the best architecture and design studios of the moment participated. Estudio Mariscal and Fernando Salas were responsible for the interior design of the eleventh floor.

Another sample of his interdisciplinary vocation is the audiovisual show Colors, which premiered in Barcelona in 1999 and starred the robot Dimitri, another of Mariscal's creatures. The script of Colors has been adapted for the frequent conferences on design he gives all over the world which, rather than conferences are entertaining pocket shows marked with humour and tenderness.

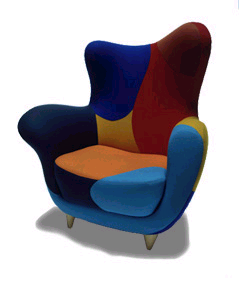
Sillón Alexandra, para Moroso

In 2005, he made several objects for the children's collection, Me Too, by Magis, a fruitful collaboration that is still under way. Some of his most recent works, which he continues to combine with his artistic task, are the image of the Spanish financial institution, Bancaja; that of the 32nd America's Cup, of the new brand of bags for Camper, Camper For Hands, as well as the interior design of the Ikea Restaurant in Vitoria.

In 2006, he participated in ARCO with the sculpture, Crash!, a homage to the optimist design of the 1950s and a way of telling us that that confidence in the future has exploded because now we need to think about how to make a future possible.

In 2009, from 1 July until 1 November, a major UK retrospective of Mariscal's work was shown at the London Design Museum, in which visitors enter through a tunnel showing 640 examples of the designer's style from 1970 to the present day, including his typefaces. He will also be creating a mural for the outside of the Design Museum itself.

Mariscal drew and co-directed, with Academy Award-winning director Fernando Trueba, the 2010 Spanish-British animated feature-length film Chico and Rita. The film celebrates the music and culture of Cuba and depicts a love story set against backdrops of Havana, New York, Las Vegas, Hollywood and Paris in the late 1940s and early 1950s. The film was nominated for the Academy Award for Best Animated Feature.

He and Trueba collaborated a second time on the 2023 animated feature They Shot the Piano Player (Dispararon al pianista).

== Awards ==
In 1999, Mariscal received the National Design Prize of the Spanish Department of Industry and the BCD Foundation grants in recognition of achievements throughout a professional career. In 2011 he won the Award of the Hungarian National Student Jury for Chico and Rita at the 7th Festival of European Animated Feature Films and TV Specials.
