= Cobi and Petra =

Official mascots of the 1992 Summer Olympics and Paralympics in Barcelona

Cobi

Mascot of the 1992 Summer Olympics (Barcelona)
- Creator: Javier Mariscal
- Significance: Catalan Sheepdog in Cubist style

Petra

Mascot of the 1992 Summer Paralympics (Barcelona)
- Creator: Javier Mariscal
- Significance: Armless girl in Cubist style

Cobi is an orange Catalan Sheepdog drawn in a Cubist style by Javier Mariscal that is the official mascot of the 1992 Summer Olympics held in Barcelona, Spain. Petra, also by Mariscal, is the official mascot of the 1992 Summer Paralympics.

== Cobi ==
Before creating Cobi, Mariscal had first attempted a shrimp mascot that "looked stupid on a bicycle" and a sheep dog mascot that looked too much like an ape, according to the Associated Press. He settled on a Catalan Sheepdog in honor of the host city of Barcelona, located in Catalonia, and chose to depict the dog with a Cubist style as a nod to Pablo Picasso, specifically his interpretations of Las Meninas. Cobi was unveiled to the public in 1987, and his name was derived from the Barcelona Olympic Organising Committee (COOB). Cobi was initially criticized by Catalan people, who did not consider Mariscal to be as worthy of representing them as deceased Catalan artists such as Joan Miró, and Gaudí. Eventually the Catalan people embraced Cobi, as did many Spaniards and Olympics viewers.

Mariscal explained, "Cobi is the first Olympic mascot to be sad, to be crying, to be depressed." He has a Mona Lisa smile, opposable thumb in some renderings, a nose is on the side of his head, and "a sly grin" according to Mariscal. "He can be a bad, a poor little boy, a druggie, a guy who is cleaning your car windows, an athlete, an idealist carrying the Olympic flag, or a disillusioned youth." Mariscal designed the character to have a personality that differs from the intense competitive spirit of the Olympics, saying "The best thing about Cobi is that he has the desire to live life. Cobi is the more relaxed part of the Olympics."

Mariscal, age 42 at the time, had started his cartoonist career in repressive Francoist Spain before Franco's death in 1975, and risen to prominence as one of Spain's most celebrated design figures at that time. He was characterized as a "social critic and first-class cynic".

Cobi's likeness was all over Barcelona, on billboards for products like Coca-Cola, Ray-Ban, and Brother typewriters, and on T-shirts, mugs, and even bottles of bath gel. A set of large statues in the city showed Cobi playing each of the 28 Olympic sporting events, and stores sold stuffed toys of Cobi for children. Gannett News Service reported: "Cobi's picture is all over this city. On billboards, busses, flags. On food wrappers, Coke cans, baseball caps. He is inescapable as death, taxes, and horn-honking cabbies." The character's licensing contributed 3.59% of the cost of the Olympic Games.

== Petra ==
Petra is the Paralympic mascot for the Barcelona 1992 Paralympic Games, created by the Spanish illustrator Javier Mariscal, an expert in product and industrial design. After a design competition, he was selected to craft both the Paralympic and Olympic mascots of Barcelona 1992 Games. The inspiration behind Petra, has been the artists' daughter who has drawn a similar character, which is aligned with the concept.

Petra is a mascot depicted with long legs and no arms, carrying a flag with the Barcelona 1992 logo. She was the first Paralympic mascot with a visible physical impairment. Official descriptions characterize her as outgoing and cheerful, welcoming fans and supporting athletes throughout the Games.

== The Cobi Troupe ==
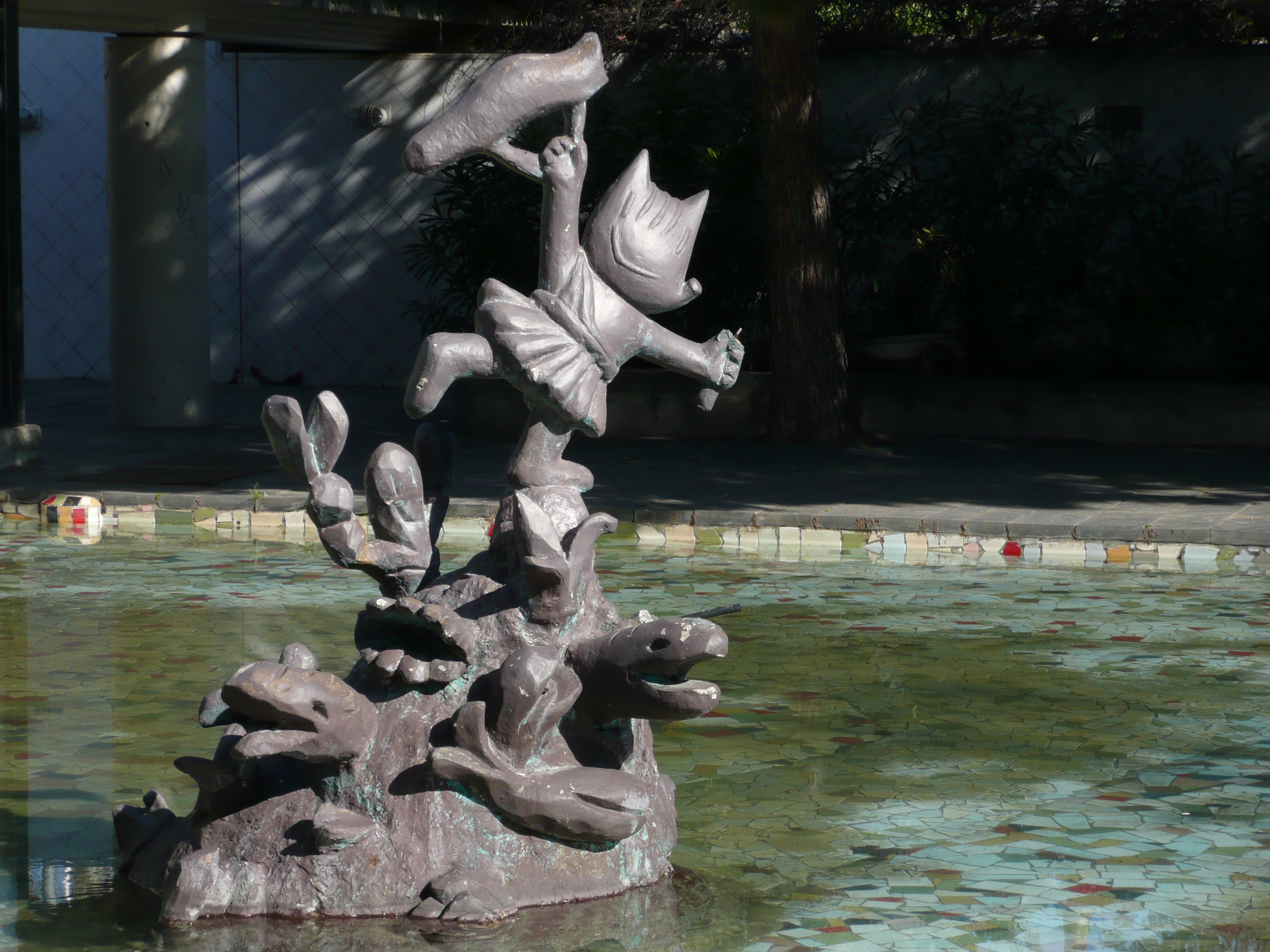
Sculpture of Cobi in Barcelona, Spain

The Barcelona Olympic Organizing Committee and BRB Internacional produced an animated television series starring Cobi and Petra to promote the Games, titled The Cobi Troupe. The series was created under the creative and artistic direction of Mariscal, with a screenplay by Tricicle. A series of six comic albums were also released alongside the television series.

== Legacy ==
The Spanish fashion brand Tendam released a set of pajamas featuring Cobi during the 2024 Summer Olympics.

Barcelona has a Cobi fountain that was inaugurated on July 11, 1992, two weeks before the start of the Games. It was created by Mariscal, and he was not ultimately able to do his original idea of a sculpture that moves to different parts of the pool when spectators insert coins.

Preceded by Magique	Olympic mascot Cobi; Barcelona 1992	Succeeded by Håkon and Kristin
Preceded by Alpy	Paralympic mascot Petra; Barcelona 1992	Succeeded by Sondre
