= Hotel Silken Puerta América =

Hotel in Madrid, Spain

Coordinates: 40.4407°N 3.6700°W

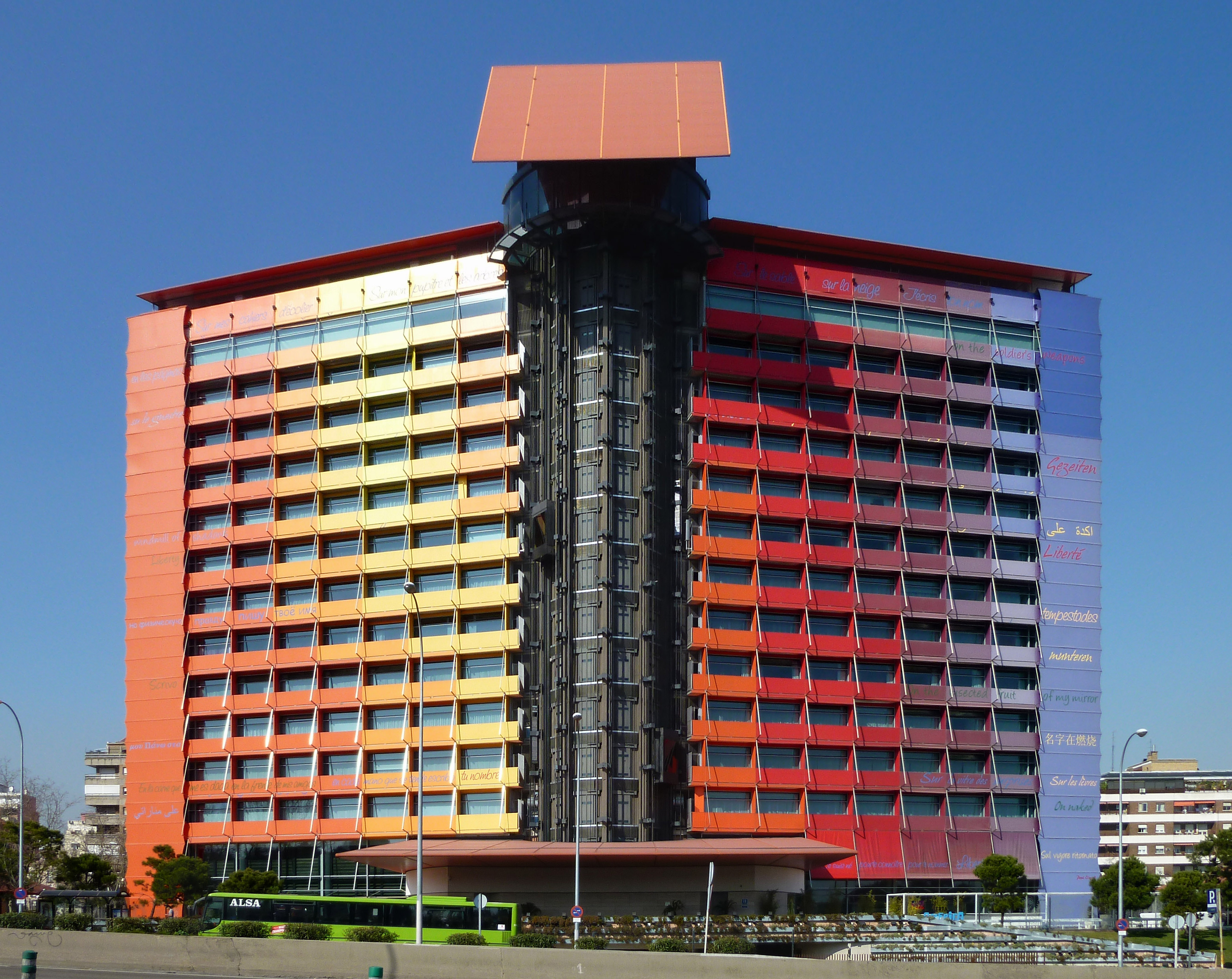

General information
- Location: Avenida de América, 41
- Town or city: Madrid, Spain

Hotel Silken Puerta América is a luxury Silken Hotel in Madrid, Spain. The exterior was designed by Jean Nouvel. The hotel's most defining characteristic is the design of each floor by a different architectural firm, including those of Norman Foster, Zaha Hadid, Ron Arad and Arata Isozaki.

== List of architects ==
Along with the exterior design by Nouvel, each floor was designed by a different architectural firm:

- Parking: Teresa Sapey
- Ground floor/lobby: John Pawson
- Floor 1: Zaha Hadid
- Floor 2: Norman Foster
- Floor 3: David Chipperfield
- Floor 4: Plasma Studio (Eva Castro) and Holger Kehne
- Floor 5: Victorio & Lucchino
- Floor 6: Marc Newson
- Floor 7: Ron Arad
- Floor 8: Kathryn Findlay
- Floor 9: Richard Gluckman
- Floor 10: Arata Isozaki
- Floor 11: Javier Mariscal and Fernando Salas
- Floor 12: Jean Nouvel

The restaurant was designed by Christian Liaigre, the bar by Marc Newson, and illumination of the hotel was carried out by Jason Bruges and Arnold Chan.
