= Blaze (Paralympic mascot) =

Mascot of the 1996 Summer Paralympics

Mascot of the 1996 Summer Paralympics (Atlanta)
- Creator: Trevor Stone Irvin
- Significance: A phoenix

Blaze, also known as Blaze the Phoenix, was the mascot of the 1996 Summer Paralympics in Atlanta. It was created by Atlanta artist Trevor Stone Irvin.

Blaze is a phoenix, a mythical bird that rises from ashes to experience a renewed life. The phoenix appears in the folklore of many global cultures and symbolizes renewal, perseverance and determination. The phoenix has also long been the symbol of Atlanta's rebirth after its devastation in the American Civil War. Blaze, with his bright colors, height and broad wing span, represents the personification of the will and determination of people with a disability to achieve full lives for themselves.

Blaze gained a solid fan base, and received more positive reception than the 1996 Olympic mascot, Izzy. Today, Blaze is the most recognizable symbol of disability sport in America and is the symbol of BlazeSports America, a disability sports nonprofit organization that is the direct legacy of the Games. In Georgia, as of 2022, motorists can purchase a car tag with a Blaze logo. Blaze is also the mascot for the Transplant Games of America.

Preceded by Sondre	Paralympic mascot Blaze; Atlanta 1996	Succeeded by Parabbit
