= Magique and Alpy =

Official mascot of the 1992 Winter Olympics in Albertville

Magique

Mascot of the 1992 Winter Olympics (Albertville)
- Creator: Philippe Mairesse
- Significance: A little imp in the shape of a star and a cube

Alpy

Mascot of the 1992 Winter Paralympics (Tignes and Albertville)
- Creator: Vincent Thiebaut
- Significance: The summit of the Grande Motte mountain in Tignes

Magique (Magic) and Alpy are the mascots of the 1992 Winter Olympics and Paralympics in Albertville.

== Characteristics ==
=== Magique ===
Magique is a little imp in the shape of a star and a cube. It is created by Philippe Mairesse and was presented in 1989. His star shape symbolizes dreams and imagination. His colors come from the French flag, with a red hat and a blue costume. Magique was the first mascot that was not an animal since the 1976 Winter Olympics. Several studies, financed by the Organising Committee (OCOG), were conducted to find a name for the mascot, but in the end none was chosen. However, on re-reading his brief, his creator realised that the word “magique” appeared several times and the OCOG decided to name the mascot accordingly.

The mascot had a pedagogical role: with the aim of informing the 7,924 Games volunteers, the OCOG opted for a computer-aided teaching programme. Magique appeared in the various teaching modules and games.

Originally, the chosen mascot was a Chamois, a mountain goat, created by illustrator Michel Pirus. This idea gave way to the star-shaped imp two years before the start of the Games.

=== Alpy ===
Alpy, designed by Vincent Thiebaut, represented the summit of the Grande Motte mountain in Tignes. Alpy was shown on a mono-ski to demonstrate its athleticism and the colours of white, green and blue were used to represent purity/snow, hope/nature and discipline/the lake.

== Notes ==
Preceded by Hodori	Olympic mascot Magique; Albertville 1992	Succeeded by Cobi
Preceded by Gomdoori	Paralympic mascot Alpy; Albertville 1992	Succeeded by Petra
