= Izzy's Quest for the Olympic Rings =

1995 action video game

- North American Genesis cover art
- Developer: Alexandria
- Publisher: U.S. Gold
- Platforms: Sega Genesis, Super Nintendo Entertainment System
- Release: NA: November 1995; EU: November 6, 1995
- Genre: Platformer
- Mode: Single-player

Izzy's Quest for the Olympic Rings is a 1995 platformer video game developed by Alexandria and published by U.S. Gold for the Sega Genesis and the Super Nintendo Entertainment System.

== Gameplay ==
Izzy's Quest for the Olympic Rings is a side-scrolling video game in which the player controls Izzy, the mascot of the 1996 Summer Olympics. When the player touches a "morphing star", Izzy changes shape and acquires a new power-up. Izzy can transform into a baseball batter capable of striking enemies, a hang-glider capable of flight, a rocket capable of space travel, a javelin capable of skewering enemies, and a fencer capable of slicing enemies. The goal of the game is to collect colorful rings and return them to Atlanta to light the Olympic flame.

== Development and release ==
In early 1994, British publisher U.S. Gold signed an exclusive licensing agreement with the Atlanta Committee for the 1996 Summer Olympics to develop video games tied to the event, including one based on its official mascot Izzy. Izzy's Quest for the Olympic Rings was contracted to Los Osos-based start-up Alexandria, which was a subsidiary of Creative Programming and Technology Ventures (CPTV). Alexandria was a young group of designers that included producer and programmer Matt Powers, who took on a leadership role starting with their first project Sylvester and Tweety in Cagey Capers. Powers was one of two programmers on teams consisting of only five to ten people. Some of the staff at Alexandria overlapped with another CPTV subsidiary, Oddworld Inhabitants, who later created the Oddworld series.

Alexandria became wholly owned by CPTV in November 1994. After strong initial sales of Sylvester and Tweety in Cagey Capers, CPTV projected a first quarter 1995 launch for Izzy's Quest for the Olympic Rings and other titles to avoid competition around Christmas 1994. SNES and Sega Genesis versions were reported for April 1995 and a Sega 32X version for June of that year. Some magazines pushed the 16-bit ports to May or June. In July, CPTV announced a "broad market release" of the game for fall 1995. The company finally settled on a launch for the week of November 6, 1995 for the SNES edition and the following week for the Genesis edition with plans to ship 35,000 copies for each console. The 32X version of the game never materialized. CPTV announced net losses for the first quarter of its fiscal year 1996 and corporate restructuring that ultimately led to the closure of Alexandria.

== Reception ==
Reception

Review scores
Publication	Score
Game Informer	5.75/10 (GEN)
Game Players	35% (GEN)
GamePro	3.625/5 (SNES/GEN)
Next Generation	2/5 (GEN)
Total!	36/100 (SNES)
Ação Games	3.3/5 (GEN)
Consoles +	80% (SNES)
Electronic Games	B+ (GEN)
Game Power	83/100 (GEN)
HobbyConsolas	80/100 (GEN)
Joypad	83% (SNES)
MAN!AC	60% (SNES)
MegaZone	87% (GEN)
Mega Force	83% (GEN)
Mega Fun	58% (SNES)
Video Games (DE)	56% (SNES)
VideoGames	7/10 (SNES/GEN)

Next Generation rated the Genesis version two stars out of five, finding that with the oversaturation of mascot platformers, the game is "another side-scrolling action game that leaves a bad taste in your mouth."

Game Informer gave an overall score of 5.75 out of 10, noting that the game is marketed for younger players, that the gameplay is easy, and that the game does not offer anything new or innovative. Game Informer concluded: "it captures the quality of Sonic the Hedgehog and promises the wholesomeness and entertainment of the Olympic Games themselves."

== See also ==
- List of Olympic video games
