= ELISAVA =

Academic institution in Barcelona

Coordinates: 41°22′43.46″N 2°10′32.91″E

ELISAVA Barcelona School of Design and Engineering
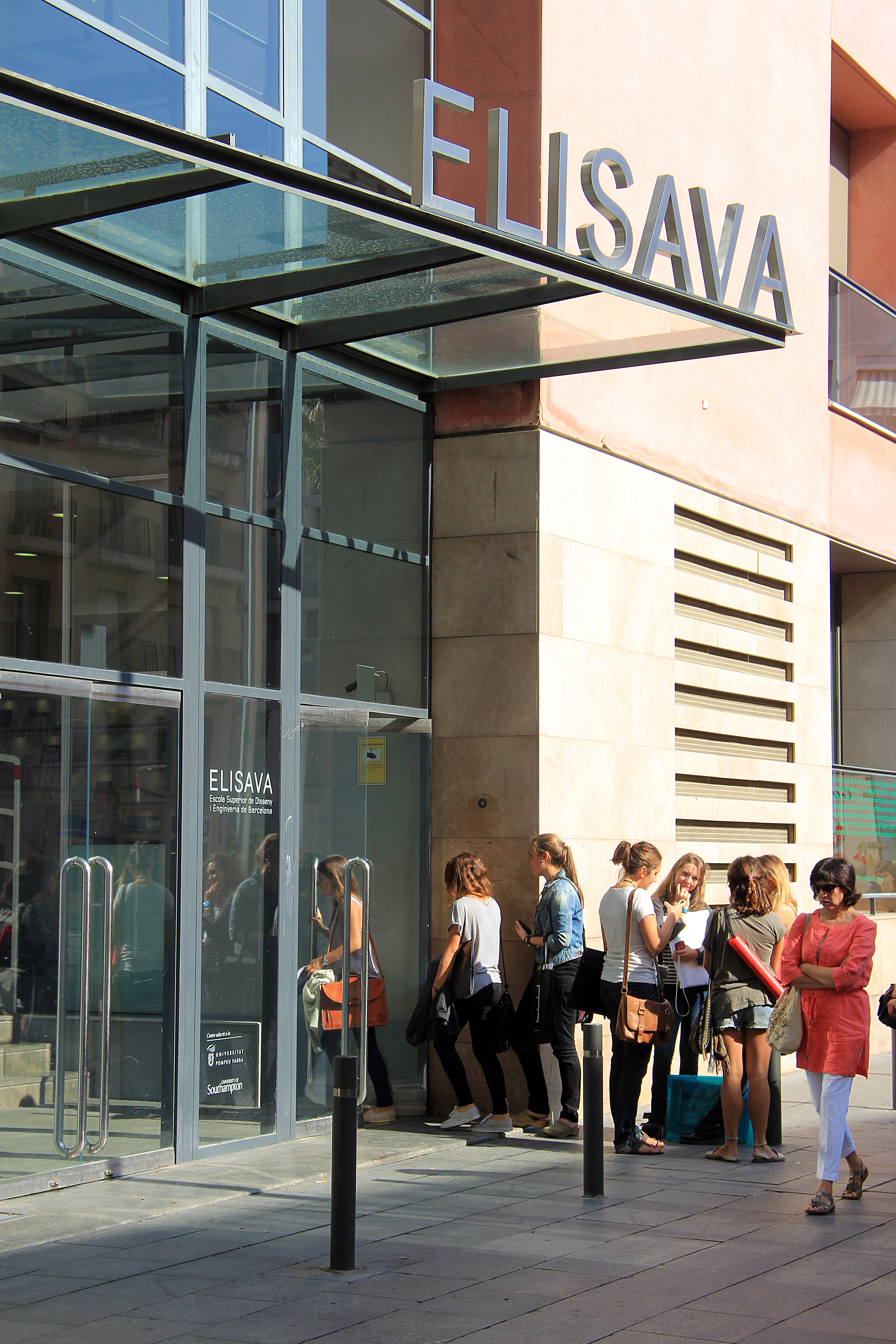
- Elisava
- Type: Private
- Established: 1961
- Students: 1,868
- Location: Barcelona, Spain
- Campus: Urban
- Website: elisava.net

ELISAVA Faculty of Design and Engineering is an educational center for design and engineering affiliated with the University of Vic. Founded in 1961 in Barcelona, it is the first design school in Spain. Its campus is located on La Rambla in Barcelona, where around 2,200 students and more than 800 professors coexist.

The school was affiliated with Pompeu Fabra University from 1995 to 2021.

In 2000, ELISAVA won a National Innovation and Design Award. In 2013, the magazine Domus ranked it among the top design and architecture schools in Europe.

== History ==
=== Origins ===
Founded in Barcelona in 1961, ELISAVA was launched to create a new venue for teaching design, as part of the CIC's Cultural Institution Foundation. The school gradually came to orient itself around theoretical and practical training when tackling and resolving design problems, as opposed to repeating problems that have already been solved, such as in artisan education. In 1997, the school added a programme in industrial design engineering, and in 1998, it launched its architecture programme.

=== 1991, master’s and postgraduate programmes ===
ELISAVA's postgraduate workshops got underway in 1990 with the aid of outstanding designers such as Francesco Binfarré, Achile Castiglioni, Isao Hosoe, Santiago Miranda, Jonathan de Pas and Denis Santachiara. The postgraduate workshops continued until they became postgraduate and master's programmes in academic year 1991–1992 as part of the cooperation agreement that ELISAVA signed with the University of Barcelona. Through ELISAVA's affiliation with the Pompeu Fabra University (UPF), today, it offers around 20 master's and 40 postgraduate programmes, and related professional practice in all areas of design and engineering in conjunction with the UPF's IDEC (Institute of Continuing Education).

=== 2003, private foundation: ELISAVA University School ===
To promote the school and make it more autonomous, in 2003 the CIC's Cultural Foundation set up the private foundation, the ELISAVA University School. Its original mission was to promote education, knowledge, research, development, innovation and the use of new technologies in the fields of science, technology, business and the arts; to boost and consolidate the quality of the degree programmes and services offered; to increase the range of continuing education programmes and to enhance student job placement; to adapt the range of programmes and services to the needs of an ever-changing society and business world; to attain international outreach; to contribute to the social, cultural and economic progress of society; and to foster the personal development of the members of the ELISAVA community.

=== 2009, integration into the new European university framework ===
In 2009, ELISAVA's educational programme became fully integrated into the European Higher Education Area by offering its bachelor's degree in design, its bachelor's degree in industrial design engineering and its bachelor's degree in building engineering for the first time. Prior to that, it had been offering a University Master's in Communication and Design since 2008.

=== Previous campus locations ===
ELISAVA's current modern campus was preceded by various locations, due to its rising popularity and steady growth in the number of students and instructors. The current campus has excellent study and research facilities, special tools for modeling, workspace for students, lecture facilities, conference rooms, and spacious exhibition facilities.

=== Expansion ===
In October 2024, ELISAVA extended its presence beyond the city of Barcelona for the first time, opening a new campus in Madrid. Elisava Madrid currently offers 3 master's degrees.

== Fields of knowledge ==
ELISAVA offers educational programmes in:

- Graphic Design and Communication
- Product Design
- Industrial Engineering Design
- Interior Space Design
- Architecture
- Fashion
- Design Strategy

== Network of international relations ==
ELISAVA has agreements with more than 60 universities in Europe, the United States, Latin America, Asia and Australia. It is a member of the Cumulus network, which brings together more than 100 renowned institutions from all over the world to promote international cooperation. It is also a member of the International Association for Exchange of Students for Technical Experience (IAESTE). It works with the Council on International Educational Exchange, a non-profit organisation designed by the U.S. State Department with the mission of managing international student exchange programmes. It also participates in the LifelongLearning/Erasmus programme promoted by the European Union to bring students closer to Europe and Europe closer to students.

== Innovation and business ==
=== Relations with businesses ===
ELISAVA is a university that is interested in generating and transferring knowledge to companies, forging direct links with the business world and generating real-life learning situations for its students. To date, it has conducted projects and reached agreements with companies and institutions like 3M, Adobe Systems Incorporated, Apple Inc, BMW, Decathlon, Desigual, DuPont, Ericsson, Fabrica (Benetton), Generalitat de Catalunya, Grupo Agbar, Henkel, Hewlett-Packard, Hospital Clínic de Barcelona, Iguzzini, IKEA, LABCO, ICFO, La Caixa, Lego, Mango, Philips, Roca Sanitarios, Sony, Vueling Airlines Fundació Vila Casas, Happy Pills and Smart Design.

=== Applied research ===
ELISAVA conducts research projects applied to design and engineering with the goal of pursuing innovation in business. The research is organised into three main strands: social innovation, innovation in new materials and new manufacturing technologies, and innovation in business. It conducts projects in the fields of visual communication, product design and engineering, mobility and transports, retail space, new materials, sustainability and healthcare. It has worked with the Pasqual Maragall Foundation, ASCER, ALSTOM/ FGC, Rucker-Lypsa, Bayer Material Science and Fabrica.

== Temes de Disseny magazine ==
Since 1986, ELISAVA has published the magazine ELISAVA Temes de Disseny, a trilingual scholarly research publication which debates issues related to design and its relationship with technology, communication, culture and the economy. https://web.archive.org/web/20131023025710/http://tdd.elisava.net/

== Alumni ==
The ELISAVA Alumni Association was founded in 2003 as Elisava Professionals (EP). It is a non-profit organisation resulting from the commitment and effort of a group of students and alumni who wished to disseminate and promote the identity and values of the individuals who make up the ELISAVA community. In 2012, the association embarked upon a new stage to match its new name, Elisava Alumni, and it organised a competition to design its new corporate image. The winning submission, designed by the alumnus Albert Ibanyez, was awarded three Laus prizes organised Foment de les Arts i el Disseny in the categories of Graphic Design-Naming (silver), Entities (silver) and Graphic Design-Logo (bronze). The corporate image of Elisava Alumni harks back to the 12th century banner of Saint Otto, which contains one of the first female signatures in Catalan: “Elisava me fecit” (Elisava made me). Spanish-German popstar Álvaro Soler is an alumnus of ELISAVA, having studied design engineering from 2009 to 2013.

== Activities ==
ELISAVA promotes and disseminates knowledge related to design and engineering through a busy schedule of activities. In 1991, it began to organise and host a variety of activities as part of Primavera del Disseny, a biannual design fair consisting of a theoretical reflection on the different issues being posed in the world of design.

ELISAVA has hosted a number of conferences related to the different fields of knowledge taught at the school. In 2012, it hosted the European EPIC, Ethnographic Praxis in Industry Conference, on ethnographic research in industry. In 2013, it hosted the first edition of Entretipos, a series of workshops and lectures on typography; the international web design conference WebVisions; and the fourth edition of Algomad, the seminar on generative methods in architecture and design.

ELISAVA regularly welcomes international lecturers and leading professionals from different fields, such as Zaha Hadid, Philippe Starck, Andrea Branzi, Ronan Bouroullec, Xavier Mariscal, or Lidewij Edelkoort.
