= Håkon, Kristin and Sondre =

1994 Winter Olympics mascots

Håkon and Kristin
- Håkon (right) and Kristin (left)

Mascots of the 1994 Winter Olympics (Lillehammer)
- Creator: Kari and Werner Grossman
- Significance: Two modern children wearing Viking clothes

Sondre

Mascot of the 1994 Winter Paralympics (Lillehammer)
- Creator: Tor Lindrupsen and Janne Solem
- Significance: Amputated troll

Håkon and Kristin were the official mascots of the 1994 Winter Olympics, and Sondre was the official mascot of the 1994 Winter Paralympics, both held in Lillehammer, Norway.

Håkon and Kristin are two happy Norwegian children, a boy and a girl, both dressed in Viking clothes. Although they wear medieval clothes referring to their historical roots, they are the children of today and express interests and visions of youth as environmental awareness. The mascots are created by author Kari Werner and her husband illustrator Werner Grossmann from an idea of architect Javier Ramirez Campuzano, who had designed the corporate identity of the Mexico Pavilion for the 1994 Winter Olympic Games.

Eight pairs of Norwegian children, each representing a region of the country, were selected from about 10,000 subscribers aged 10 to 11 years old to play the mascots.

Two venues of the 1994 Winter Olympics located side by side, had the same name as the Mascots: the Håkons Hall and Kristins Hall.

Sondre is the first Paralympic Winter Games mascot with a visible physical disability. The design is based on Scandinavian folklore trolls and was created following a national design competition in schools. Children presented their drawings with Janne Solem’s work being selected and developed further by Norwegian artist Tor Lindurpsen. Sondre the troll is a skier with one leg, who is athletic and passion for winter sport. His name was chosen as a reference of the national figure Sondre Norheim, the innovator of modern alpine skiing.

== Historical basis ==
The mascots' names refer to historical figures from the thirteenth century whose fate is closely linked to Norway and the protagonist that Lillehammer region area had on that conflict: Håkon IV who was the king of Norway between 1217 and 1263 and Princess Kristin Sverrisdóttir, his aunt. They lived in Norway during a time of a conflict between the Birkebeiner and the Bagler clans. When Håkon Håkonson was a small child he had to escape Lillehammer through the mountains with his supporters due to threatening by the Baglers. The Princess of the Birkebeiner, Kristin Sverrisdottir, married meanwhile the chief of the Baglers Filippus Simonsson in the sake of peace between the two groups.

Preceded by Cobi	Olympic mascot Håkon and Kristin; Lillehammer 1994	Succeeded by Izzy
Preceded by Petra	Paralympic mascot Sondre; Lillehammer 1994	Succeeded by Blaze
