= BlazeSports America =

US non-profit organization

- Founded: 1993
- Founder: Legacy organization of the 1996 Atlanta Paralympic Games
- Type: non-profit 501(c)(3) organization
- Location: 535 North McDonough Street Decatur, GA 30030
- Website: blazesports.org

BlazeSports America is a national nonprofit 501(c)(3) organization based in Decatur, Georgia, that provides sport and physical activity opportunities for youth and adults with physical disabilities.

== History ==
BlazeSports America, Inc. was founded as the U.S. Disabled Athletes Fund, Inc. (USDAF). It was established in 1993 to become the legacy of the 1996 Paralympic Games held in Atlanta, Georgia. In 1998, a model program was rolled out in Georgia in partnership with the Georgia Recreation and Park Association to bring community-based disability sports programs to communities across the state. The BlazeSports Georgia activities were funded, in part, by a grant from the State of Georgia. In 2002, in partnership with the National Recreation and Park Association, BlazeSports launched a national program offered through BlazeSports clubs and affiliates. The organization now bears the name of the highly popular Atlanta Paralympic Games mascot, Blaze. BlazeSports America is a chapter of Disabled Sports USA.

== Current programming ==
BlazeSports America has a network of local programs delivered in conjunction with community agencies and organizations in Georgia. Sports camps, clinics, workshops, tournaments and competitions are offered by BlazeSports America. Additionally, BlazeSports America has organized a National Disability Sport Conference annually each spring to train coaches, officials, local service providers, and leaders in the field of Paralympic Sport.

Seven BlazeSports staffers traveled to Haiti in June 2011 to strengthen and support Haiti's programs for disabled athletes.

== Mascot ==
BlazeSports' most prominent symbol is its mascot Blaze. Blaze is a phoenix, a mythical bird that rises from ashes to experience a renewed life. The phoenix appears in Egyptian, Arabian, Chinese, Russian and native American lore and in all instances symbolizes strength, vision, inspiration and survival. Blaze was created by Trevor Stone Irvin of Irvin Productions in Atlanta.

The phoenix was an ideal mascot for the 1996 Atlanta Paralympic Games and later for BlazeSports America. It has long been the symbol of Atlanta’s rebirth after its devastation in the American Civil War. But most importantly, it is the personification of the will, perseverance and determination of youth and adults with physical disability to achieve full and productive lives.

Blaze, with his bright colors, height and broad wing span, reflects the traits, identified in a focus group of athletes with disability, as those they believed best represented the drive to succeed of persons with physical disability who pursue sports as recreation and as a competitive endeavor.

== See also ==
- United States at the Paralympics
- United States Olympic Committee
