= Hodori and Gomdoori =

Mascot of the 1988 Summer Olympics

Hodori

Mascot of the 1986 Asian Games and 1988 Summer Olympics
- Creator: Kim Hyun
- Significance: Amur tiger

Gomdoori

Mascots of the 1986 Asian Games and 1988 Summer Paralympics
- Creator: Lee Yun Soo
- Significance: Two Asian black bears

- Hodori and Gomdoori
- Hangul: 호돌이, 곰두리
- RR: Hodori, Gomduri
- MR: Hodori, Komduri

Hodori (Korean: 호돌이) and Gomdoori (Korean: 곰두리) were the official mascots of the 1986 Asian Games, the 1988 Summer Olympics and 1988 Summer Paralympics.

== Characteristics ==
Hodori and Gomdoori were designed by Kim Hyun and Lee Yun Soo respectively as an amicable Amur tiger and Asian black bear respectively.

=== Hodori ===
"Ho" (호) is derived from the Korean word for tiger ("horangi", 호랑이), and "dori" (돌이) is a diminutive for boys in Korean. The name Hodori was chosen from 2,295 suggestions sent in by the public.

There was a female version of the mascot named Hosuni.

=== Gomdoori ===
According to Korean ancestral culture, bears are known for their courage and wisdom, which is reflected by the existence of two sister constellations: Ursa Major and Ursa Minor. The two bears chosen as mascots are of a species known as the Asian black bear. This practice was common on the Korean peninsula and was marked by the white V-shaped chest mark. The two chosen mascots are brothers tied by a rope to the leg; this demonstrates the brotherhood, guidance, coherent and coexistent cooperation and relationship that the Olympic and Paralympic Games would have now: dreamt of by the Organizing Committee of this edition of the Paralympics. They also represented achievements and camaraderie recorded during the event. The name chosen for the mascots was Gomdoori.

== See also ==
- Tigers in Korean culture

Preceded by Hidy and Howdy	Olympic mascot Hodori; Seoul 1988	Succeeded by Magique
Preceded by Dan D. Lion	Paralympic mascot Gomdoori; Seoul 1988	Succeeded by Alpy
