= Alberto Lasarte =

Spanish football manager

Personal information
- Full name: Alberto Javier Lasarte Ruiz
- Date of birth: 8 May 1981 (age 45)
- Place of birth: Jaén, Spain

Team information
- Current team: Almería (youth coordinator)

Managerial career
- Years: Team
- 2001–2010: Jaén (youth)
- 2010–2011: Jaén B
- 2011–2014: Villacarrillo
- 2014–2015: Linares (youth)
- 2017: Linares
- 2018–2023: Almería (youth)
- 2023–2025: Almería B
- 2023: Almería (caretaker)

Alberto Javier Lasarte Ruiz (born 8 May 1981) is a Spanish football manager, currently the youth coordinator of UD Almería.

== Coaching career ==
Born in Jaén, Andalusia, Lasarte began working in the youth categories of hometown side Real Jaén, and was in charge of the reserves in the 2010–11 season. In June 2011, he left the club to take over Villacarrillo CF in Primera Andaluza.

Lasarte led the club to a first-ever promotion to Tercera División in 2012, and renewed his contract on 26 June 2013, after a 6th place finish in the debut campaign in the fourth tier. On 12 May 2014, he was named sporting director of Linares Deportivo.

On 14 March 2017, Lasarte was appointed manager of Linares, replacing sacked Miguel Rivera. On 4 April, after just three matches, he was replaced by Juan Ferrando and returned to the director role, now with the youth sides.

In 2018, Lasarte joined UD Almería to work as manager of the Juvenil B squad, being also an analyst of Fran Fernández in the first team. He later worked with the Cadete A team and in the scouting area of the club, before being named in charge of the Juvenil A on 24 July 2022.

Lasarte took the club to the Final of the Copa del Rey Juvenil for the first time ever, losing it to Real Madrid. On 7 June 2023, he was appointed manager of the reserves in Tercera Federación.

On 29 September 2023, Lasarte became the caretaker manager of Almería's first team in La Liga, in the place of Vicente Moreno. His first professional match in charge occurred two days later, a 3–3 home draw against Granada CF.

On 8 October 2023, after another match in charge of the main squad (a 3–0 loss to Athletic Bilbao), Lasarte returned to his role with the B-team after the appointment of Gaizka Garitano as manager. The following 22 July, after leading the reserves to a promotion to Segunda Federación, he renewed his contract for two years.

On 5 November 2025, Lasarte left the role of Almería B manager after being replaced by José María Salmerón; he remained at the club in the youth structure.

== Managerial statistics ==
As of 6 October 2023

Managerial record by team and tenure
| Team | Nat | From | To | Record | | | | | | | | Ref |
| Team | Nat | From | To | G | W | D | L | GF | GA | GD | Win % | Ref |
|---|---|---|---|---|---|---|---|---|---|---|---|---|
| Jaén B | (Spain) | 1 July 2010 | 10 June 2011 | 34 | 15 | 13 | 6 | 78 | 44 | +34 | 44.12 | |
| Villacarrillo | (Spain) | 10 June 2011 | 12 May 2014 | 110 | 61 | 26 | 23 | 204 | 109 | +95 | 55.45 | |
| Linares | (Spain) | 14 March 2017 | 4 April 2017 | 3 | 0 | 1 | 2 | 2 | 4 | −2 | 0.00 | |
| Almería B | (Spain) | 7 June 2023 | present | 3 | 1 | 2 | 0 | 3 | 2 | +1 | 33.33 | |
| Almería (caretaker) | (Spain) | 29 September 2023 | 8 October 2023 | 2 | 0 | 1 | 1 | 3 | 6 | −3 | 0.00 | |
| Total | | | | 152 | 77 | 43 | 32 | 290 | 165 | +125 | 50.66 | — |
