= Vinçon =

Vinçon is a surname. Notable people with the surname include:

- Serge Vinçon (1949–2007), French politician
- Thibault Vinçon (born 1976), French actor
