= Ajlan & Brothers =

Clothing manufacturer

AJLAN & BROTHERS عجلان واخوانه
- Company type: Public
- Industry: Clothes
- Founded: 1979; 47 years ago
- Headquarters: Riyadh, Saudi Arabia
- Key people: Ajlan bin Abdel Aziz Al-Ajlan – Chairman
- Products: Yashmagh, Ghutra, Garment (Thobe), and Underwear
- Website: http://www.ajlanbros.com/

Ajlan & Brothers manufactures classic menswear, ready-made clothes, and winter clothes in the Kingdom of Saudi Arabia and Persian Gulf region. The company was established in 1979 with a head office in Riyadh.

Ajlan Al Ajlan was appointed chairman of the Riyadh Chamber of Commerce and Industry in 2018. He is a Saudi businessperson, establishing Ajlan & Bros in 1979 and building it into one of the largest investment and commercial groups in the Kingdom. Al Ajlan is chairman of Ajlan & Bros, which has more than 9,000 employees across 10 companies. He sits on the board of various other textile, real estate, and investment companies, as well as charity organizations.

== History ==
Ajlan & Bros. was launched a businession 1979 and was incorporated as a partnership on 1994. It converted to a closed-end joint stock company in 2005.

== Activities ==
Ajlan & Brothers is known for men's headwear, such as Yashmagh and Ghutra, and for readymade cloths (dress and underwear). The company manufactures most of its products in its own factories, which are later sold to wholesalers and retailers in Saudi Arabia, UAE, Bahrain, Qatar and Kuwait. The company owns a proprietary sales network, and distributors and agents in Saudi Arabia sell the products to Yemen, Syria, Jordan, Libya and Egypt.

Ajlan & Brothers created 45 branch and 200 wholesale points in Saudi Arabia and the Arab States of the Persian Gulf, which counted in the Kingdom of Saudi Arabia and the Persian Gulf.

=== Commercial trademarks ===
Ajlan & Brothers owns several commercial trademarks in the Kingdom including: Alsami (yashmagh & ghutra), Progeh (yashmagh, ghutra & underwear), Botchiny (yashmagh & ghutra), Renaih (yashmagh & ghutra), Biyajeh (yashmagh & ghutra), Abdulatif Alattar (ghutra), Pioneer (underwear), Progeh (underwear), Drosh (dress & underwear), Drosh V(underwear), Rocheir (underwear), AlSami (underwear)

Ajlan & Brothers company is licensed to use several commercial trademarks in KSA, Kuwait, UAE, Qatar, Bahrain, Oman and Jordan covering Yashmagh and Ghutra products, including: Ferrari (yashmagh & ghutra), Maserati (yashmagh & ghutra), Aston Martin (yashmagh & ghutra), Bogatti (yashmagh & ghutra), Lamborghini (yashmagh & ghutra), Missoni (yashmagh & ghutra), Iceberg (yashmagh & ghutra), Versace (yashmagh & ghutra)

=== Governance ===
- Sheikh Ajlan bin Abdul Aziz Al Ajlan, board chairman (1979 – to date)
- Sheikh Saad bin Abdul Aziz Al Ajlan, deputy chairman (1980 – deceased)
- Sheikh Mohammad bin Abdul Aziz Al Ajlan, deputy chairman (1981 – to date)
- Sheikh Fahad bin Abdul Aziz Al Ajlan, deputy general manager (1991 – to date)
