= Catalan Sheepdog =

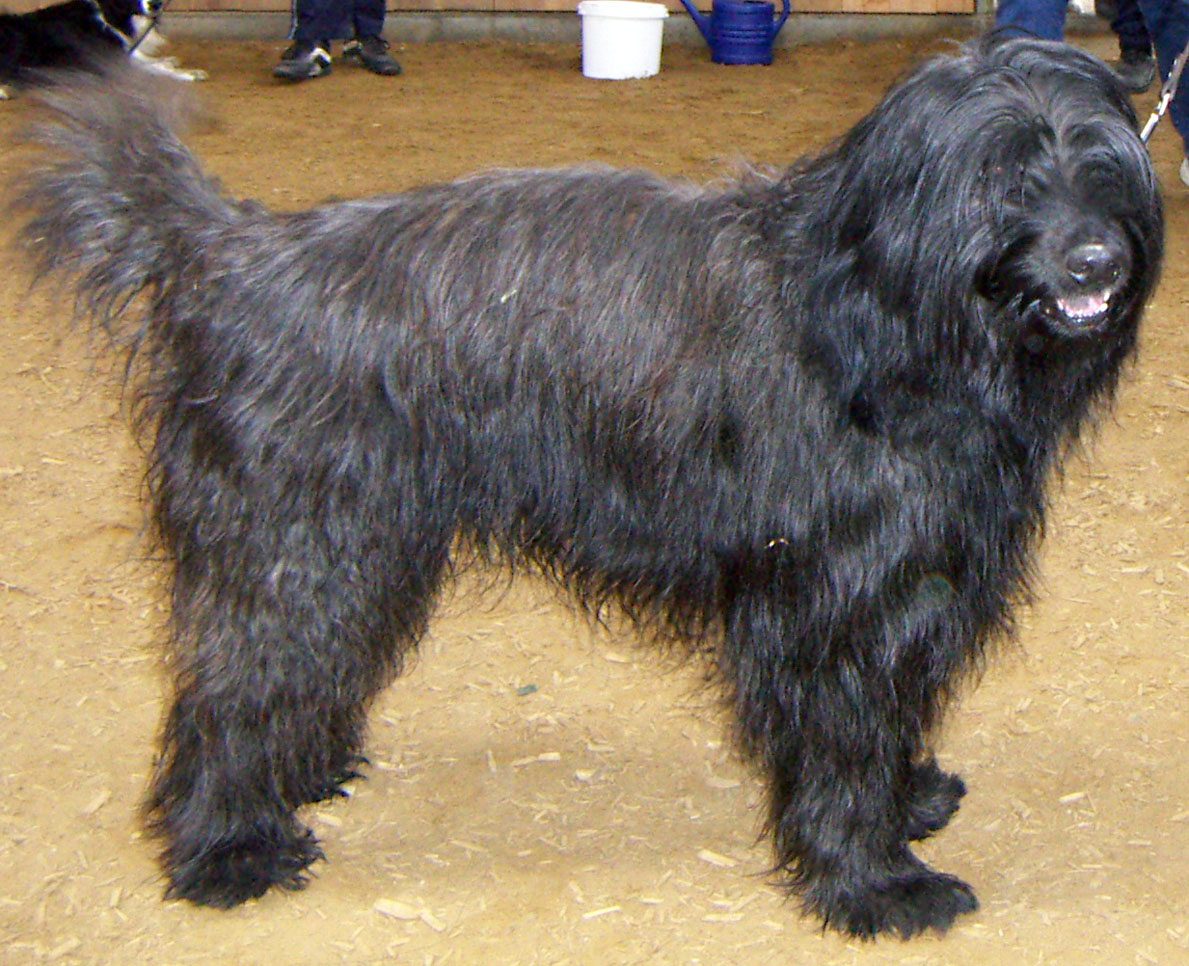

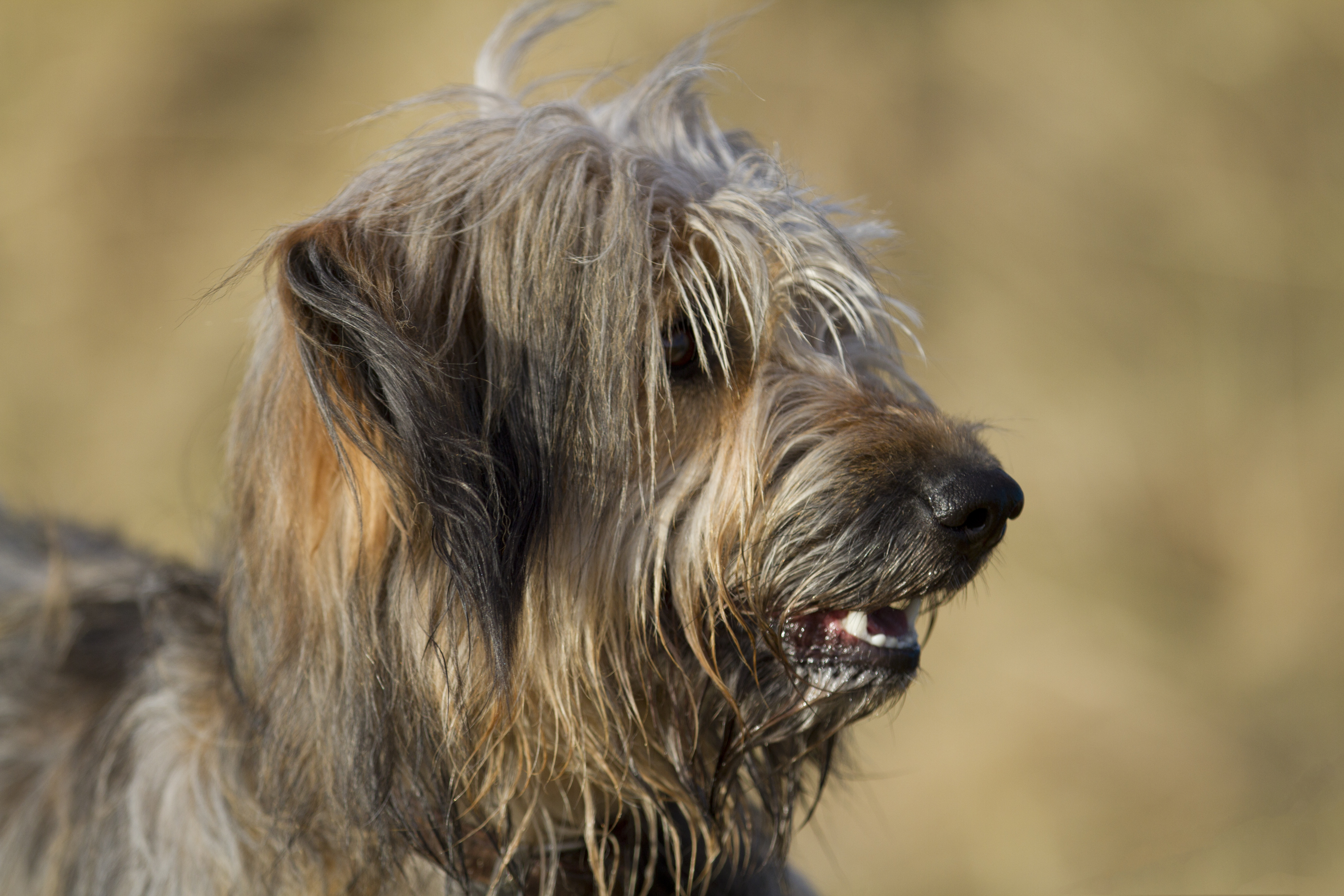
- Other names: Catalonian Shepherd; Gos d'Atura; Gos d'Atura Català; Perro de Pastor Catalán
- Origin: Spain
Traits
Height	Males	47–55 cm (19–22 in)
	Females	45–53 cm (18–21 in)
Kennel club standards
- Real Sociedad Canina de España: standard
- Fédération Cynologique Internationale: standard

The Catalan Sheepdog (Catalan: Gos d'Atura Català, Spanish: Pastor Catalán) is a Spanish breed of herding dog. It originated in valleys and foothills of the Pyrenees of Catalonia, but has spread throughout Catalonia and much of Spain; there are breed societies in Finland, France, Germany and Holland.

It was traditionally used to herd livestock, particularly horses and sheep. In the twenty-first century it may also be kept as a companion animal.

== History ==
The Gos d'Atura derives from the former wide and variable population of long-haired herding dogs in the Pyrenees, from which the Pyrenean Shepherd and the Euskal Artzain Txakurra also derive. It was recognised as a breed at the time of the formation of the Real Sociedad Central para el Fomento de las Razas Caninas en España in 1911. The first breed standard was drawn up in 1929, and was adopted by the Fédération Cynologique Internationale when it definitively accepted the breed in 1954. A new standard was prepared in 1982, and modified at the time of the formation of the Club del Gos d’Atura Català in 1984.

== Characteristics ==
Height at the withers is in the range 47 to 55 cm for dogs, and 45 to 53 cm for bitches. Their coat is long and either flat or slightly wavy, and ranges from fawn to dark sable and light to dark grey. There is also a short-haired variety of this breed, but it is nearly extinct.

=== Size and weight ===
Height at withers: 47−55 cm and 20−25 kg for male dogs; from 45 to 53 cm and 17–21 kg for females.

=== Hair and hair color ===
Long and limp and a little curled. Seen from afar the dog seems to be unicolour and may have lighter shadings at the limbs. When seen close up, it is noticeable that the colour comes from a mixture of hairs of different colour shades: fawn, brown more or less reddish, grey and black. Long, flat, or very slightly wavy, rough with abundant undercoat on the whole posterior third of the body. On the head a beard, moustaches, tuft and eyebrows which do not affect sight can be noticed. Tail well covered with hair as are all four limbs. It is noticeable that during moulting a typical phenomenon may be observed: it occurs in two periods. First of all it affects the coat on the front part, giving the impression of two halves with different coats; then moults the hind part of the dog and everything becomes uniform again.

=== Temperament ===
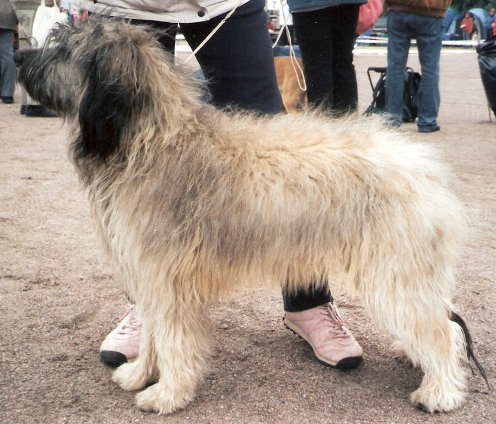
Catalan Sheepdog, fawn-white coat

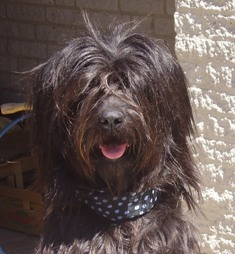
Catalan Sheepdog portrait

This breed is used for herding and as a pet dog. Because of its intelligence, the Gos D'Atura, like most sheepdogs, is easy to train. This cheerful dog excels at dog-sports, such as agility and doggy-dance. In spite of its appearance, this courageous dog is also used as a watch-dog. An "all-around-dog" and great companion.

They guard sheep without needing instruction. Enough (outdoor) activity and distraction makes this dog a quiet and well-balanced home companion. This breed is appropriate for people with firm techniques and who can give the dog enough exercise. Early socialization is important, particularly if the dog will be around children. The dogs defend their family and become attached to it.

== Health ==
Catalan sheepdogs are prone to hip dysplasia. Their average life span is 12 to 14 years.
