= Izzy (mascot) =

Official mascot of the 1996 Summer Olympics in Atlanta

- 1996 Summer Olympics character
- Official artwork
- First appearance: 1992
- Created by: John Ryan
- Portrayed by: Mark Evans (original Whatizit); LaTara Bullock
- Voiced by: Justin Shenkarow

In-universe information
- Aliases: Whatizit; Hi-Rez
- Species: Alien

Izzy (previously called Whatizit and Hi-Rez) is a blue, slug-like blob that is the official mascot of the 1996 Atlanta Summer Olympics. It was unveiled to widespread ridicule at the closing ceremony of the 1992 Summer Olympics in Barcelona, and continued to be mocked throughout its period of public usage, even after a redesign in 1993. The character was the first computer-generated mascot in Olympic history, and has the ability to morph into different forms when viewed in certain digital or video formats. Notably, Izzy does not represent an animal or human figure or anything with national significance, a departure from Olympic mascot convention.

== Conception and introduction ==
In 1991, the Atlanta Committee for the Olympic Games (ACOG) began to develop the Olympics mascot. The ACOG solicited ideas from citizens, whose leading mascot suggestion was a peach, but limited the actual contest to professionals, organizing a competition between twenty design firms. Due to the ACOG's contest guidelines that denied the artist any payment or rights, most design firms dropped out. Famed designer Milton Glaser, known for the "I Love New York" logo, said he was "appalled" and accused the Olympic Committee of trying "to exploit graphic designers".

In the end, ACOG received a total of 11 submissions including a peanut, gopher named Goldie, a gorilla from Zoo Atlanta, and an anthropomorphic flame/phoenix. Participants included Cabbage Patch Kids creator Xavier Roberts and University of Georgia mascot designer Tom Sapp. In an unceremonious singlehanded decision, a blue computer-drawn blob named "Hi-Rez" (later Izzy) was quickly chosen by ACOG's head organizer, Billy Payne. Some committee members were shocked by his bizarre choice but did not interfere, with one later saying, "You didn't question Billy. He had already done the unthinkable: He had brought the Games to Atlanta when nobody thought there was a chance. Who am I to question his choice?" Payne later said his decision was based not on design but on the blue mascot's computer-generated development, which he felt was "taking over the entire entertainment industry" with films like Jurassic Park and Total Recall.

=== Design ===
Izzy, then called "Hi-Rez", had been submitted by John Ryan, an Atlanta animator from the DESIGNefx firm. Ryan was immediately tasked with creating many athlete versions (javelin, wrestling, etc.) of the character, and recalls "a period of all-nighters". At the time, he was in his mid-40s and had previously run an animation company with his wife Joyce N. Ryan, an academically trained graphic designer who pivoted toward computer drawing in the late 1980s and had recently founded the first computer graphics program at Washington University before moving to Atlanta in 1991. His inspiration was for a non-gendered creature that could transform into anything, symbolizing Atlanta as a city of the future. "The idea was to inspire the imagination", Ryan later said.

"We had so many things to do. Were we raising enough money? Were the stadiums going to be built in time? How are we going to train 50,000 volunteers? All of those had enormously higher importance than the mascot."
– Billy Payne, CEO of the Atlanta Olympics committee

=== Debut ===
The character was first introduced at the 1992 Summer Olympics in Barcelona, depicted as the life-sized costume worn by Mark Evans, a cheerleader from the University of North Carolina. The mascot's reveal was received negatively by viewers and members of the ACOG itself. Committee members later remembered, "My heart dropped into my stomach" and "the name, Whatizit, was almost worse than the character itself" due to its nonstandard, unspaced spelling that was unintuitive and hard to parse. Whatizit's design and name were the subject of widespread criticism primarily for their utter lack of connection to Atlanta, and also for their confusing nature.

Atlanta natives wanted to present a distinct identity of their city to the international audience, and were perplexed to be summed up by a confusing blob. "When you think about Atlanta now, you think about winning teams like the Braves in 1995, you think about Outkast, you think about films made here. You didn't have that yet. Atlanta had been searching for an identity. It was sort of like a bigger Charlotte" said Michelle Hiskey in 2016, a former reporter who covered the 1996 Olympics. The Atlanta-based reporter Kevin Sack wrote in The New York Times that it was "precisely Izzy's nothingness that has unwittingly made him an apt symbol for this Olympic city. When officials with the Atlanta Committee for the Olympic Games playfully named the creation Whatizit, it seemingly did not occur to them that the sociologists and scribes of the world would soon be asking the same question about Atlanta."

=== Redesign ===
The ACOG collaborated with Parade for a poll to rename the character. The most submitted name was "Kirby", but the ACOG chose not to use it as that name was already used by a trademarked mascot, instead opting for the second most popular name, "Izzy". The ACOG enlisted marketers and a series of children's focus groups to guide the character in a physical redesign, which resulted in him gaining a nose and losing his "tail", which was drawn in a way that seemed like it symbolized flatulence to some viewers. With a wider frame, Izzy appeared more youthful.

== Appearances ==
Hundreds of people tried out to be "Izzy" performers in the 20 life-sized costumes that were produced, and the selected group was given training in proper behavior, such as standing near Coca-Cola but not Pepsi. The costumes were 22 pounds, and performers entered through the top of Izzy's mouth to put them on. Removal required two people, and performers took turns wearing it every 30 minutes to minimize health risks from heat exposure. Few of the fans inside the costumes actually worked, leading to dehydration and other difficulties among performers. The Izzy costumes quickly deteriorated, with many lightening bolt eyebrows cracking off and the Olympic rings around his shoes breaking.

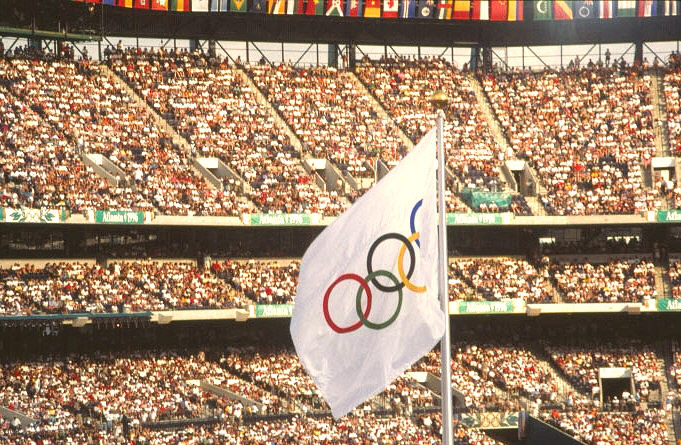
The Olympic flag waves at the 1996 Games

ACOG banned Izzy from both the opening and the closing ceremonies due to risk of causing distractions and "security concerns". In the days leading up to the Games, Izzy initially attempted to walk through the park, but was eventually given a golf cart after being repeatedly mobbed by people. It was called the "Izzymobile" and guarded by four staffers as the character traveled. In one instance a group of drunk men attempted to attack Izzy. After the Centennial Olympic Park bombing killed one and injured 111 people on June 27, Izzy halted public appearances with spectators except for ticketed sponsors.

Viewers were confused when the character seemed to rarely appear during the Games. Two days after the opening ceremony — which featured pickup trucks, Muhammad Ali lighting the torch, and a performance of Georgia On My Mind by Gladys Knight — the Associated Press wrote of Izzy, "Was he run over by one of the pickups and left for roadkill outside the stadium? Is he still waiting for a shuttle bus? Was he held hostage by Gumby?". During the USA–Lithuania men's basketball game, Izzy appeared on the court at the Georgia Dome holding a sign that said "Here I Iz."

== Merchandise and media ==
Izzy was liked better by children than adults. QVC network sold out of more than 1000 Izzy dolls within minutes. Stuffed Izzys were sold at 13 Toys "R" Us locations around Atlanta, and he appeared on the Lucky Charms cereal box and the Today show. ACOG earned about $100 million in royalties from licensing on all Olympic merchandise, an estimated 15% of which was Izzy merchandise according to one employee's estimate.

ACOG commissioned an animated television special entitled Izzy's Quest For Olympic Gold to promote Izzy, investing approximately hundreds of thousands of dollars to create a 30-minute program. It was produced by Film Roman and shown on Turner Network Television about three times before the games, starting on August 12, 1995. Izzy also served as the player character in a video game titled Izzy's Quest for the Olympic Rings, released in 1995 by U.S. Gold for the Super NES and Genesis platforms. An adventure game entitled Izzy's Adventure was released for PC in 1996.

== Reception ==
Izzy was immediately and continuously unpopular. Upon its debut, Atlanta Journal-Constitution's art critic decried it as "an embarrassing commercial-looking thingamajig, aptly named Whatizit". In widespread media uproar across, outlets called Whatizit "the sperm in sneakers," "a big tooth" (Dallas Morning News), roadkill (Washington Times), "a little mutant monstrosity that was born in the toxic dump of somebody's imagination" (Los Angeles Times), and "the most maligned product to come out of Atlanta since New Coke"(Associated Press). The London Daily Telegraph wrote, "it certainly wins a gold for ugliness." New Yorker magazine's first issue under editor-in-chief Tina Brown was noted for an ambitious piece about the connections between Whatizit and abortion.

Insults from famed cartoonists were featured in the Washington Post including a quote from The Simpsons creator Matt Groening calling the character "a bad marriage of the Pillsbury Doughboy and the ugliest California Raisin". In a news segment on the maligned mascot, Bob Costas reported on NBC News that Izzy had tried to drink himself to death in a cola bottling plant. In a happy ending, the mascot attended rehab and recovered from his supposed substance abuse and suicidal ideation problems. However, the segment prompted backlash from parents and a belief that Izzy was promoting alcoholism.

In an unofficial survey conducted by the Atlanta Journal-Constitution, just 14 of 300 survey respondents reported "love it", with the overwhelming majority reported “hate it". "You love your child no matter what they look like and Izzy is Atlanta's child" said a local advertising executive. A joke that circulated in Atlanta around the end of the 1996 games stated that a blue line painted on Peachtree Road, to mark the Olympic Marathon route, was "Izzy's ass being dragged out of town." Ten years after the Games, the Atlanta Olympic Committee's public relations head, Dick Yarbrough, defended Izzy in an interview, noting the disproportionate criticism it received compared to more legitimate issues like the deadly domestic terrorism attack: "Izzy wasn't responsible for the park bombing", he said in the character's defense.

Busch Gardens Williamsburg, a theme park in Williamsburg, Virginia, named a new Wild Mouse roller coaster after the mascot, but the name has since been changed.

"I knew I needed to do something big so that would never be on my tombstone: 'This is the guy who made Izzy.'"

— John Ryan, creator of the highly unpopular 1996 Olympics mascot, "Izzy"

=== Reaction of John Ryan ===
Ryan was unfazed by the widespread disapproval of his design, and said "I was having a blast just listening to what people have come up with to describe it." He admitted it had been "a little weird" for his wife and son to witness the more cruel critics, like a columnist who called it the "Olympic maggot." He said in an interview that he appreciated the passion of the audience: "In art, you're a failure when you're ignored." That year, his fifth grade son supported him by dressing as Izzy for Halloween.

In an interview, Izzy told the Atlanta Journal-Constitution, "Once you get to know me, I think you'll like me. Maybe with these games, the media needed something to make fun of, and that's OK".

== Legacy ==
In 2022, an Associated Press headline declared that Izzy's run as "worst Olympic mascot" had been ended by the 2024 Summer Olympics mascot Phryges, which was compared to a "clitoris in trainers".

Large quantities of Izzy merchandise is in the Atlanta History Center's basement according to Atlanta Magazine, which published a list of unconventional Izzy merchandise including suspenders, plates, neckties, swim caps, a Spalding tennis racket cover, a child-size putter, and diaries.

Preceded by Håkon and Kristin	Olympic mascot Izzy; Atlanta 1996	Succeeded by The Snowlets
