= Hoteles Silken =

Hotel chain based in Spain

Silken Hotels is a hotel chain based in Spain, founded by Antón Iraculis, a businessman known for being responsible for the Isozaki Towers in Bilbao. Silken was founded in 1995, and through its history has created a great hotel empire in Spain.

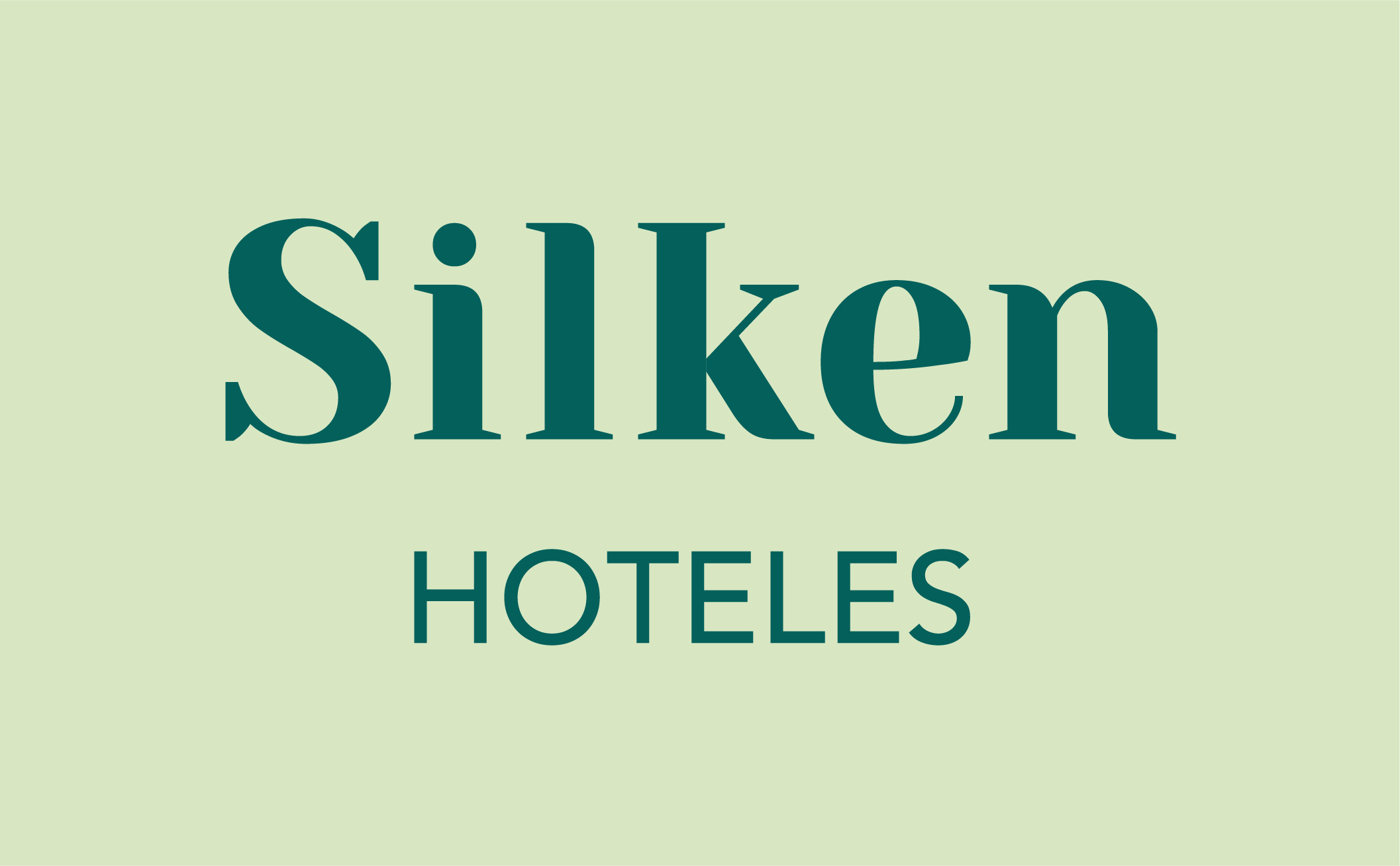

== Hotels ==
- Al-Andalus Sevilla
- Alfonso X Ciudad Real
- Amara Plaza San Sebastián
- Ciudad Gijón
- Ciudad de Vitoria
- Gran Teatro Burgos
- Juan de Austria Valladolid
- Luis de León
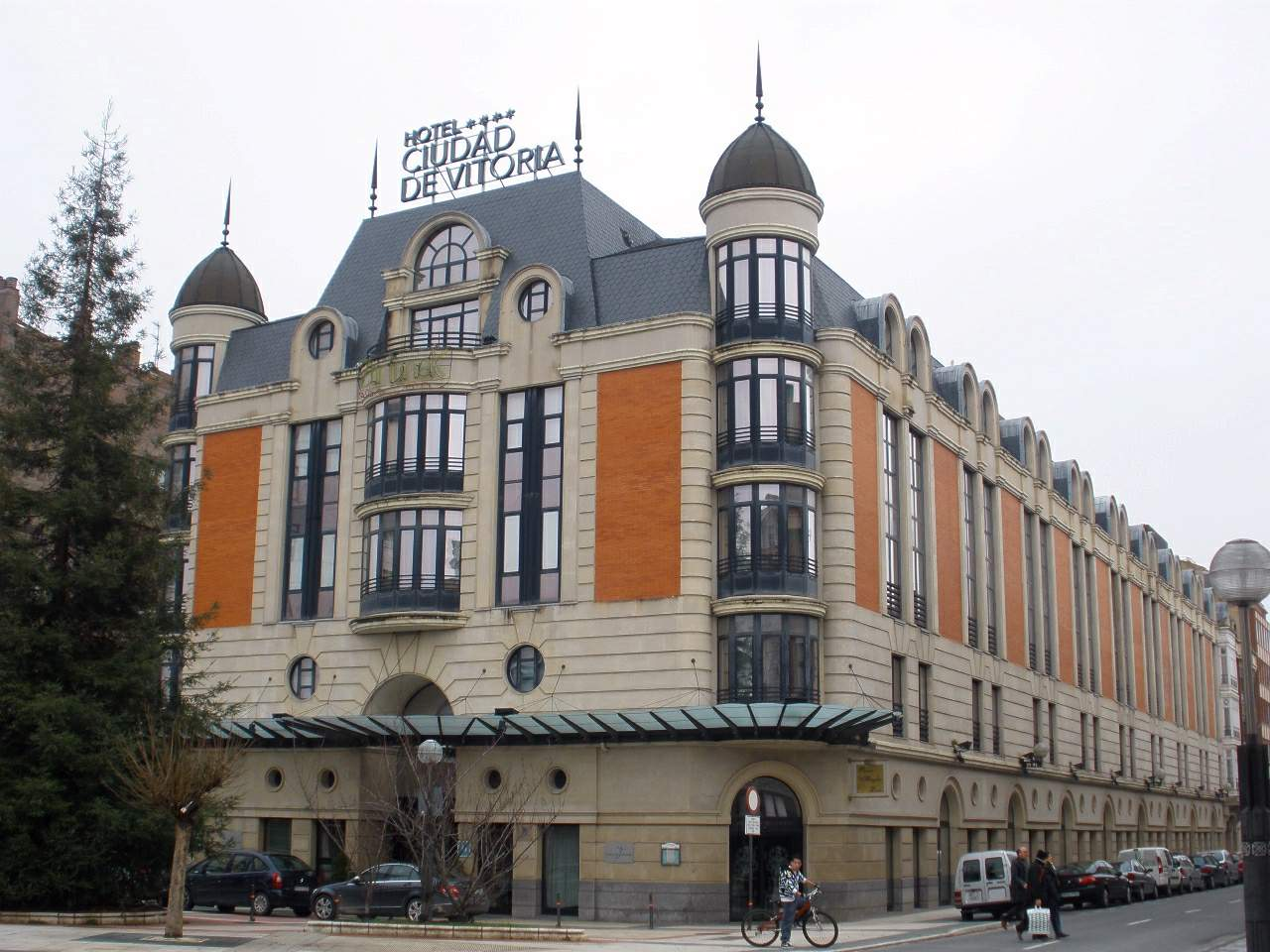
  Hotel Silken Vitoria
- Monumental Naranco Oviedo
- Ordesa
- Palacio Uribarren
- Puerta Valencia
- Ramblas Barcelona
- Reino de Aragón Zaragoza
- Rona Dalba Salamanca
- Saaj Las Palmas
- St. Gervasi Barcelona
- Torre Garden Madrid

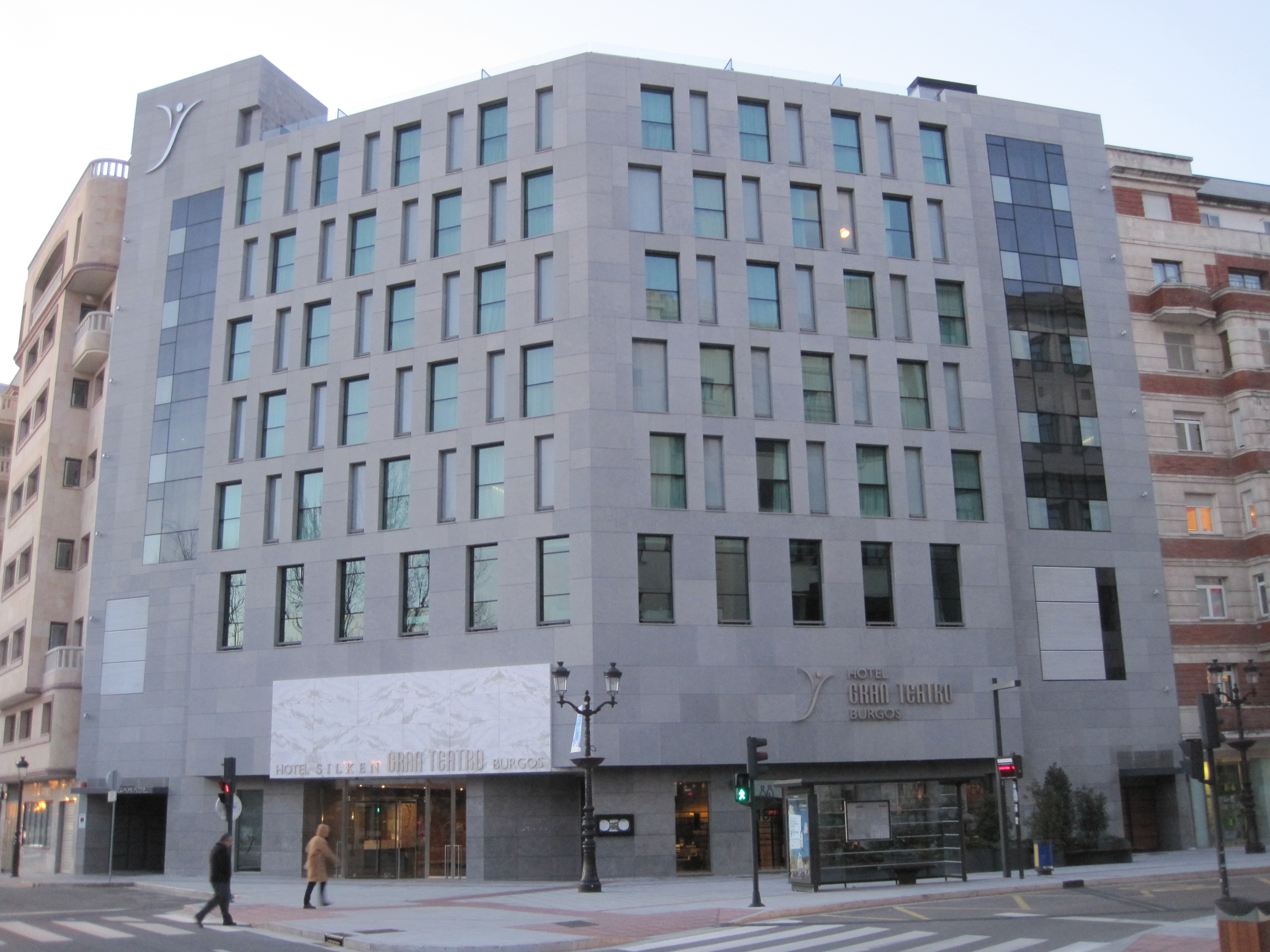
Hotel Silken Burgos
