= Marc Newson =

Australian industrial designer (born 1963)

Marc Newson CBE RDI
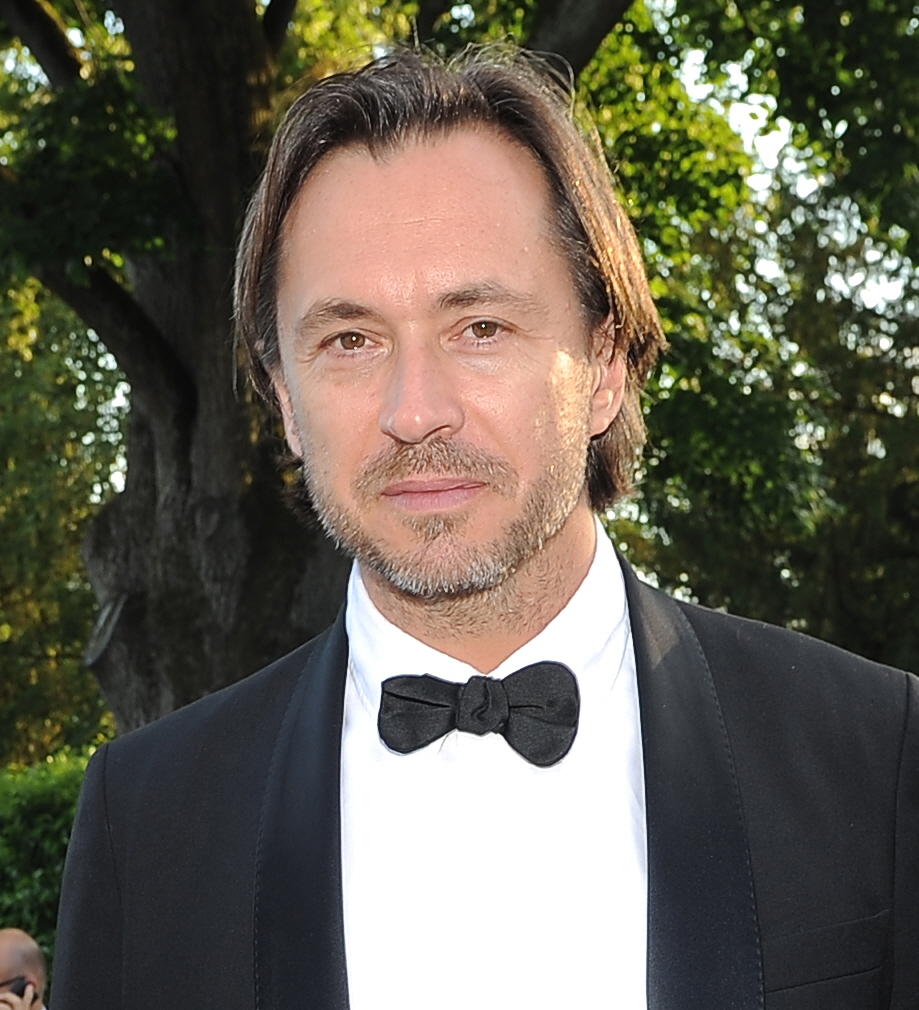
- Newson at the Financial Times Business of Luxury gala reception, June 2011
- Born: Marc Andrew Newson; 20 October 1963 (age 63); Sydney, Australia
- Occupation: Industrial designer
- Known for: Lockheed Lounge
- Spouse: Charlotte Stockdale
- Children: 2

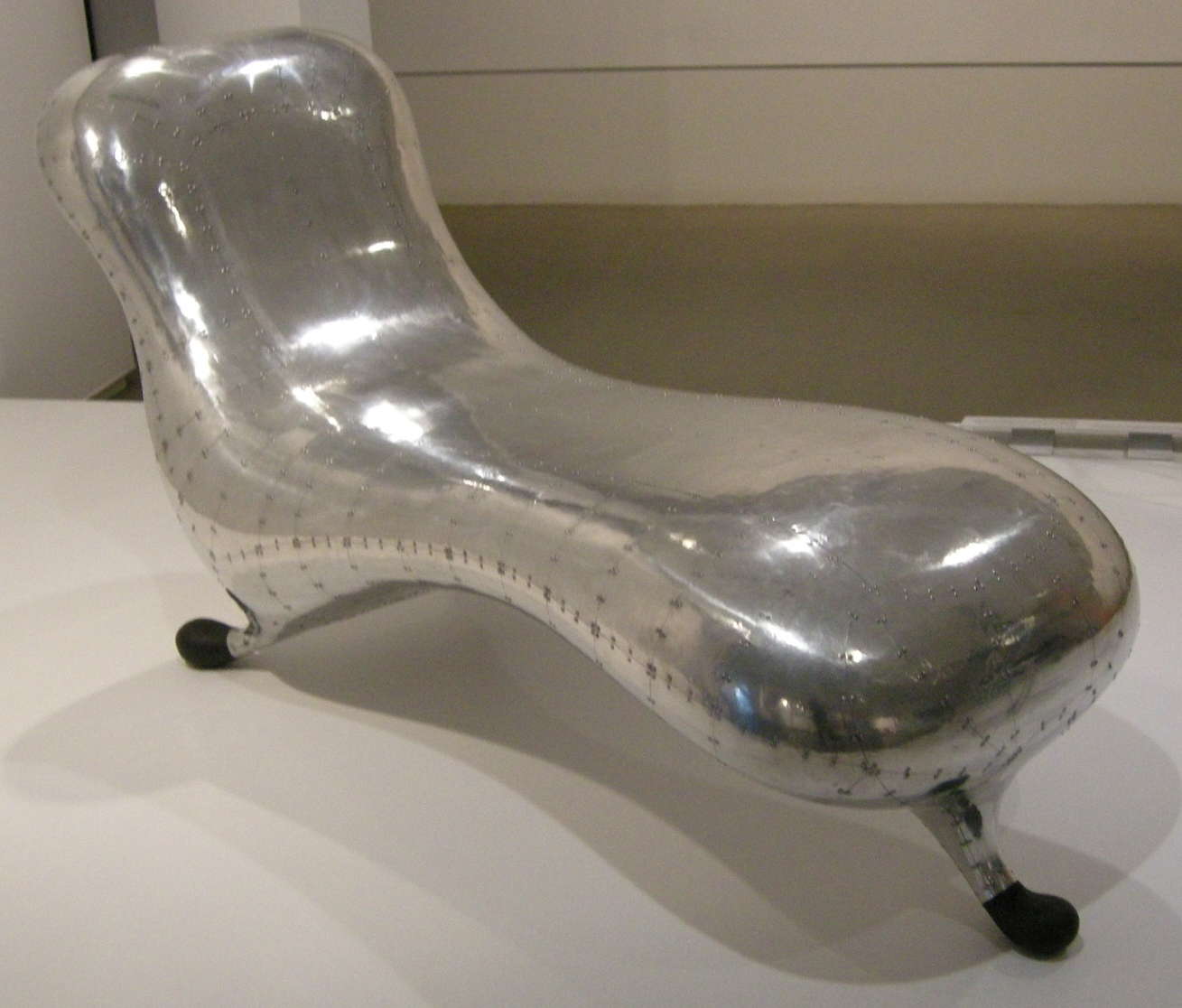
LC2 Lockheed Lounge (National Gallery of Victoria)

Marc Andrew Newson (born 20 October 1963) is an Australian industrial designer, creative director, and artist who has worked in many industry sectors including furniture, product, and transportation design, luxury goods, fashion, and fine art. His work is primarily characterized by smooth geometric lines, organic shapes, an absence of sharp edges, and the use of transparency and translucency.

Newson's Lockheed Lounge chair holds the record for the highest price paid at auction for the work of a living designer. Design critic Alice Rawsthorn called Newson "one of the most influential designers of his generation", and fellow designer Jony Ive has described him as "fairly peerless now".

== Early life and education ==
Newson was born in Sydney, Australia, on 20 October 1963 to Carol and Paul Newson, an electrician. Carol was 19 years old when she was pregnant with Marc, and married Paul during the pregnancy. However, Paul left the family soon after Marc was born, and Carol moved back into her parents’ house to raise Marc.

He is of Greek origin on his mother's side.

Newson studied jewelry design and sculpture the Sydney College of the Arts, and graduated in 1984.

== Career ==
In 1986 Newson was awarded a grant from the Australian Crafts Council and staged his first exhibition at Roslyn Oxley9 gallery, which featured the LC1, the first iteration of an idea that was later developed by Newson into the Lockheed Lounge in 1988. The following year he moved to Tokyo, where he mostly worked with the design company Idée, and where he created works such as the Super Guppy lamp (1987) and the Embryo Chair (1988). He describes his 1988 Embryo Chair as "one of the first pieces where I hit upon a discernible style".

He moved to Paris in 1991, where he set up a studio. He co-founded the Ikepod watch company in 1994, leaving the company in 2012. In 1997 he moved to London, where he and business partner Benjamin de Haan set up Marc Newson Ltd. He has served as an adjunct professor of design at Sydney College of the Arts (where he first studied sculpture and jewellery) and as creative director for Qantas.

He was hired by Jony Ive and joined Apple as a senior vice president of design in September 2014. In June 2019, Newson joined LoveFrom, a design consultancy founded by Ive upon his departure from Apple.

Marc Newson has been represented by Galerie kreo since the year 2000. He is also the only industrial designer represented by the Larry Gagosian gallery.

Speaking about his work and methodology in Domus magazine, Newson claims that “you can draw a curve on the paper and know immediately that it is the right one, but you can not do the same to the computer; the curve is not realized with a function or using a digital guide, it is a form that is drawn freehand.”

Newson designed Cosmos, a 114 meter fuel-cell powered superyacht, built by Lürssen for Yusaku Maezawa, and launched in August 2025.

== Selected work ==
Newson's work has been exhibited in both group exhibitions and in solo shows, with the most recent one being At Home, at the Philadelphia Museum of Art (2013). Objects he has designed include:

=== Furniture and products ===
- "LC1 Chaise Lounge" (1985 precursor to the Lockheed Lounge, with Eckhard Reissig)
- "Peanut chair" (designed in 1988 with Eckhard Reissig)
- "LC2 Lockheed Lounge" (designed in 1988–90 shortly after he graduated from school and one of the items that established Newson as a designer)
- Embryo Chair (1988)
- Pod of drawers
- "Event Horizon" table (1992)
- "Chop Top" table
- New range for Smeg (appliances) in 2009–2010
- Furniture for Cappellini
- Helice Floor Lamp for Flos
- Ikepod watches
- A collection of fittings and a sink for Ideal Standard in 2003
- Talby mobile telephone for KDDI in Japan (c. 2003)
- The "Zvezdochka" shoe for Nike in 2004
- A Magnum Presentation Set for Dom Pérignon in 2006 and 2010 Black Box
- The "Dish Doctor" for Magis in 1997
- The "Scope" series of luggage for Samsonite
- The "Atmos 561" and "Atoms 566" clocks for Jaeger-LeCoultre
- Cookware for Tefal
- Items for Alessi
- Drinking glasses for Iittala
- Clothes for the clothing company G-Star Raw
- Timepieces for freelance companies
- "Kelvin 40" concept jet for the Fondation Cartier pour l'Art Contemporain
- Pentax K-01 mirrorless interchangeable lens camera (2012)
- Louis Vuitton Celebrating Monogram Backpack (2014)
- Safilo capsule collection (2014)
- Caroma range of plumbing fixtures
- Apple Watch Sport, Apple Watch, Apple Watch Edition (2015)
- Decanter design for Hennessy's new Cognac, James Hennessy (2015)
- Montblanc M pen (2015)
- Sunbeam Toaster (2015)
- Hourglass (2015)
- Louis Vuitton luggage (2016)
- NIKE lab AIR VaporMax (2017)
- Newson Aluminium Chair for Knoll (2018)
- Swarovski Optik CL Curio 7x21 Binoculars (2021)
- Newson Task Chair for Knoll (2022)
- Swarovski Optik Ax Visio 10x32 Binoculars with built-in AI bird recognition technology (2024)
- Sukeban wrestling championship belt (2024)
- Ressence Type 3 MN mechanical wristwatch (2025)
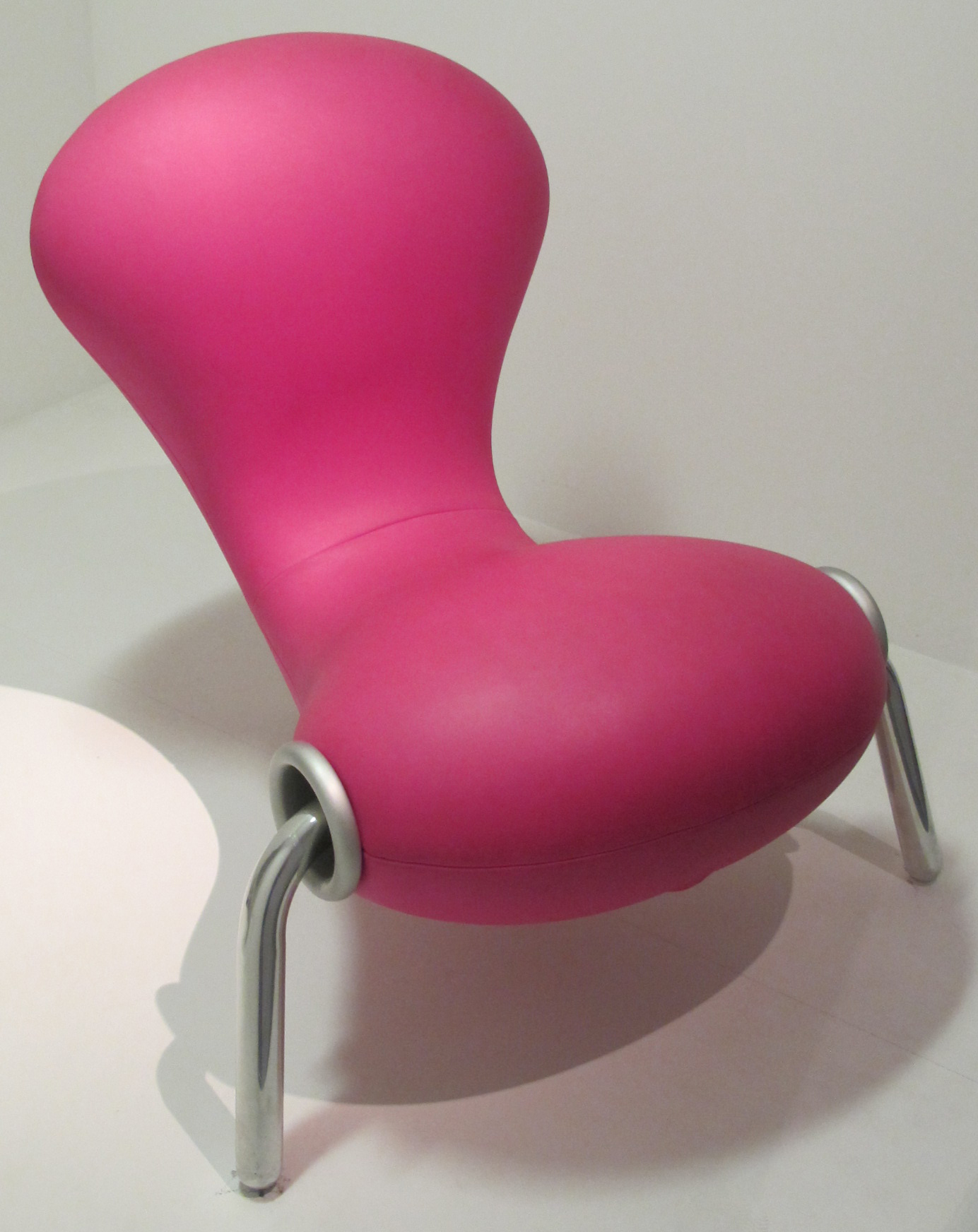
Embryo chair (1988)

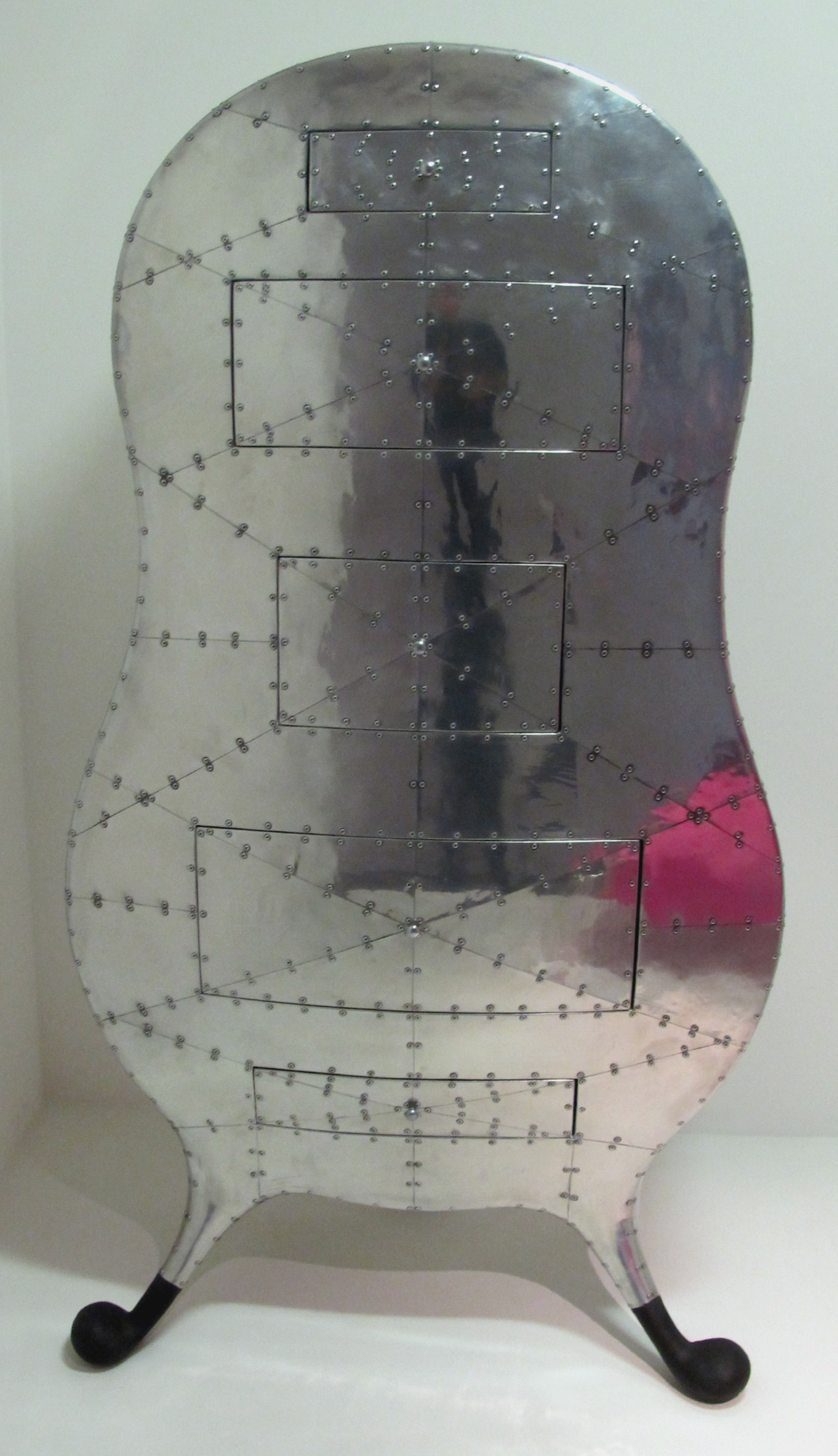
Pod of Drawers

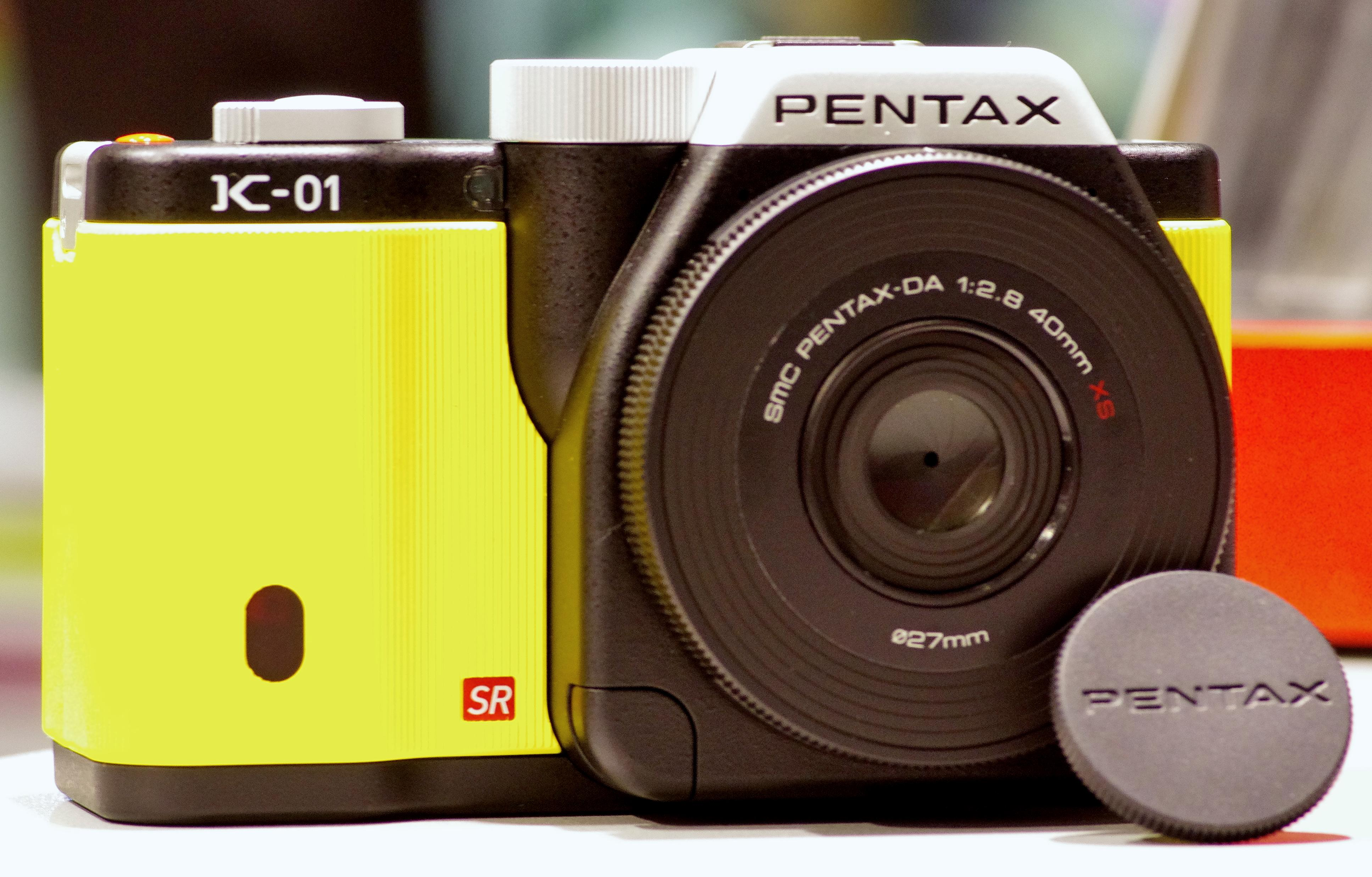
Pentax K-01

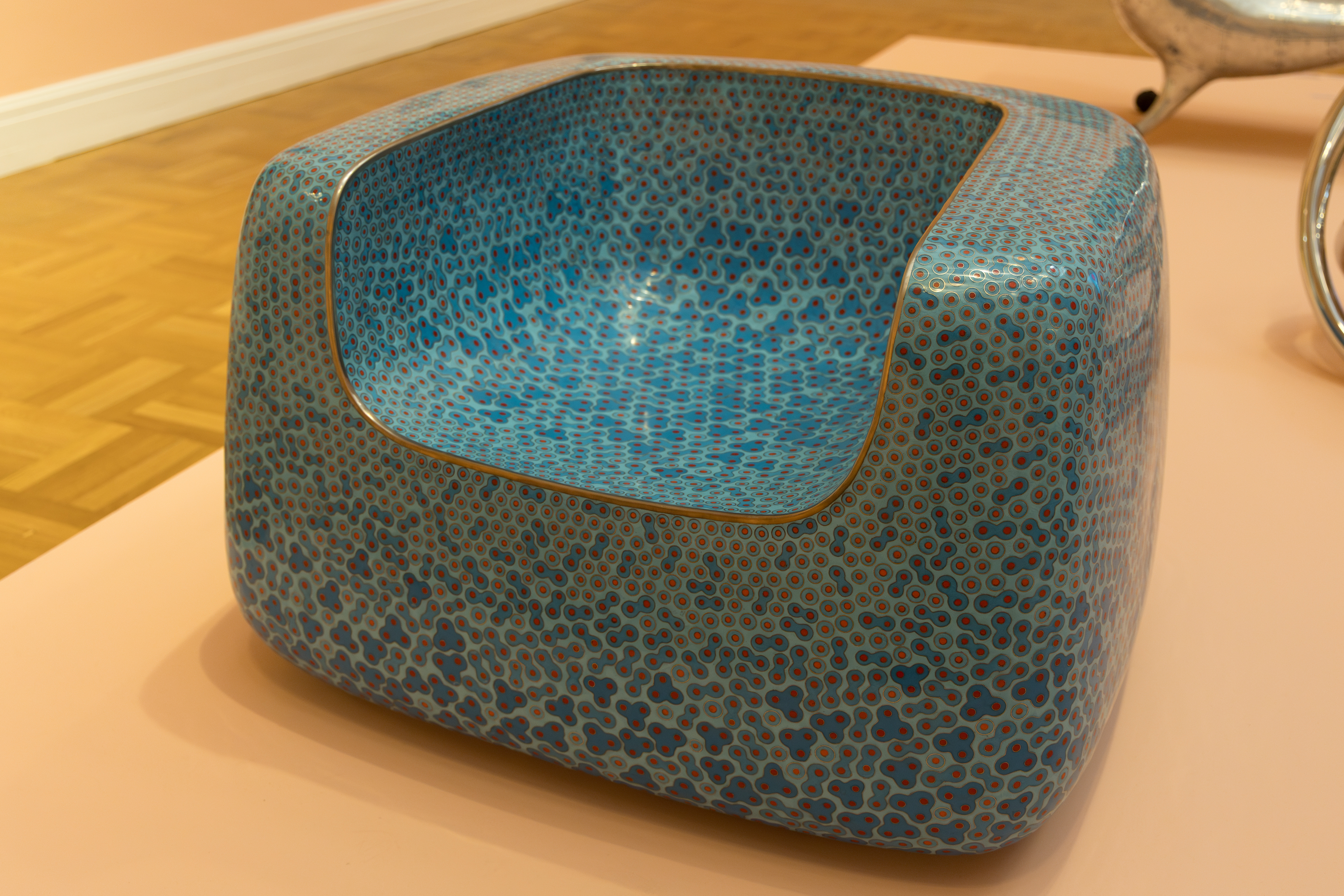
Cloisonné Blue Chair on display at the Art Gallery of South Australia

=== Transportation ===
- MN bicycles for Biomega (1999–2008)
- Trek Art Bike for Lance Armstrong LiveStrong (2009)
- Ford 021C concept car for the Ford Motor Company (1999)
- Qantas International Skybed I (angled flat bed) and II (fully lie-flat bed) business class seat and Airbus A380 economy class seat, winner of the 2009 Australian International Design Award of the Year
- Cabin design for the Airbus Defence and Space Spaceplane (2007)
- Riva Aquariva speedboat (announced in 2010, limited edition of 22 units)
- Qantas A330 business class suite in 2013
- Qantas premium economy seat
- Ferrari Luce (2026)
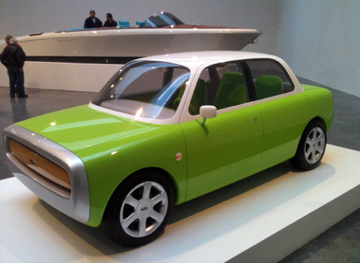
Ford 021C in green; original colour was Pantone orange 021C (1999)

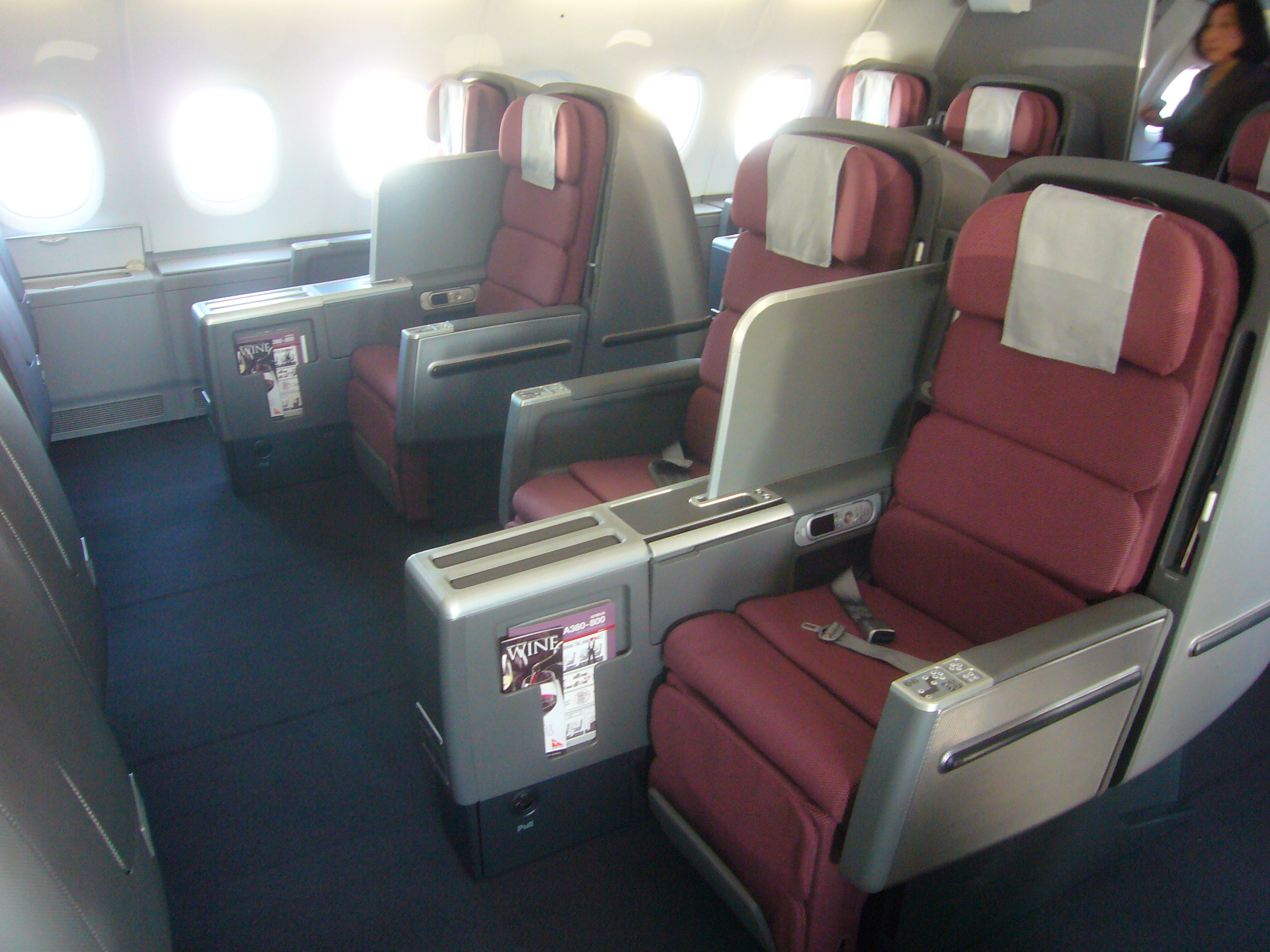
Qantas Skybed (2008)

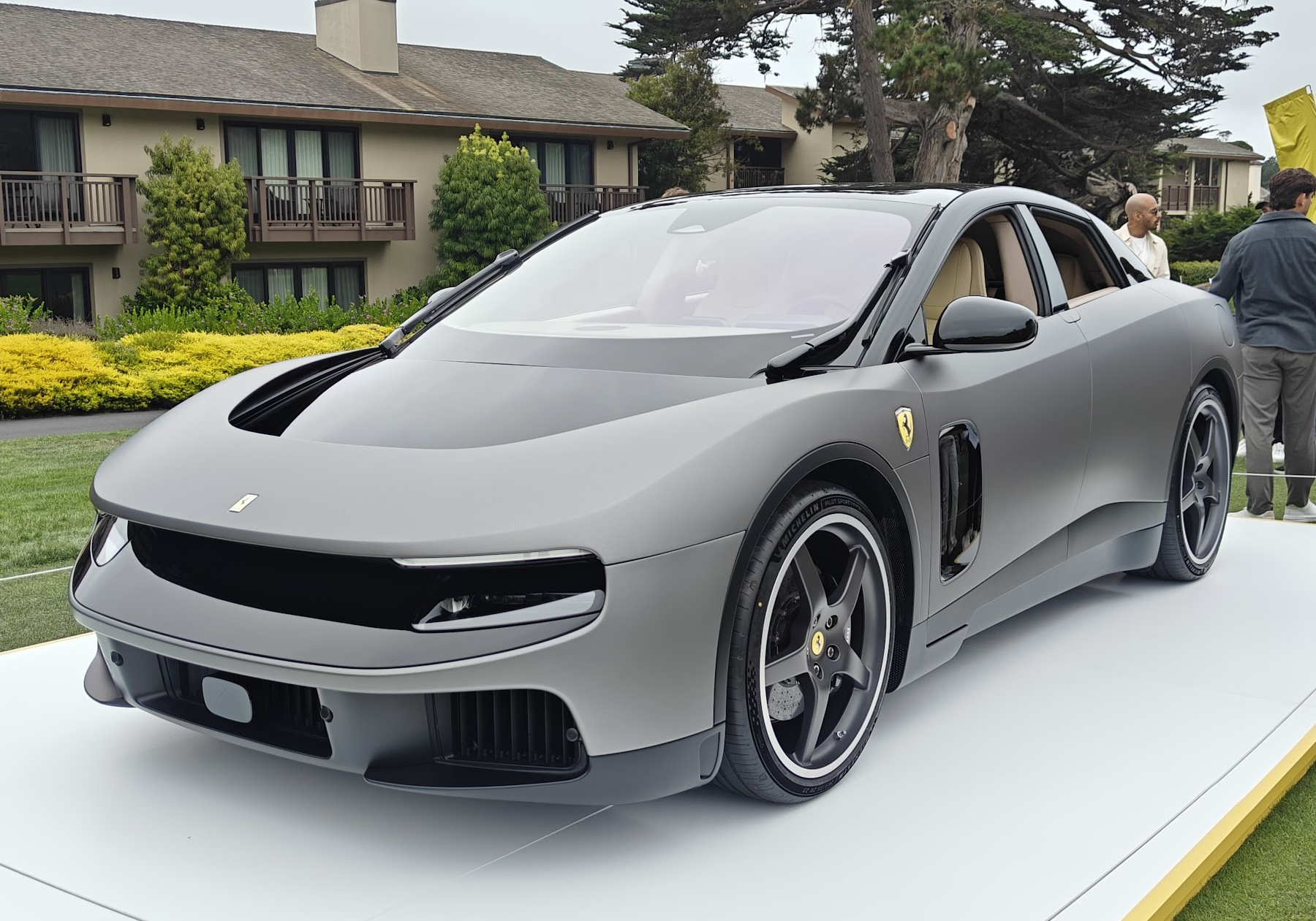
Ferrari Luce (2026)

=== Weapons ===
- 486 shotgun, Beretta, ducks foot (2014)
- "Aikuchi" Samurai sword with Hokke Saburo Nobufusa
- Sintered bronze and Damascus steel knife

=== Interiors, installations, and events ===
- Newson designed the Qantas first class lounges in Melbourne and Sydney, as well as the invitation-only Chairman's Lounges.
- In 1995 Newson designed Coast restaurant in London (in collaboration with architect Robert Grace).
- In the late 1990s, Newson proposed a retail design concept for Apple Stores.
- He designed the Canteen restaurant in the early 2000s and the Lever House Restaurant & Bar in 2003 (in collaboration with the architect Sebastien Segers), both in New York.
- In 2005 he designed the bar and the 6th floor of the Hotel Puerta America in Madrid, where each floor was designed by a world-renowned architect or designer.
- He was selected as the artistic director for the 2011 Sydney New Year's Eve fireworks display.
- He has also designed homes for himself in Paris, London, the Cotswolds, and Greece.
- In 2023 he unveiled his design for a "trustworthy and honest" public toilet in Tokyo.
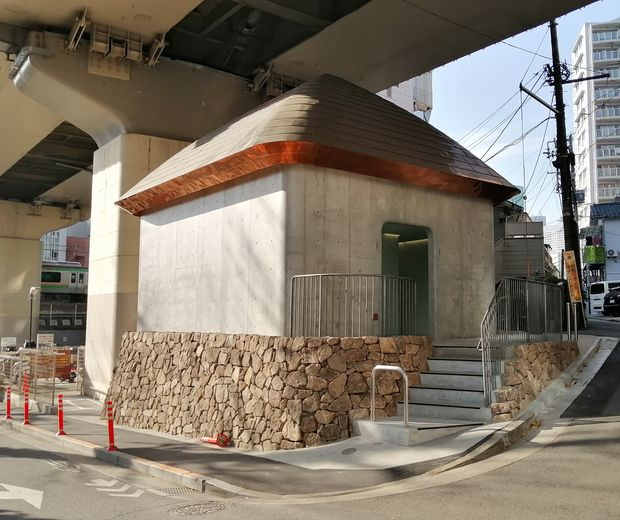
Trustworthy and honest toilet, Tokyo (2023)

== Awards and recognition ==
1999: commemorative postage stamp series celebrating Australian design featured an image of Newson's Embryo Chair on a 90c stamp.

2005: selected as one of Time magazine's 100 most influential people of the year.

2011: winner of the Lucky Strike Designer Award

2012: appointed Commander of the Order of the British Empire (CBE) in the 2012 New Year Honours for services to design.

2013: the Philadelphia Museum of Art staged a retrospective of his work titled Marc Newson: At Home. He also received the museum's Collab Design Excellence Award on the same occasion.

2022: awarded an honorary doctorate by the Royal College of Art in London

2023: winner of Australian Design Prize in the Australian Good Design Awards.

His work has become amongst the highest selling in auctions. An example of his Lockheed Lounge chair sold for $968,000 at Sotheby's in 2006, and £1,100,000 at a 2009 auction at Phillips de Pury & Company. At the 2006 Design Miami fair he produced 12 Chop Top tables, all of which sold out in 20 minutes at an estimated $170,000. In April 2015 his Lockheed Lounge chair sold at auction for £UK2.4 million ($AU4.69 million), making it the most expensive object ever sold by a living designer.

== Personal life ==
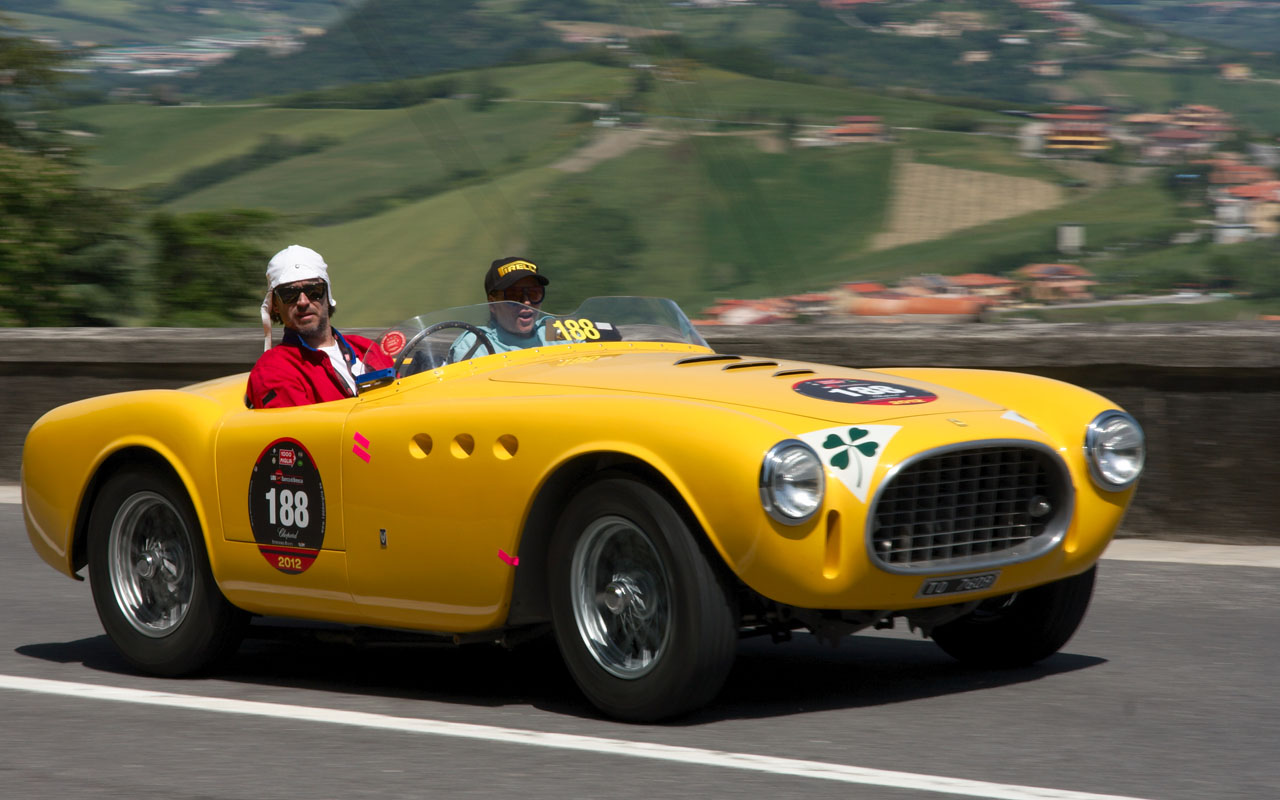
Newson and wife Charlotte Stockdale racing their Ferrari in the Mille Miglia

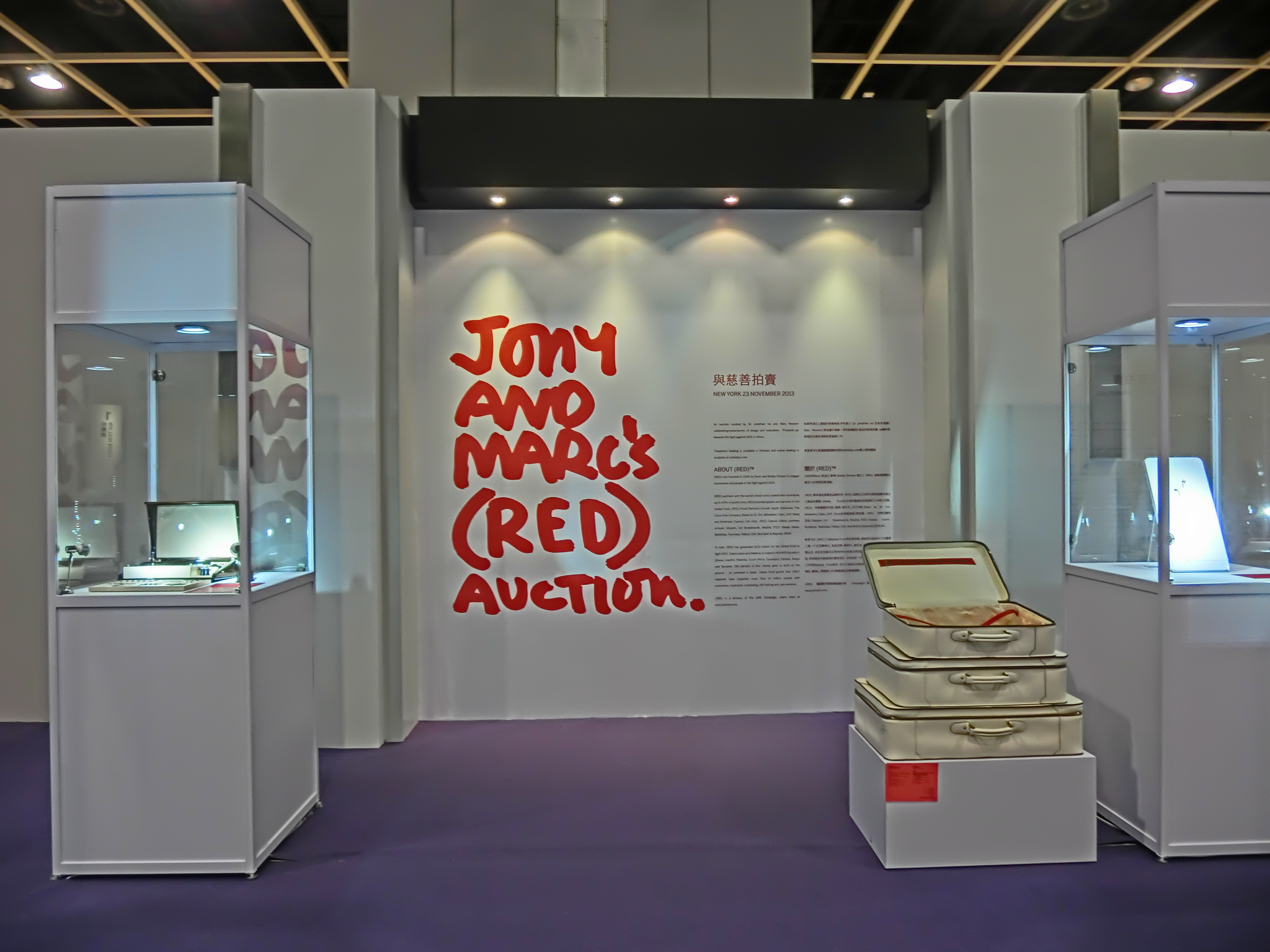
Jony and Marc's Red Auction at Sotheby's

Newson married Charlotte Stockdale, a fashion stylist, in 2008. They have two children and live in Bibury Court, a mansion in the Cotswolds that was converted from its previous use as a hotel. They also have homes in London, Paris, and Greece.

Every year he races one of his four vintage sports cars – an Aston Martin, a Lamborghini, a Ferrari and a Cisitalia – in the Italian Mille Miglia, while wearing bespoke tweed driving suits by H. Huntsman & Sons, and was quoted as saying: "I'm not a motor head, I don't like the new versions of any of those cars."

One of Newson's best friends is Sir Jonathan Ive of Apple Inc., whom he met in Japan. In a 2012 article in The New York Times, Ive described Newson's work:

I think Marc is fairly peerless now. Marc's forms are often imitated, but what other designers seldom imitate is his preoccupation with materials and processes. You have to start with an understanding of the material. Often your innovation is just coming up with a new way to use material.

In 2013, Ive and Newson collaborated on an auction at Sotheby's for Bono's Product Red charity. Over forty objects – "each of which we both like ... functional and capable of being made in volume", per Ive; "deeply personal" per Newson – were curated, modified or designed over a two-year period for the auction and show to benefit The Global Fund to Fight AIDS, Tuberculosis and Malaria. The auction raised $13 million which was subsequently matched by The Bill and Melinda Gates Foundation, bringing the total raised to approximately $26 million.

== Publications ==
- Lloyd Morgan, Conway (2002). Marc Newson. USA: Universe Publishing. ISBN 978-0-7893-0647-0.
- Ferrara, Cinzia (2005). Marc Newson: Design tra organicità e fantascienza [Marc Newson: Design between organicity and science fiction]. Milan: Lupetti. ISBN 978-8883911279.
- Castle, Alison (2012). Marc Newson: Works. Cologne: Taschen. ISBN 978-3-8365-0807-0.
