= Ford 021C =

Concept car

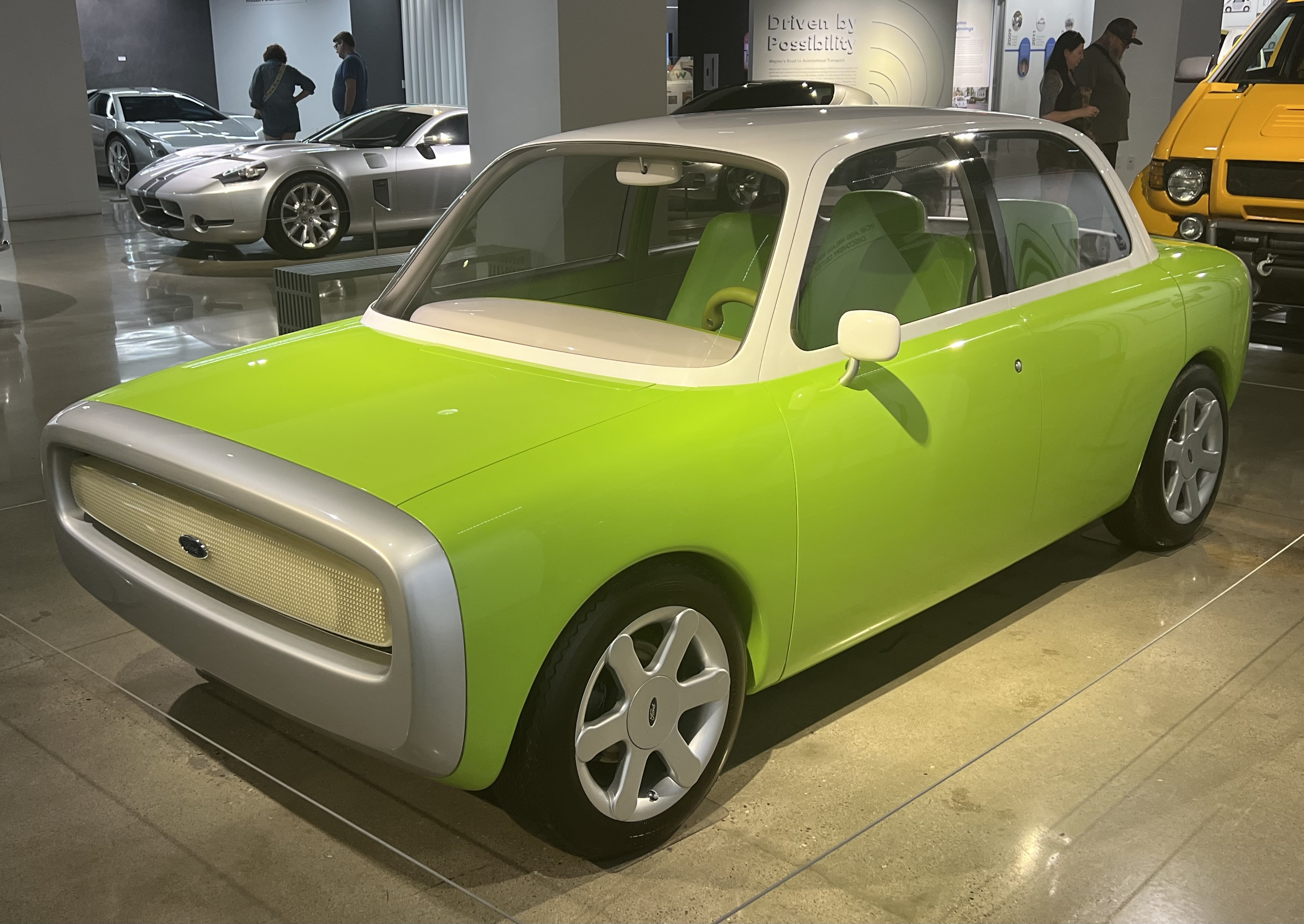
- Ford 021C in green at the Petersen Automotive Museum

Overview
- Production: 1999 (concept)
- Assembly: Ghia
- Designer: Marc Newson, Laurens van den Acker

Body and chassis
- Class: Concept city car (A-seg)
- Body style: 4-door sedan
- Layout: FF

Powertrain
- Engine: 1.6 L Zetec-SE
- Transmission: 4 speed automatic

Dimensions
- Wheelbase: 2,485 mm (97.8 in)
- Length: 3,601 mm (141.8 in)
- Width: 1,648 mm (64.9 in)
- Height: 1,430 mm (56.3 in)

The Ford 021C is a concept car first shown to the public at the October 1999 Tokyo Motor Show by Ford. It was designed by Marc Newson and built by Carrozzeria Ghia in Turin, Italy. The car's name is taken from the Pantone orange colour, said to be Newson's favorite, although it was repainted in lime green when it was brought to the Milan Furniture Fair in April 2000. Ford officials stated that 021C also stands for "21st Century." Although it was produced purely as a styling exercise and was not intended for production, the 021C has been called "one of the great 'what-ifs' of recent car design history."

== Design ==
Ask children to draw a car, and they'll draw something like this, so in many ways the 021C is a familiar and comfortable object. But it doesn't use many typical automotive design cues, and while it does incorporate some interesting technology, it's not technology used simply for the sake of it.

— Marc Newson (1999), Ford Press Release

The design was commissioned by Ford's design director J Mays, who selected Newson after seeing his Lockheed lounge chair in a Madonna video for the song "Rain." The result was a four-door saloon in what Newson termed a "retro-futurist" theme, similar to the predictions made of Year 2000 automobiles in the 1960s. Mays quipped "It's probably more George Jetson than Georg Jensen" at its unveiling. Ford pitched the concept at young buyers (21 years old and younger) who "want quality products which express their individuality.

The exterior and interior shapes echoed prior Newson designs for round-cornered rectangular dish racks, furniture and spoke-and-hub lamps. The concept also incorporated many innovations in the interior such as four seats, with the front two seats swiveling on pedestals; a jewel-like dashboard that moved vertically to accommodate drivers of differing heights; and, when the light was switched on, an electro-luminescent film glowed snowy white across the ceiling. The dashboard dials were built by Newson's Ikepod watch company and the steering wheel was reminiscent of his 1997 Alessi coat hook.

Exterior features included a slide-out boot, suicide doors and LED lamps front and rear. The front and rear lamps were created by Jonathan Coles for Isometrix Lighting. The car was painted green after its unveiling in Tokyo and, unusually for an old prototype, has continued to be shown again at various art exhibits.

== Specifications ==
The 021C is powered by a 1.6 L Zetec engine producing 100 PS (74 kW; 99 bhp) driving the front wheels through a four-speed automatic transmission. The 16" alloy wheels were fitted with bespoke graphite coloured Pirelli tyres. The body of the car was constructed from carbon fiber composites and was designed with minimal surface ornamentation.

The car was 3,601 mm (141.8 in) long, 1,648 mm (64.9 in) wide and sat on a wheelbase of 2,485 mm (97.8 in). It is 19 mm (0.75 in) shorter than the contemporary first-generation Ford Ka city car.

== Reception ==
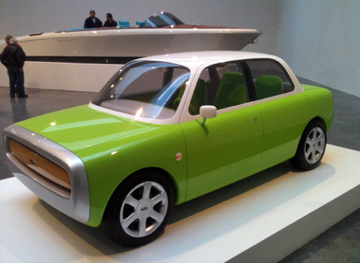
021C in green at the Gagosian Gallery in NYC in 2011

After its 1999 unveiling at the Tokyo Auto Show, automotive critics generally panned the design, with one self-deprecatingly calling himself "old and out of touch" and thus unable to appreciate what was perceived as a toy-like, naïve box. Others noted the sharp divide in opinions between "traditional" automotive styling critics and design professionals, who hailed the unified concepts in the design. Jonathan Glancey, writing for The Guardian, said at the time that most "contemporary car design is about as interesting as watching magnolia paint dry" and called the 021C "an eye-catcher", noting that "[it made] everyone who saw it smile."

In 2009, ten years after it was first unveiled, critics revisited the design of the 021C and found the design had aged well, still appearing sleek and modern. Alex Kierstein, writing for Automobile in 2020, noted influences from the original iMac G3 and called it "ahead of its time ... had Newson penned the Ford 021C today, maybe it could have been recast as a small production EV", comparing it to contemporary small EVs such as the Fiat New 500 and Honda e.

== In popular media ==
A car similar to the Ford 021C received a parking citation from newly minted officer Judy Hopps in the movie Zootopia. J Mays is credited as the chief car designer for the film.

== Exhibited ==
- Tokyo Motor Show, October 1999
- North American International Auto Show, January 2000
- Milan Furniture Fair, April 2000
- Design Museum London, May–July 2001
- Gagosian Gallery New York, September–October 2010
- Philadelphia Museum of Art, Nov 2013 – Apr 2014

== See also ==
- International Scout
- Ferrari Luce
- Nissan Figaro
- Renault Dauphine
