= Ikepod =

Swiss wristwatch company

- Industry: Watch manufacturing
- Founded: 1994; 32 years ago
- Founder: Oliver Ike and Marc Newson
- Headquarters: Geneva, Switzerland
- Products: Watches
- Owner: Christian-Louis Col
- Website: ikepod.com

Ikepod is an independent luxury watch brand introduced in 1994 by Swiss entrepreneur Oliver Ike and Australian designer Marc Newson, known for its avant-garde lugless watches with thick cases. The name combines "Ike" and "Pod" – referring to its co‑founder and Newson's original watch. After filing for bankruptcy in 2003, Newson left the brand in 2012, and Ikepod came back on 18 September 2018 via Kickstarter.

== History ==
Ikepod is a Swiss watch company founded in 1994 by Oliver Ike and Marc Newson and known for its disc-shaped design watches with no lugs. The brand's name combines "Ike" and "Pod", the first watch that Newson created in 1986. Their first model, the Seaslug, debuted in 1994 with a convex bezel and a bowl-shaped case whose diameter measured at 39mm. The Hemipode, introduced three years later, had a thicker case, with a 44mm diameter, but its thickness was surpassed by the 1999 titanium-crafted Megapode Chrono, which was intended to be a pilot's watch and featured unit conversions. At 47mm, the Megapode is the largest Ikepod watch to date. The Ikepods were among the first "concept watches" to start the wave of big diameter design watches in the millennial years with cases in gold, silver, steel, platinum and titanium and exclusive limited edition watch conceptions bordering on the limits of art. In 2003, Ikepod filed for bankruptcy, and the brand was bought by the Perficio Group, which also filed for bankruptcy in 2005.

After being revived in 2008, Ikepod's watches became more minimalistic, as the brand collaborated with Kaws and Jeff Koons, but Newson left the company in 2012, and the brand was bought in April 2017 by three investors. The new CEO, Christian-Louis Col, has announced that the new Ikepods have maintained the original design elements but have overcome the technical complications of the original Ikepod cases. Furthermore, the Ikepods are no longer produced in Switzerland, but in Hong Kong with Japanese Miyota quartz movements to make them more affordable.

=== Relaunch ===
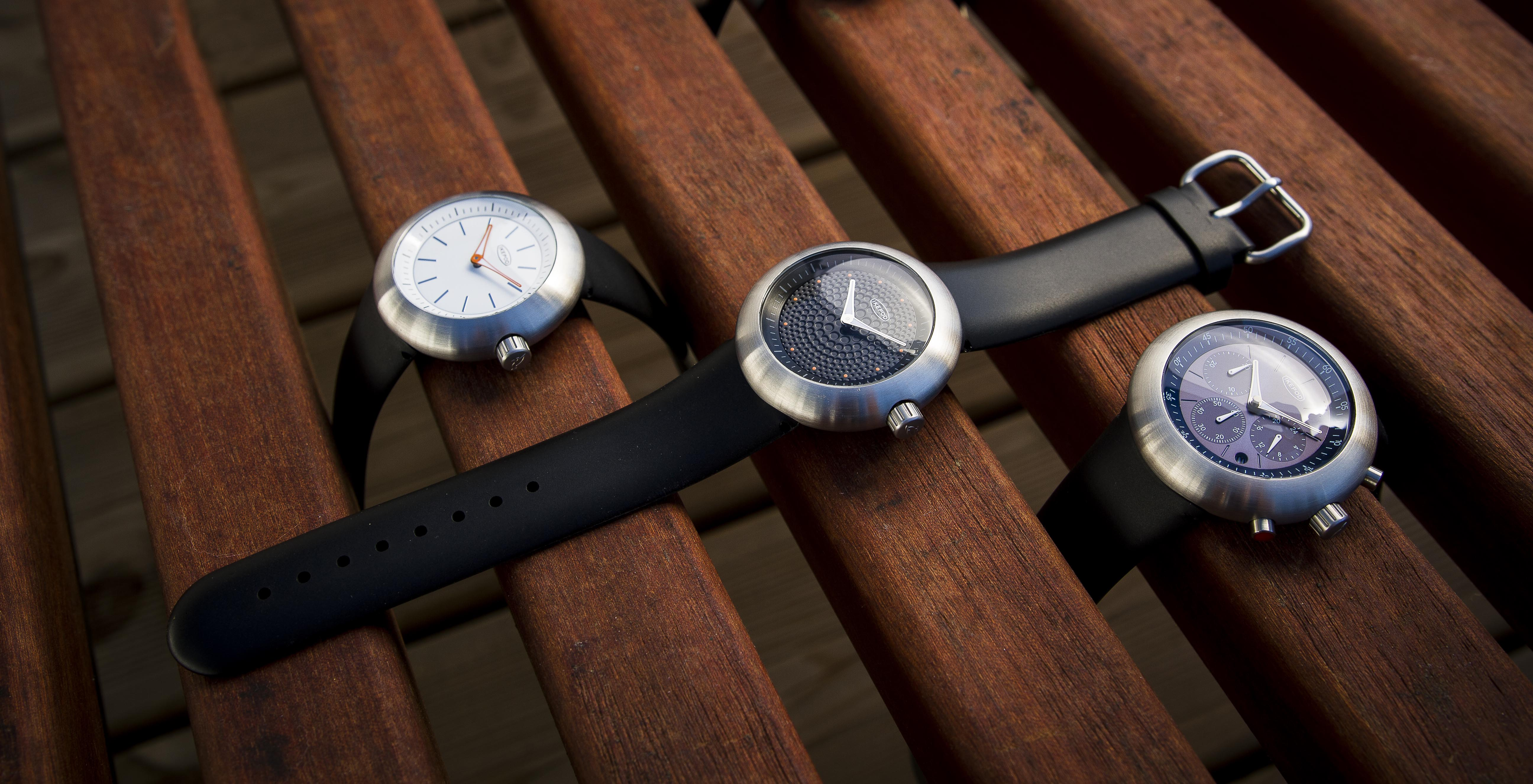
Three of the new Ikepod watches released on Kickstarter in 2018

Ikepod relaunched on Kickstarter on 18 September 2018. The new Ikepods were designed in Switzerland by Emmanuel Gueit, the Swiss watch designer responsible for the Audemars Piguet Royal Oak Offshore. The new Ikepod models, called the Duopod and Chronopod, measure at 42mm and 44mm in diameter, respectively, and feature the same elliptic forms. The new models are based on the original Ikepod Horizon and Hemipode models, but they were powered by quartz movements. The company states that its Duopods and Chronopods wear more like 39mm and 41mm watches because of the lack of external lugs and the way the case tapers at the edges.

After leaving Ikepod in 2012, Newson worked at Apple Inc. from 2014 to 2019; during this time, he designed the Apple Watch, which used minimalistic design choices resembling the Ikepod. He collaborated with Ressence in late 2025 to create the Type 3 Marc Newson, which was filled with oil and inspired by his early Ikepod designs. Furthermore, the Type 3's color scheme was inspired by the Ikepod Megapode.

==== Megapod ====
The Megapod, which released on Kickstarter on 24 March 2020, is powered by the Miyota 9039 and uses the same shape as the Duopod, albeit with a 46mm case, which is slightly smaller than the watch's inspiration, the Megapode. Since its release, multiple variations of the watch have been distributed, including a four-way collaboration, and "Skaters in the Sky", a 200-piece set in collaboration with Tom Christopher. A limited edition 100-piece set called the Megapod Hour Glass was released in 2024, and was designed by Alexandre Peraldi. The set's hourglass theme refers to an earlier set of watches created by Newson in 2011 called the Ikepod Hourglass.
