= J Mays =

American industrial designer (born 1954)

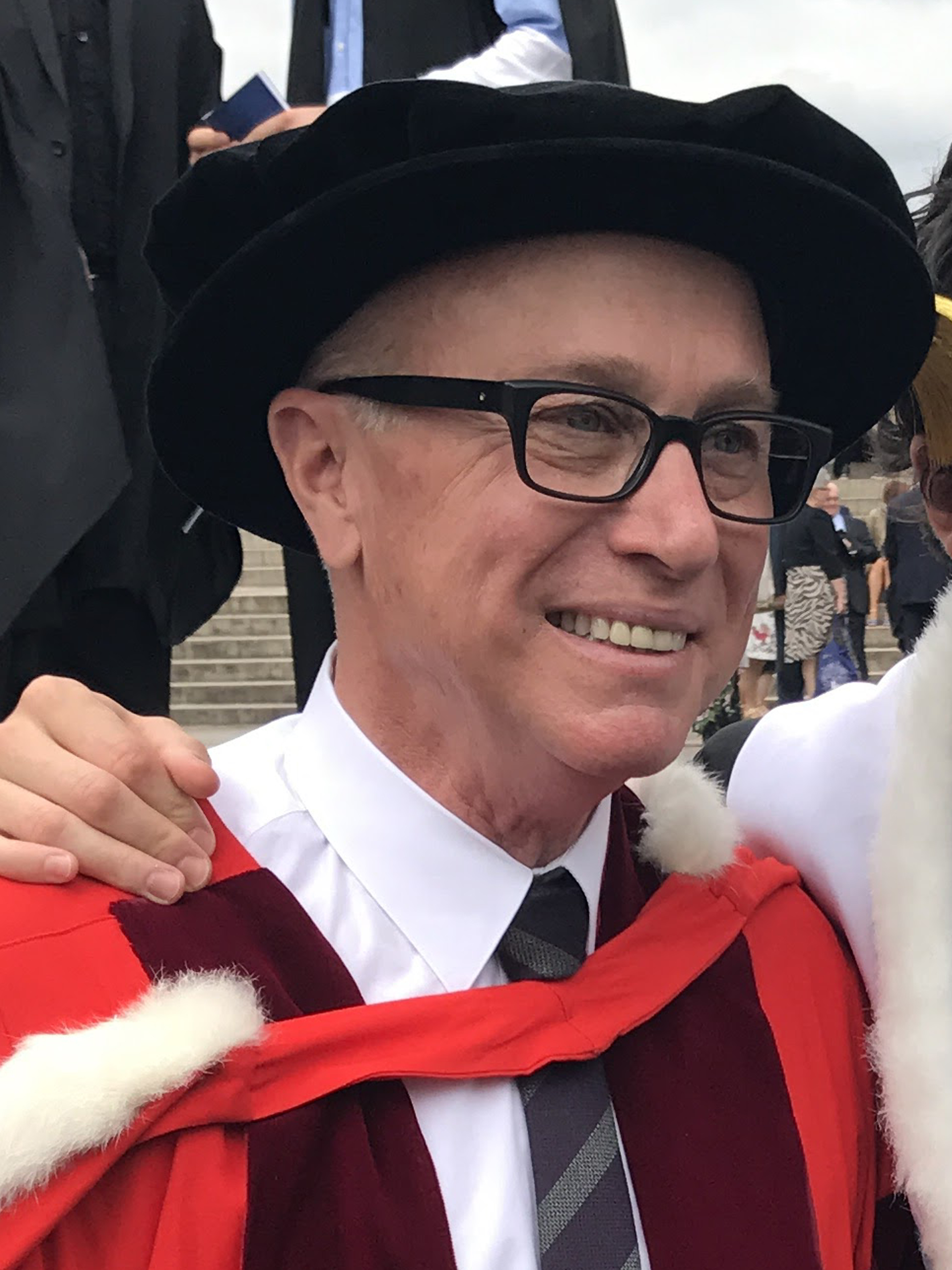
- Mays in 2017
- Born: J Carrol Mays; 15 October 1954 (age 71); Pauls Valley, Oklahoma, U.S.
- Education: ArtCenter College of Design (B.S.)
- Employer(s): Ford Motor Company (1997–2013); Whirlpool Corporation (2018–2021)

J Carrol Mays (born 15 October 1954) is a retired American industrial designer who served as Group Vice President of Global Design and Chief Creative Officer at the Ford Motor Company, and was Chief Design Officer at Whirlpool.

== Early life and education ==
Mays was born in Pauls Valley, Oklahoma and raised in nearby Maysville. His first name is simply "J", after his grandfather, S J Mays. He started working at his family's auto parts store at an early age. While attending Maysville High School, Mays enrolled in an occupational drafting program at Mid-America Technology Center in Wayne, Oklahoma, with aspirations of architecture. After high school, he studied commercial art at the University of Oklahoma before briefly switching to journalism. In 1976, he transferred to the ArtCenter College of Design in Pasadena, California, graduating in 1980 with a Bachelor of Science degree in transportation design.

== Career ==
=== Volkswagen Group and BMW ===
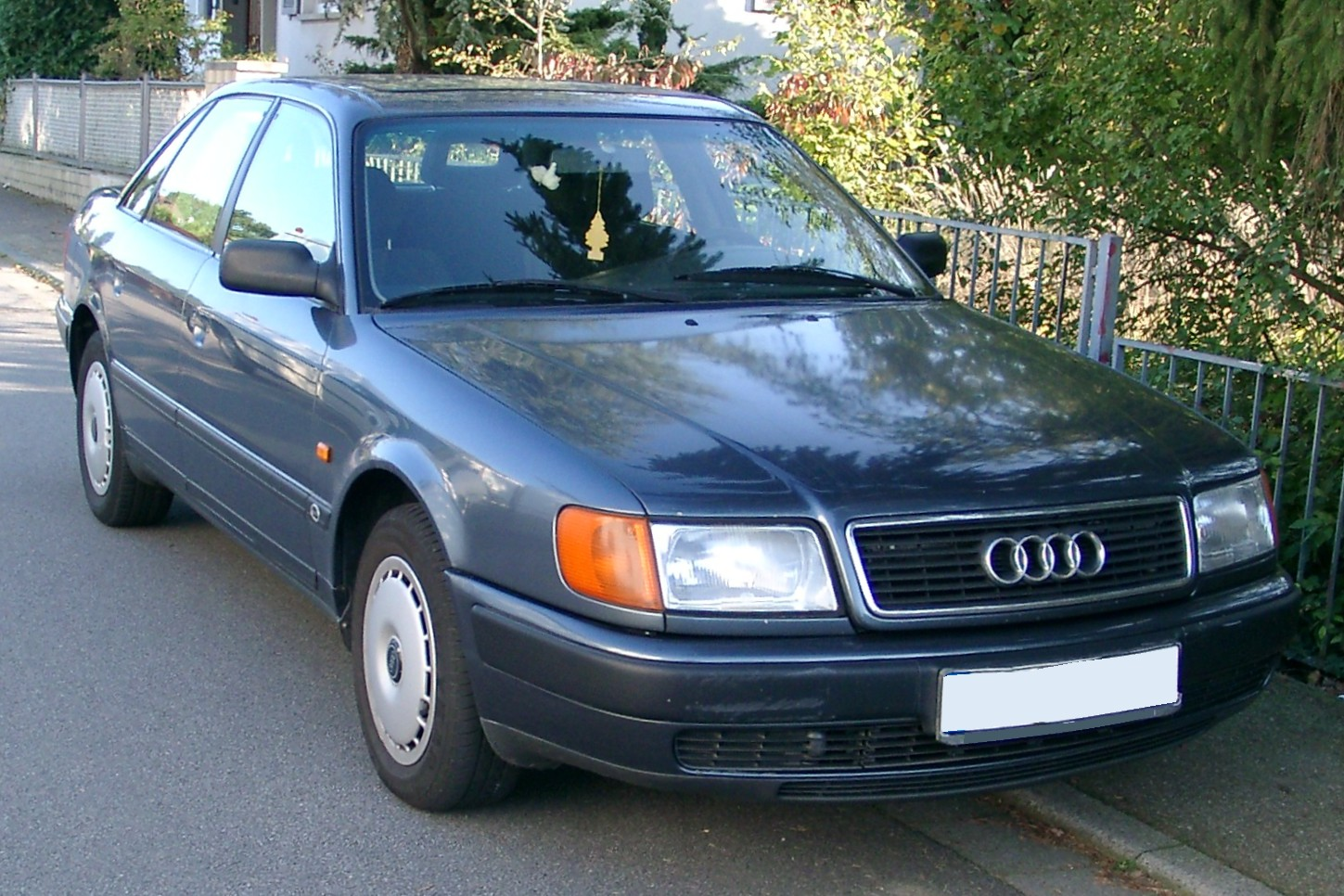
Mays worked on the 1991 Audi 100 design team.

Mays began his career as an exterior designer at AUDI AG, a subsidiary of Volkswagen Group, in Ingolstadt, Germany. While there he worked on the design of the 1986 Audi 80 B3. After a brief stint in 1983 at BMW in Munich where he worked on designs for the 5 Series E34 and 8 Series cars, he returned to Audi the following year as senior designer, where he worked on the design of the Audi 100 C4, Volkswagen Golf III and Volkswagen Polo.

In 1991, the Mays-designed Audi Avus quattro concept car was unveiled at the Tokyo Motor Show. The Avus, named for the 1930s grand-prix racetrack in Berlin evoked the design of the German speed-record cars and gran turismo roadsters of the 1930s. The Avus proved to be significant for both Audi and Mays. The form of the Avus led to the development of Audi's TT, designed by Mays' Art Center colleague Freeman Thomas, later to become head of Ford's Strategic Design in 2005.

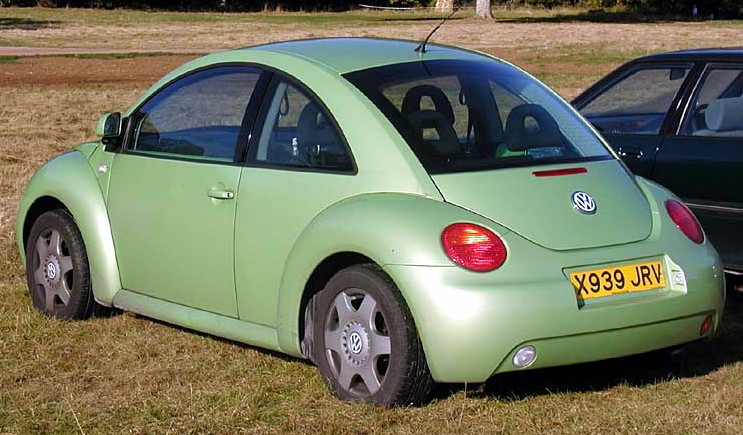
Mays headed the Volkswagen Concept 1 project.

Mays moved back to the United States in 1989, to become chief designer at the Volkswagen of America Design Center in Simi Valley, California. While there, he collaborated with Thomas on the design of the Volkswagen Concept 1 concept car, a modern re-interpretation of the original Volkswagen Beetle. This was first shown at the 1994 North American International Auto Show, and the positive response led to the car entering production as the Volkswagen New Beetle.

He returned to Germany in 1993 as Audi's design director responsible for the company's worldwide design strategy, development and execution.

=== SHR Perceptual Management ===
In 1995, Mays became vice president of Design Development for SHR Perceptual Management, a consultancy that worked for numerous automotive companies, including Ford.

=== Ford Motor Company: 1997–2013 ===
Replacing Jack Telnack as global Vice President of Design of the Ford Motor Company in 1997, Mays became responsible for the design direction of Ford Motor Company's eight brands (Ford, Lincoln, Mercury, Mazda, Volvo, Land Rover, Jaguar, and Aston Martin). He was responsible for a number of concept car designs, including the Ford Fairlane, Shelby GR-1, 021C and "427", Jaguar F-Type and Volvo SCC. Mays has been involved in the design of numerous production models, including the Aston Martin DB9, Land Rover LR3/Discovery, Ford GT, Ford Shelby GT500, 2005 Ford Five Hundred, 2011 Ford Fiesta, 2012 Focus, 2015 Ford Mustang, and 2015 Ford F-150.

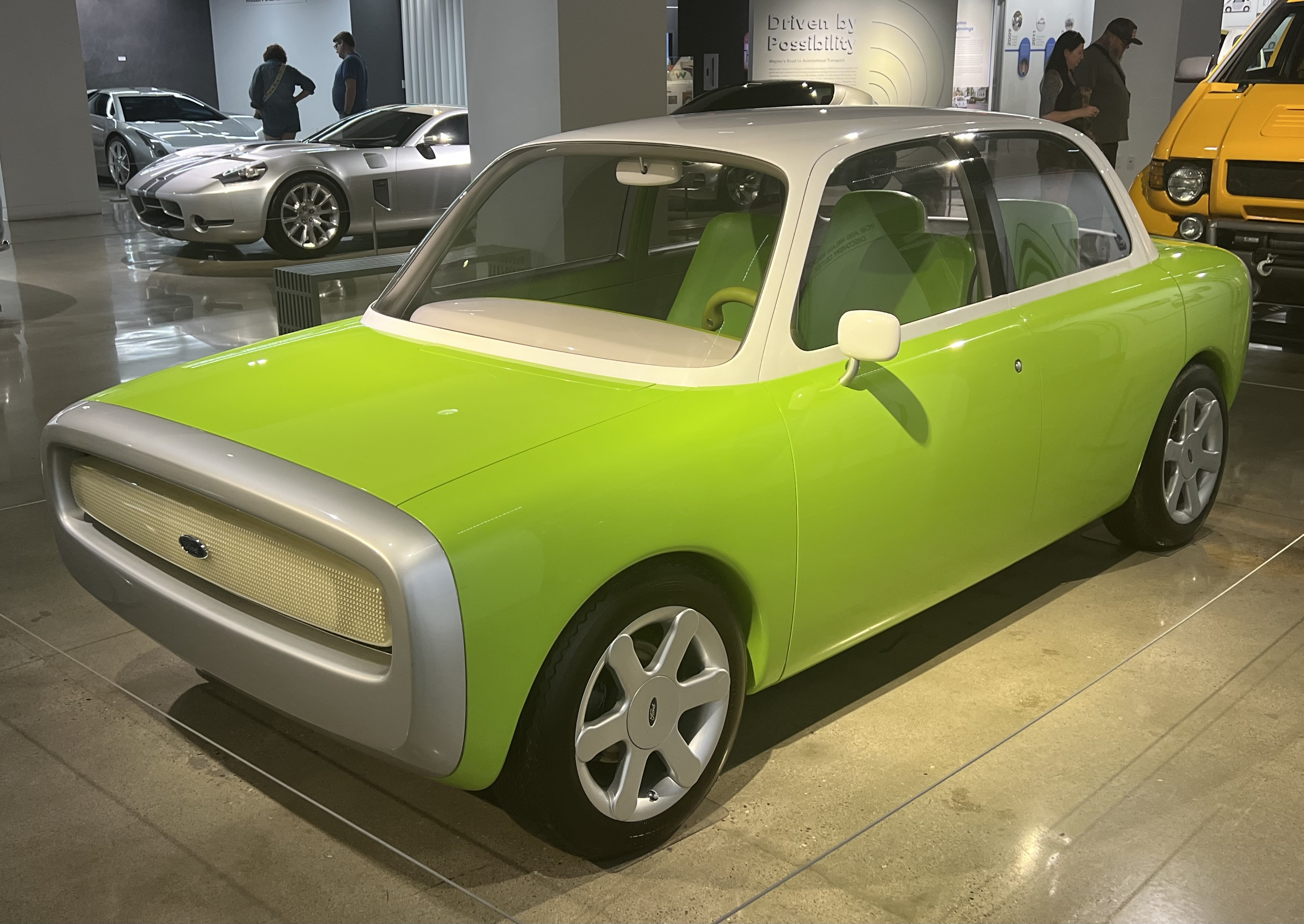
1999 Ford 021C at the Petersen Automotive Museum

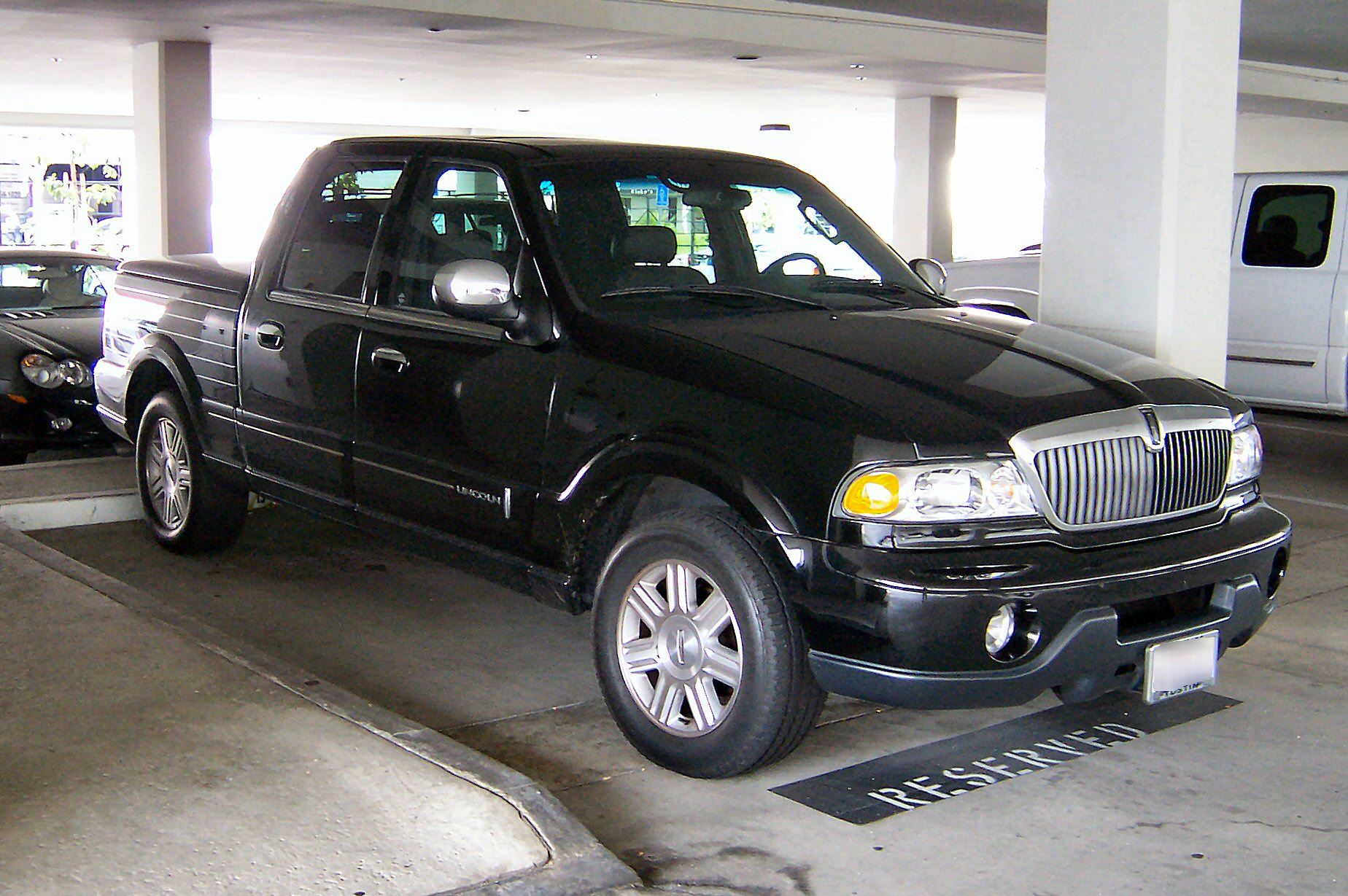
The Lincoln Blackwood debuted in concept car form at the 1999 LA Auto Show, but the 2002 vehicle proved to be a commercial failure.

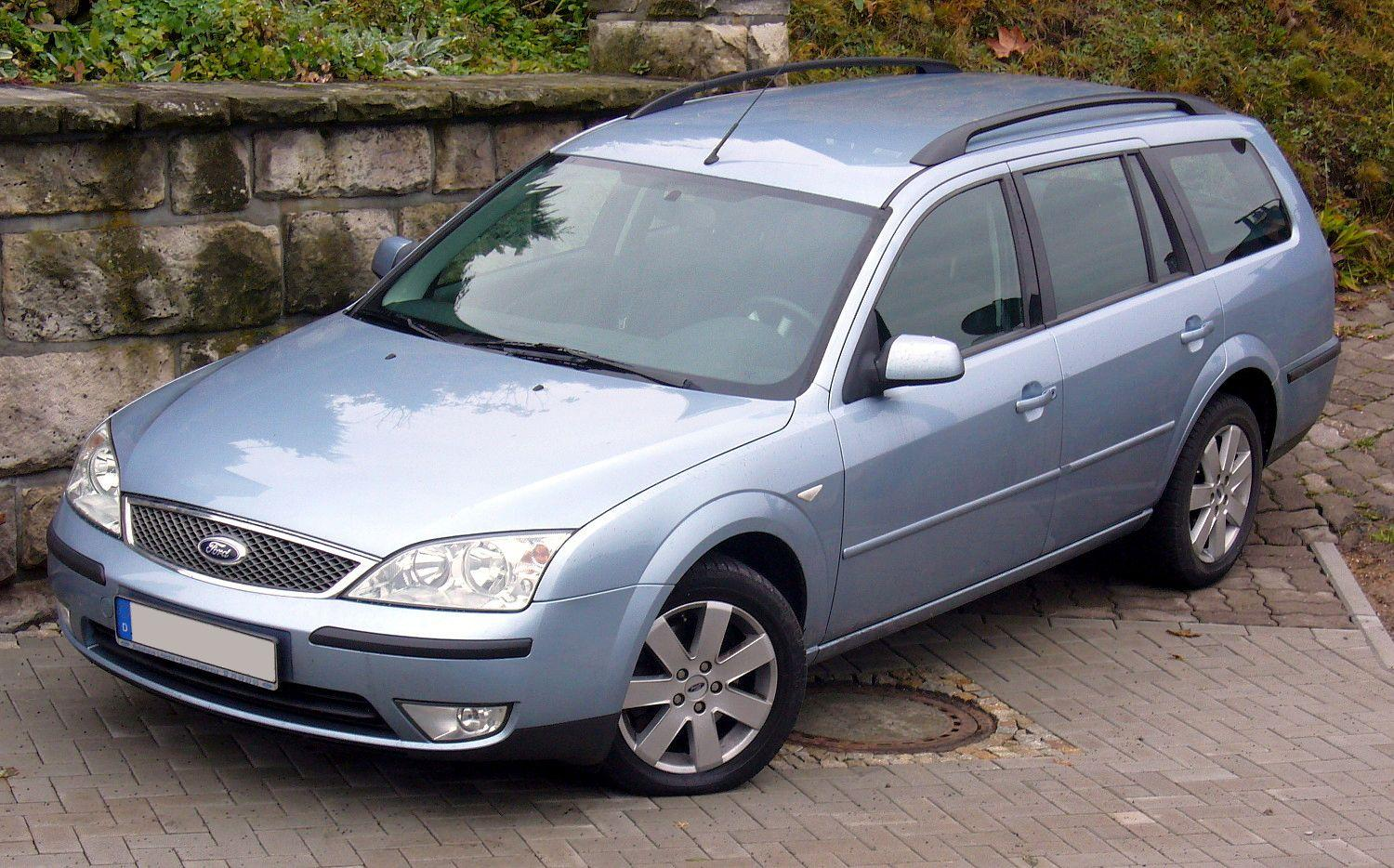
Ford Mondeo

While at Ford, Mays has received several professional awards and recognition for his designs. In November 2002, Mays' designs were the subject of an exhibition, "Retrofuturism: The Car Design of J Mays," organized by MOCA Curator of Architecture & Design Brooke Hodge and presented at the Geffen Contemporary of the Museum of Contemporary Art in Los Angeles. He also received the Harvard Design School annual Excellence in Design Award in February 2002, and in September 2002, the Don Kubly Professional Attainment Award from the Art Center College of Design.

On 1 November 2011, Mays announced that the next generation Australian Ford Falcon, expected after 2015, is likely to be front-wheel drive or front-wheel drive based 'all-wheel drive'.

At the 2011 Los Angeles auto show, Mays talked about the advancement of technology integrated into Ford's production line, and how that has driven vehicle design, especially interior design. Mays retired from Ford at the end of 2013 and was replaced by Moray Callum, an accomplished designer in his own right (he worked with Tesla chief designer Franz von Holzhausen when both were at Mazda) and the younger brother of famed Jaguar creative lead Ian Callum.

=== Pixar ===
John Lasseter approached J Mays to work with Pixar as a design consultant during his times at Ford and RCA. Having originally helped during the production of Cars, he had gone on to continue involvement with several other movies, including designing the robot for Big Hero 6 and the vehicles in Zootopia.

=== Vehicle Design and Intelligent Mobility course at Royal College of Art ===
Beginning from September 2015, J Mays started contributing to the Royal College of Art's prestigious Vehicle Design programme as a visiting professor. The course was later renamed to Intelligent Mobility from 2018.

=== Whirlpool ===
In September 2018, Whirlpool announced Mays as its new VP and chief design officer. Mays retired at the end of 2021.
