= Brooke Hodge =

American museum administrator and curator

- Born: 1960
- Occupation: Author

Brooke Hodge (born 1960, Vancouver, B.C..) is a California-based curator specializing in art, architecture, and design. During a career of over 40 years, Hodge has held senior curatorial and administrative positions at many renowned museums including the Canadian Centre for Architecture (Montreal), the Fogg Art Museum at Harvard University, the Museum of Contemporary Art (MOCA) and the Hammer Museum in Los Angeles, Cooper Hewitt, National Design Museum in New York City, and, most recently, Palm Springs Art Museum in Palm Springs, California. Most notably, in 2001 she was named the first Curator of Architecture and Design at MOCA and the first Director of Architecture and Design at the Palm Springs Art Museum in 2016.

== Early life ==
Hodge grew up in Kingston, Ontario, Canada. She received her Bachelor of Arts with honors in art history from Queen’s University in Kingston, Ontario, in 1983, and a Master's of Architectural History and a Certificate in Historic Preservation from the University of Virginia in 1989.

== Career ==
She began her career as a curatorial assistant at the Canadian Centre for Architecture (CCA) in 1985 and was promoted to exhibitions coordinator at the Canadian Centre for Architecture in Montreal. In 1990 Hodge curated "Buildings in Boxes," the first exhibition of the CCA's important collection of architectural toys and games, and was interviewed about it by JD Roberts on Canada AM. She served in that position from 1987 until 1991 when she joined the staff of the Harvard Graduate School of Design as director of lectures, exhibitions, and academic publications. Her role at Harvard expanded when she was named an adjunct curator of architecture and design at the Fogg Art Museum. She also served as Assistant Dean for Arts Programs at Harvard's Graduate School of Design. During her tenure at Harvard, Hodge curated and/or organized over 100 exhibitions and produced numerous scholarly publications on the subjects of architecture, urban design, and landscape architecture. Notably, the exhibition she organized of the work of architect Zaha Hadid traveled to New York's Grand Central Terminal in 1995 and was reviewed by New York Times' architecture critic Herbert Muschamp. Hodge also served as Lecturer in the school's department of architecture, teaching seminars and workshops at the graduate level.

She became the first curator or architecture and design at the Museum of Contemporary Art, Los Angeles in 2001. She was also responsible with programming the museum's location at the Pacific Design Center, which closed in 2019. Her first exhibit at the PDC was "What's Shakin'" which featured material related to building projects then in progress in the city, including Frank Gehry's Disney Hall, the Beverly Hills Prada Epicenter by OMA/Rem Koolhaas, and Rafael Moneo's Cathedral of Our Lady of the Angels. Her position at MOCA was eliminated in 2009 in the wake of that museum's significant financial problems.

In 2010, Hodge was named Director of Exhibitions and Publications at the Hammer Museum in Los Angeles where she oversaw the production of numerous exhibitions and publications including the first and second iterations of the Hammer's renowned Made in L.A. biennial, "Now Dig This!", "A. Quincy Jones: Building for Better Living", and "Take It or Leave It: Institution, Image, Ideology." Hodge also oversaw the product and design merchandising of the Hammer Store, including creating special branded product in connection with Made in L.A. During this period, she curated "Provocations: the work of Heatherwick Studio," which opened at the Nasher Sculpture Center in Dallas in 2014, traveled to the Hammer Museum in spring 2015, and concluded its tour at the Cooper Hewitt in summer 2015.

In 2014, she was named Deputy Director of the Cooper Hewitt Museum, National Design Museum in New York.

In 2016, she returned to the west coast and was named the first architecture and design director at Palm Springs Art Museum. At the museum, she was responsible for the programming and oversight of the Architecture and Design Center, the Edwards Harris Pavilion and the Frey House II, along with other important architecture initiatives of the museum. Hodge's position was eliminated in 2020 during the coronavirus pandemic.

Hodge continues to be based in Palm Springs and works as an independent curator and writer. In 2022, she was invited by Yale University Art Gallery to co-curate, with John Stuart Gordon, an exhibition devoted to the work of activist, educator, and graphic designer Sheila Levrant de Bretteville.

== Notable exhibitions ==
- Buildings in Boxes: Architectural Toys and Games from the collection of the Canadian Centre for Architecture. Canadian
- Retrofuturism: the car design of J Mays. Museum of Contemporary Art, Los Angeles (2002).
- Provocations: The Architecture and Design of Heatherwick Studio. Nasher Sculpture Center in Dallas (2014), Hammer Museum, Los Angeles (2015), Cooper Hewitt, National Design Museum, New York (2015).
