= Ferrari Luce =

Battery electric executive car

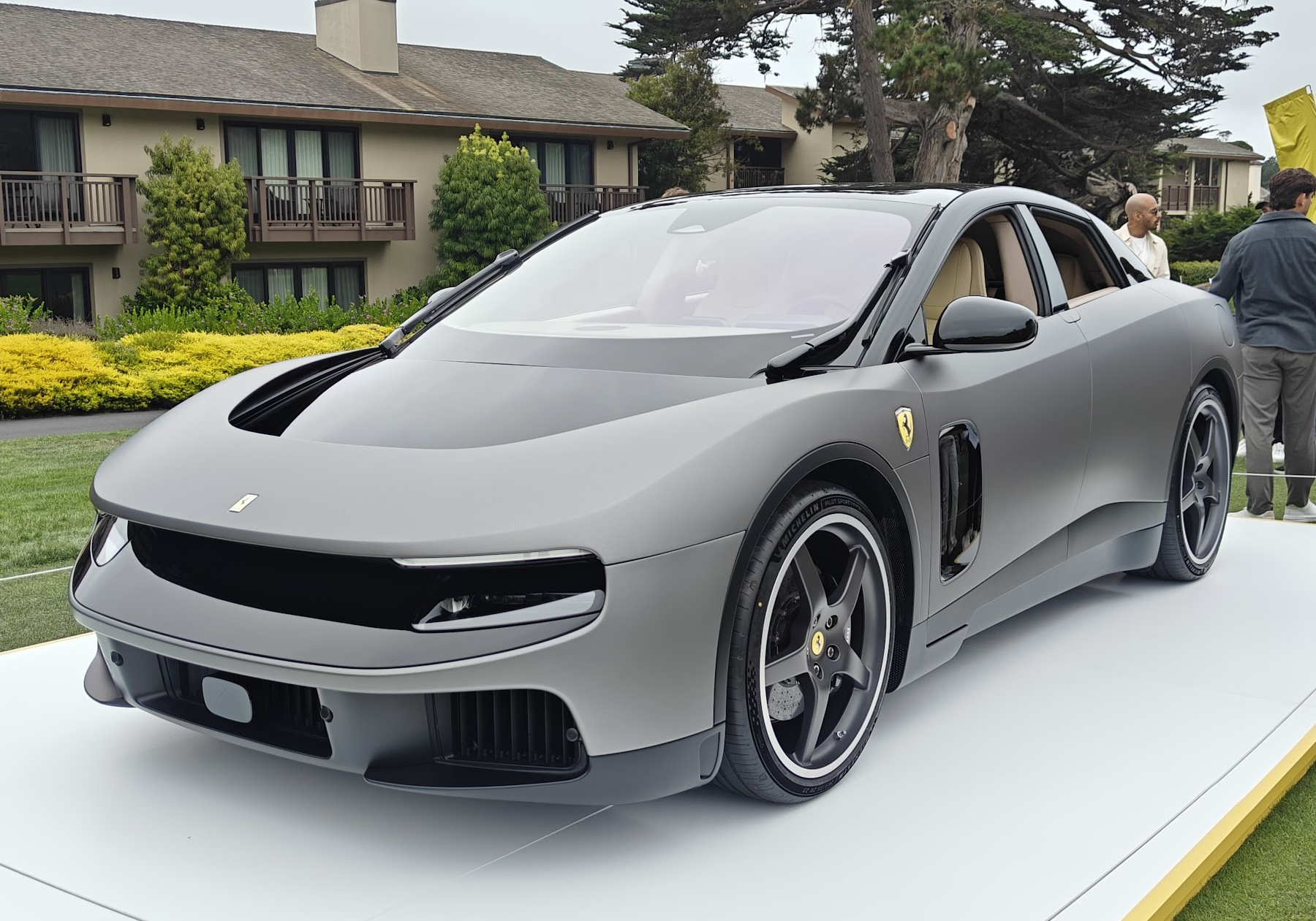

Overview
- Manufacturer: Ferrari
- Model code: F222
- Production: 2026–present
- Model years: 2027
- Assembly: Italy: Maranello
- Designer: Jony Ive and Marc Newson of LoveFrom in collaboration with Centro Stile Ferrari

Body and chassis
- Class: Grand tourer
- Body style: 5-door liftback saloon
- Layout: Quad-motor, all-wheel-drive
- Doors: Conventional doors (front); Coach doors (rear)

Powertrain
- Electric motor: 4× radial-flow permanent-synchronous motors
- Power output: 772 kW (1,050 PS; 1,035 hp)
- Battery: 800 V, 122-kWh NMC from SK On
- Range: 530 km (329 mi) (WLTP)
- Plug-in charging: 350 kW DC

Dimensions
- Wheelbase: 2,961 mm (116.6 in)
- Length: 5,026 mm (197.9 in)
- Width: 1,999 mm (78.7 in)
- Height: 1,544 mm (60.8 in)
- Kerb weight: 2,260 kg (4,982 lb)

The Ferrari Luce (Italian: [ˈluːtʃe]) (Type F222) is a battery electric GT produced by Italian automobile manufacturer Ferrari. After months of media speculation and a preview of the car’s interior styling, seats, steering wheel, dashboard controls, and user interface, the final design of the brand's first fully electric vehicle (EV) was unveiled in May 2026. In addition to being Ferrari's first production EV, Luce is also Ferrari's first and only five-seater, its first five-door liftback, and its first all-wheel-drive model.

== Overview ==
The car was previewed under the development name "Elettrica" during Ferrari's Capital Markets Day on 9 October 2025. The name Luce, meaning "light" in Italian, was confirmed prior to the production model’s reveal in May 2026.

Reuters reported that the Luce is priced at €550,000 in Europe, with customer deliveries due to begin in the fourth quarter of 2026.

The model is built and assembled in at Ferrari's Maranello factory using a dedicated EV architecture.

=== Powertrain ===
The Luce uses four permanent-magnet electric motors, one for each wheel, with a combined output of 772 kW (1,050 PS; 1,035 hp). The system is rear-biased, with the front motors producing a combined 210 kW (286 PS; 282 hp) and the rear motors producing 620 kW (843 PS; 831 hp).

Ferrari claims a 0–100 km/h (62 mph) time of 2.5 seconds and a top speed of more than 310 km/h (193 mph). The battery has a gross capacity of 122 kWh and its housing forms a structural element of the Luce's chassis. The car uses an 800 V electrical architecture and supports DC fast charging at up to 350 kW, with an estimated driving range of 530 kilometres (329 mi).

=== Features ===
The Luce is equipped with active suspension, four-wheel steering and torque vectoring.

Its cabin combines OLED digital displays with physical controls. Car and Driver reported that the steering wheel uses conventional switches instead of the touchpads fitted to some previous Ferrari models, and includes two manettino controls: one for vehicle dynamics and one for the electric powertrain. The central touchscreen is paired with physical switchgear, while paddles on the steering wheel control regenerative braking and torque delivery.

Ferrari developed a sound system for the Luce that captures mechanical noise from the electric drivetrain and amplifies it according to the selected driving mode, rather than using a simulated combustion-engine soundtrack. The system has been likened to the pickups of an electric guitar.

The company stated that Euro NCAP testing is in its performance target for the vehicle, potentially making it the first Ferrari and the most expensive vehicle to be tested for this safety standard.

=== Design ===
The Luce was developed on a dedicated EV architecture, allowing a body layout that differs from Ferrari's previous combustion-engine models. The exterior and interior were shaped in collaboration with LoveFrom, the creative collective founded by Jony Ive and Marc Newson, alongside Ferrari's own design studio and engineering teams.

Car and Driver described the Luce as longer but lower than the Ferrari Purosangue, with centre-opening doors, a rear liftgate, a forward-set cabin and lighting elements integrated into dark body panels.

Corriere della Sera compared the design to the late 1990s Fiat Multipla and Ford 021C (also designed by Newson), both of which anticipate various aspects of the car's styling.

Others have pondered how much of Apple's aborted $10 billion Project Titan EV has filtered into the design, while Domus magazine described the Luce as "an Apple product you can sit inside".

== Reception ==
The Luce was unveiled on 25 May 2026 during a "tightly-controlled" event attended by around 200 journalists at the Città dello sport, a Santiago Calatrava designed sports complex on the outskirts of Rome. Pope Leo XIV was shown the Luce a day after the car's initial Roman reveal. Italy's president, Sergio Mattarella, was also given a private viewing of the car at the Quirinale Palace. Fans' expectations for the design were high, with many believing it would be similar to the Ferrari F76, a digital hypercar only available as an NFT.

The car received a poor reception after its reveal, with much of the discussion focused on the Luce's styling and its role as Ferrari's first battery-electric production model. The Guardian described the design as divisive, and reported that some analysts questioned whether the model's saloon-like form matched Ferrari's traditional sports-car image. Ferrari fans and car enthusiasts strongly criticised the car's design, with its many detractors dismissing the car unworthy of Ferrari's prancing horse badge. Responding to the many negative reviews, Dezeen published a podcast on the Luce titled, "Why does everyone seem to hate the new electric Ferrari?"

Former Ferrari CEO Luca di Montezemolo voiced his unequivocally negative opinion of the design, equating it to the "destruction of a legend", saying that the Luce was "certainly a machine that the Chinese won't copy—they won't need to.” The day after the Luce was unveiled, Ferrari's share price dropped by 8.4% on the Milan stock market, although the price recovered several days later.

The design also has its admirers, with the interior detailing and dashboard being described by Design Burger as a "masterclass" that creates a "sensory experience that's impossible not to enjoy". Writing for Top Gear, designer Frank Stephenson (who designed the Ferrari F430, Fiat 500, and McLaren P1) observed that, "The details and their execution reflect a fabulous level of quality, the whole interior comes across as being designed by a product designer suffering from OCD, and it’s very suited to a comfy family car."

=== Sales ===
Despite generally negative sentiment towards the design, Luce's initial 2026 production run sold out rapidly, making it a sales success for Ferrari. The car went on sale in China (which is viewed as an increasingly difficult market for European brands) on 27 June 2026 with 88 units, all of which also quickly sold out.

American billionaire Herbert Wertheim bought the first production Luce at auction during the 2026 Monterey Car Week. According to RM Sotheby's, his winning bid of USD 40 million made "Luce Chassis 0" the costliest charity car ever sold at auction, as well as the world's most expensive EV and most expensive new car.
