= Ressence =

Watch manufacturer

RESSENCE
- Type: Independent
- Industry: Watchmaking
- Genre: Private
- Founded: Antwerp, Belgium (2010)
- Founder: Benoît Mintiens
- Headquarters: Antwerp, Belgium and Geneva, Switzerland
- Area served: Worldwide
- Products: Luxury watches
- Website: ressencewatches.com

RESSENCE is a watch manufacturer founded in 2010 by Benoît Mintiens in Antwerp, Belgium. The brand name is a portmanteau of "Renaissance" and "essence".

== Concept ==
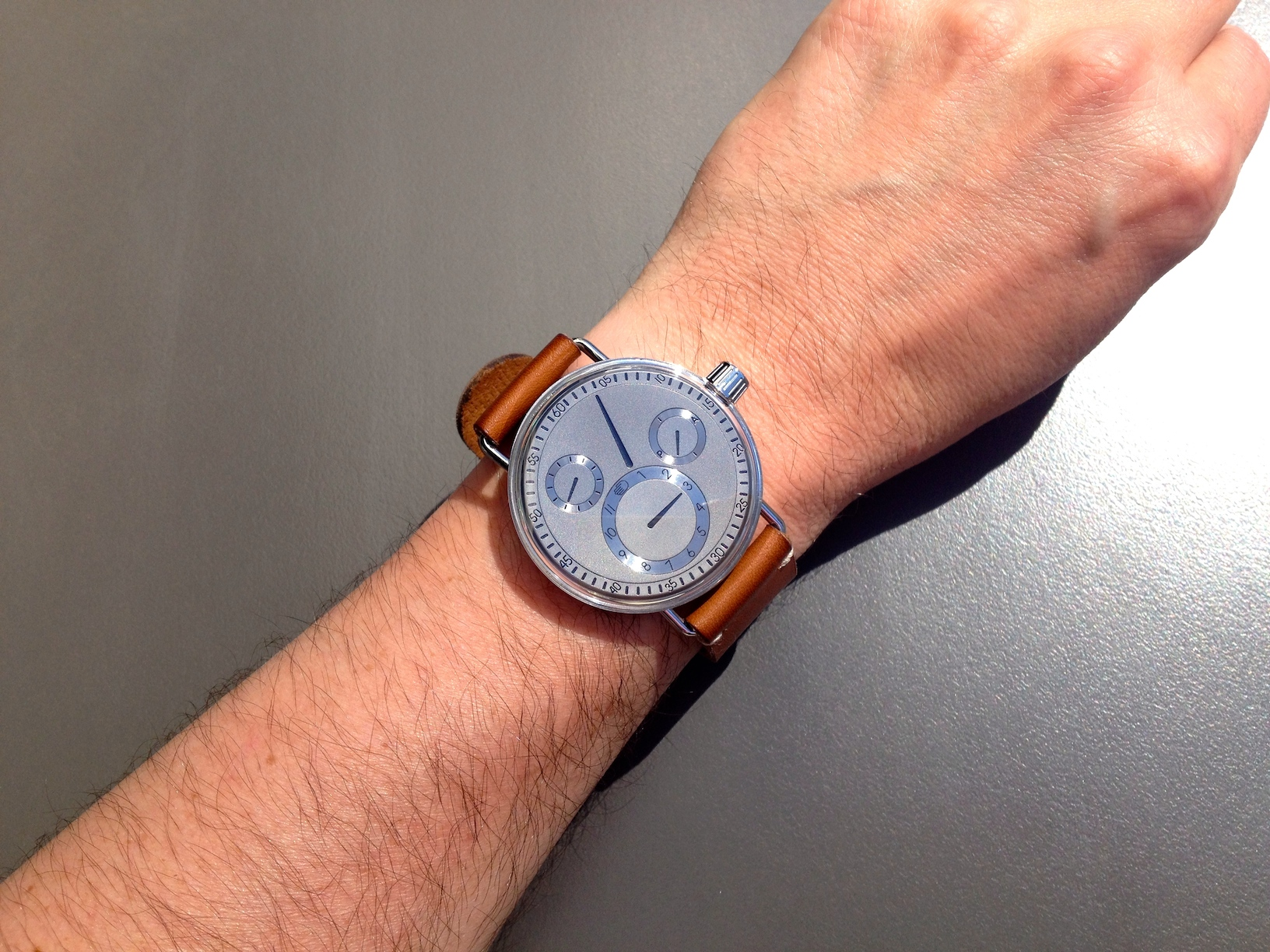
a SeriesOne TYPE1002 model.

The particularity of Ressence’s patented time display system is that all graphical elements that form the dial lie in one co-planar surface very close under the sapphire glass, including the digits and the graphical hands. To indicate the time, the ‘mechanical display module’ is composed of discs and rings that orbit around each other. Functions of the first and second lines are: AM/PM, hours, minutes and seconds. Although a number of people have commented that the watch is too difficult to read, some watch reporters have compared the watch design to that of Apple because of its combination of simplicity and functionality Because of the prominence of the minutes' hand, the watch is sometimes referred to as a regulator model. The co-planar rotating discs and rings are engraved and filled up with Super-LumiNova, although silver or titanium models with black versions of the material cannot be read in the dark despite the special paint. The automatic module uses a modified mechanical automatic Swiss Made caliber from ETA S.A. to power it.

The use of rotating discs is no novelty per se, as in the 1970s various watches were introduced that used discs as opposed to hands to indicate time. Although few of these were popular, Seiko's limited edition "Discus Burger" from its 2007 "Moving Design" series — more or less a copy of the SWA0017 model brought out by Swatch in 1994 but with an extra seconds disc — continues to be very popular with collectors. The Discus Burger, which came out in black and white, uses discs with digital-type hour and minute markings that rotate on top of each other much like hands would. A small window at nine o'clock in the otherwise plain unmarked dial shows the time. Mintiens' idea of having the entire dial rotate clock-wise in which co-planar sub-dials with indexes orbit around a virtual axle was new. In 2010, Harry Winston introduced "Opus X" based on a comparable animation, but aesthetically and mechanically the concepts are different. One major difference lies in the fact that Opus X uses hands of different sizes and shapes to indicate time.

== Development ==
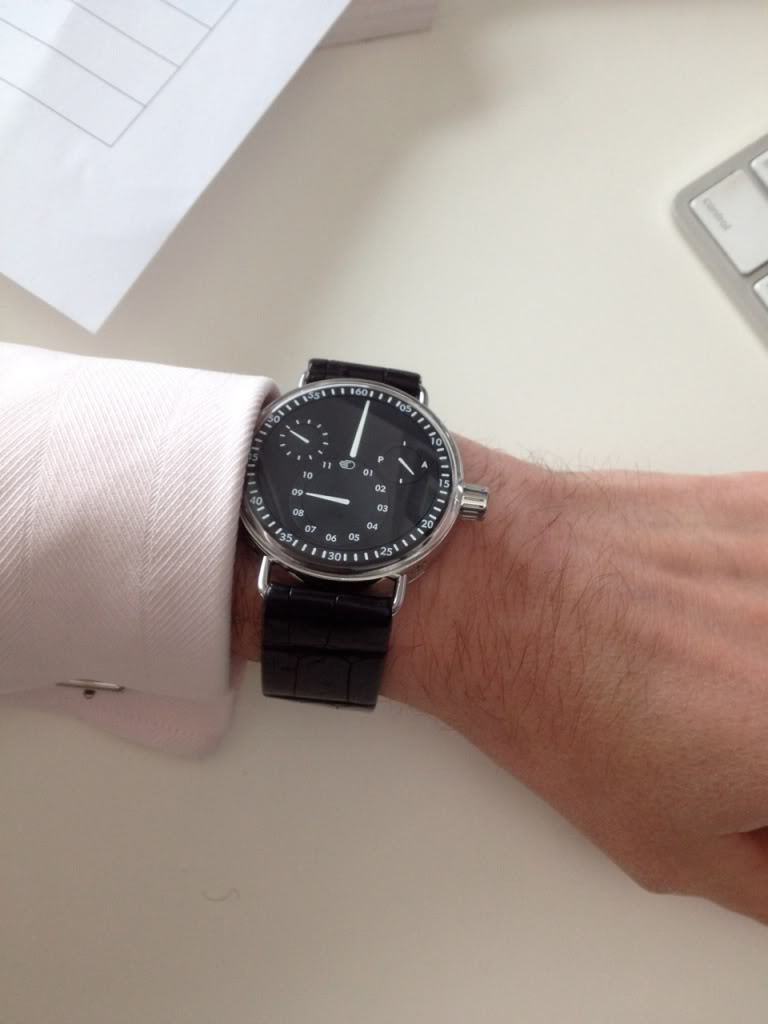
a ZeroSeries TYPE1001 model

The Ressence line was introduced at the BaselWorld watch fair in 2010, displaying 3 prototypes. During the spring of 2011 a first production of 50 watches, the so-called "ZeroSeries" was launched. In early 2012 the "SeriesOne" was introduced. The latter series offered an upgrade to the zero series, with the omission of screws to hold the back sapphire, downturned lugs and a shock absorption system besides small changes to the time module. The ZeroSeries were assembled by VRJ in Waterloo, Belgium. For the assembly of SeriesOne, Ressence started collaboration with Montres Ludovic Ballouard in Geneva, Switzerland. At the World Exhibition in 2011 in Geneva (Geneva Time Exhibition) Ressence watches were awarded a “special mention” from the jury. In 2012, it was also considered Watch of the Year for innovation by WatchPro. The third series, "Type 3", was introduced at the 2013 edition of the BaselWorld watch fair in May 2013. Because it is one of the first watches to come without a crown, CBS News's Techcrunch reported on the new model as a possible future direction in watches. In November 2013, the Ressence Type 3 was voted 2013 Men's Watch of the Year by the Belgian newspaper, Le Soir, and awarded the Horological Revelation Prize at the Grand Prix d’Horlogerie de Genève. In 2016, The Fondation de la Haute Horlogerie has certified that Ressence meets Haute Horlogerie standards of excellence, the techniques of watchmaking in symbiosis with the applied arts. The FHH assigned this evaluation to its Cultural Council of 46 independent, international experts who carried out their function with complete impartiality and on a pro bono basis.

== Type 1 ==
At BaselWorld 2014, Ressence revealed a new line-up of Type 1 watches that have no crown, a slightly flatter case, and inwards-pointing lugs. The new lugs would fit smaller straps, an aspect indicating an intention to expand into the Asian market. Another important new feature was the functionality of the small indicator disc, which no longer indicates AM/PM, but, instead, the day of the week. To wind the watch, the bottom crystal must be rotated when the watch is placed upside down. At SIHH in 2017, a cushion-cased Type 1 Squared version of the watch was released. At 11.5mm it is the thinnest of all models yet and allows the time to be set using a retractable level. At the Basel watch fair later that year, a limited-edition (20 pcs) skeleton version of its "regular" Type 1 model was released in collaboration with NY-based watch website Hodinkee.

== Type 3 ==
In 2013, Ressence revealed the 44mm Type 3. It features two separate sealed chambers, one filled with 3.75 mL of oil below the dial, and the other containing the base caliber filled with air. An extra side ring is added to indicate the days of the month. The upper half, which is filled with oil, allows the lume indicators below the crystal to seemingly float on top of the crystal. Ressence won the Horological Revelation prize at the Grand Prix d'Horlogerie de Genève for the Type 3 movement, the first ever oil filled watch.

== Type 5 ==
In December 2015, Ressence revealed its Type 5 model. This 46mm titanium watch is based on the partly oil-filled module used in the Type 3, but further developed as a diving watch that benefits from extreme visibility under water. The use of oil cancels out total internal reflection, making the Type 5 readable underwater regardless of the viewing angle.
