= Miss Puerto Rico =

National beauty title in Puerto Rico competing internationally

- Formation: 1952
- Type: Beauty pageant
- Headquarters: San Juan
- Location: Puerto Rico
- Members: Miss Universe; Miss America; Miss World; Miss International; Miss Earth; Miss Supranational; Miss Grand International; Miss Intercontinental; Miss Global; Miss Charm; Miss Cosmo
- Official language: Spanish; English
- Award: 17 Major Titles Won: 5 Miss Universe 1970, 1985, 1993, 2001, 2006; 2 Miss World 1975, 2016; 2 Miss International 1987, 2014; 1 Miss Earth 2019; 1 Miss Supranational 2018; 1 Miss Grand International 2013; 5 Miss Intercontinental 1986, 1991, (Note: Miss Intercontinental was held twice in 1991. Carmen Lynda Díaz from Puerto Rico won the first edition held in Lagos, Nigeria by Nigerian owners of the pageant, Silver Productions, which held the franchise from 1986 to 1991, and Elena Ivanova from Russia won the second edition held in Bonn, Germany by organizers working under the direction of the new owners of the pageant, a company from Germany, which held the competition in Europe from 1991 to 2003. See Miss Intercontinental Puerto Rico.) 2010, 2016 2024

Miss Puerto Rico is a national title bestowed on the women representing the archipelago and island of Puerto Rico in international beauty pageants.

Although an American territory, Puerto Rico participates in international sports competitions and beauty pageants under the flag of Puerto Rico as an entity separate from the United States. As in the Olympic Games since 1948 and the Pan American Games since 1955, it has competed independently in beauty pageants since 1952, when its representative debuted in Miss Universe as Miss Puerto Rico.

In 1987, Puerto Rico became the ninth nation or territory to win Miss Universe, Miss World and Miss International, the three oldest pageants. In 2019, it won Miss Earth, becoming the fourth to win the major Big Four beauty pageants. In 2019, having previously won Miss Supranational and Miss Grand International, the contests constituting the six major Grand Slam pageants together with the Big Four, it also became the first nation to win all said pageants. When Miss Intercontinental, the oldest other pageant, is included, Puerto Rico is also the first to win all said seven pageants.

With 17 combined wins as of 2024 in the pageants mentioned above, Puerto Rico is considered a pageant "powerhouse". It is the fourth nation or territory globally with the most combined wins in these groups except in the Grand Slam, where it is the fifth globally. It is also the second Ibero-American nation or territory with the most combined wins in these groups.

Beauty pageants are a part of the culture of Puerto Rico. The businesswoman in the modeling and beauty industry in charge of many Puerto Rican representatives competing internationally between 1952 and 1998, Anna Santisteban, popularly known as the Hacedora de Reinas (Maker of Queens), is often recognized as the most influential promoter of pageants in the archipelago. As the holder of the Miss Universe franchise in Puerto Rico, Santisteban produced three international winners: 1970, 1985, and 1993. She also produced one Miss International: 1987.

== Ibero-America and world rankings ==
=== World by year of complete achievement ===
==== Miss Universe, Miss World and Miss International ====
The following nations and territories, in order of achievement year, have won Miss Universe, Miss World and Miss International:

Complete Achievement in Miss Universe, Miss World and Miss International
Rank	Year Achieved	Entity	Sum	Miss Universe	Miss World	Miss International
1	1965	Germany	6	1961	1956•1980 (Note: Crowned as winner but was replaced by first runner-up after resignation or dethronement.)	1965•1989; 2022
2	1967	Argentina	4	1962	1960•1978	1967
3	1971	Brazil	4	1963•1968	1971	1968
4	1972	Australia	7	1972•2004	1968•1972	1962•1982; 1992
5	1973	Finland	4	1952•1975	1957	1973
6	1974	United States	15	1954•1956; 1960•1967; 1980•1995; 1997•2012; 2022	1973•1990; 2010	1974•1978; 1982
7	1976	France	4	1953•2016	1953	1976
8	1985	Venezuela	22	1979•1981; 1986•1996; 2008•2009; 2013	1955•1981; 1984•1991; 1995•2011	1985•1997; 2000•2003; 2006•2010; 2015•2018; 2023
9	1987	Puerto Rico	9	1970•1985; 1993•2001; 2006	1975•2016	1987•2014
10	1989	Netherlands	4	1989	1959•1962	1961
11	1996	Greece	3	1964	1996	1994
12	2013	Philippines	11	1969•1973; 2015•2018	2013	1964•1970; 1979•2005; 2013•2016
13	2015	Spain	5	1974	2015	1977•1990; 2008
14	2018	Mexico	7	1991•2010; 2020•2025	2018	2007•2009
15	2025	Thailand	4	1965•1988	2025	2019

==== Miss Universe, Miss World, Miss International and Miss Earth ====
The following nations and territories, in order of achievement year, have won Miss Universe, Miss World, Miss International and Miss Earth, often collectively known as the Big Four:

Complete Achievement in Miss Universe, Miss World, Miss International and Miss Earth
Rank	Year Achieved	Entity	Sum	Miss Universe	Miss World	Miss International	Miss Earth
1	2004	Brazil	6	1963•1968	1971	1968	2004•2009
2	2005	Venezuela	24	1979•1981; 1986•1996; 2008•2009; 2013	1955•1981; 1984•1991; 1995•2011	1985•1997; 2000•2003; 2006•2010; 2015•2018; 2023	2005•2013
3	2013	Philippines	15	1969•1973; 2015•2018	2013	1964•1970; 1979•2005; 2013•2016	2008•2014; 2015•2017
4	2019	Puerto Rico	10	1970•1985; 1993•2001; 2006	1975•2016	1987•2014	2019
5	2020	United States	16	1954•1956; 1960•1967; 1980•1995; 1997•2012; 2022	1973•1990; 2010	1974•1978; 1982	2020
6	2024	Australia	8	1972•2004	1968•1972	1962•1982; 1992	2024

==== Miss Universe, Miss World, Miss International, Miss Earth, Miss Supranational and Miss Grand International ====
The following nations and territories, in order of achievement year, has won Miss Universe, Miss World, Miss International, Miss Earth, Miss Supranational and Miss Grand International, often collectively known as the Grand Slam:

Complete Achievement in Miss Universe, Miss World, Miss International, Miss Earth, Miss Supranational and Miss Grand International
Rank	Year Achieved	Entity	Sum	Miss Universe	Miss World	Miss International	Miss Earth	Miss Supra- national	Miss Grand Inter- national
1	2019	Puerto Rico	12	1970•1985; 1993•2001; 2006	1975•2016	1987•2014	2019	2018	2013
2	2024	Philippines	19	1969•1973; 2015•2018	2013	1964•1970; 1979•2005; 2013•2016	2008•2014; 2015•2017	2013•2026	2024 (Note: Finished as first runner-up but succeeded winner after resignation or dethronement.)•2025
3	2025	Brazil	8	1963•1968	1971	1968	2004•2009	2025	2022

==== Miss Universe, Miss World, Miss International, Miss Earth, Miss Supranational, Miss Grand International and Miss Intercontinental ====
The following nations and territories, in order of achievement year, has won Miss Universe, Miss World, Miss International, Miss Earth, Miss Supranational, Miss Grand International and Miss Intercontinental:

Complete Achievement in Miss Universe, Miss World, Miss International, Miss Earth, Miss Supranational, Miss Grand International and Miss Intercontinental
Rank	Year Achieved	Entity	Sum	Miss Universe	Miss World	Miss International	Miss Earth	Miss Supra- national	Miss Grand Inter- national	Miss Inter- continental
1	2019	Puerto Rico	17	1970•1985; 1993•2001; 2006	1975•2016	1987•2014	2019	2018	2013	1986•1991; 2010•2016; 2024
2	2024	Philippines	21	1969•1973; 2015•2018	2013	1964•1970; 1979•2005; 2013•2016	2008•2014; 2015•2017	2013•2026	2024•2025	2018•2021
3	2025	Brazil	11	1963•1968	1971	1968	2004•2009	2025	2022	1972•1981; 1998

=== Ibero-America by number of titles ===
==== Miss Universe, Miss World and Miss International ====
The nations of Ibero-America, in order of number of titles won, have performed as follows in Miss Universe, Miss World and Miss International:

Titles Won by Ibero-American Nations in Miss Universe, Miss World and Miss International
Rank	Entity	Sum	Miss Universe	Miss World	Miss International
1	Venezuela	22	1979•1981; 1986•1996; 2008•2009; 2013	1955•1981; 1984•1991; 1995•2011	1985•1997; 2000•2003; 2006•2010; 2015•2018; 2023
2	Puerto Rico	9	1970•1985; 1993•2001; 2006	1975•2016	1987•2014
3	Mexico	7	1991•2010; 2020•2025	2018	2007•2009
4	Colombia	6	1958•2014	0	1960•1999; 2004•2025
5	Spain	5	1974	2015	1977•1990; 2008
6	Brazil	4	1963•1968	1971	1968
7	Argentina	4	1962	1960•1978	1967
8	Dominican Republic	3	2003	1982 • 2026	0
8	Peru	3	1957	1967•2004	0
9	Panama	2	2002	0	1998
10	Costa Rica	2	0	0	1980•1983
11	Chile	1	1987	0	0
11	Nicaragua	1	2023	0	0
12	Ecuador	1	0	0	2011
12	Guatemala	1	0	0	1984
12	Portugal	1	0	0	1996
13	Andorra	0	0	0	0
13	Bolivia	0	0	0	0
13	Cuba	0	0	0	0
13	El Salvador	0	0	0	0
13	Honduras	0	0	0	0
13	Paraguay	0	0	0	0
13	Uruguay	0	0	0	0

==== Miss Universe, Miss World, Miss International and Miss Earth ====
The nations of Ibero-America, in order of number of titles won, have performed as follows in Miss Universe, Miss World, Miss International, and Miss Earth, often collectively known as the Big Four:

Titles Won by Ibero-American Nations in Miss Universe, Miss World, Miss International and Miss Earth
Rank	Entity	Sum	Miss Universe	Miss World	Miss International	Miss Earth
1	Venezuela	24	1979•1981; 1986•1996; 2008•2009; 2013	1955•1981; 1984•1991; 1995•2011	1985•1997; 2000•2003; 2006•2010; 2015•2018; 2023	2005•2013
2	Puerto Rico	10	1970•1985; 1993•2001; 2006	1975•2016	1987•2014	2019
3	Mexico	7	1991•2010; 2020•2025	2018	2007•2009	0
4	Brazil	6	1963•1968	1971	1968	2004•2009
5	Colombia	6	1958•2014	0	1960•1999; 2004•2025	0
6	Spain	5	1974	2015	1977•1990; 2008	0
7	Argentina	4	1962	1960•1978	1967	0
8	Dominican Republic	3	2003	1982 • 2026	0	0
8	Peru	3	1957	1967•2004	0	0
9	Ecuador	3	0	0	2011	2011•2016
10	Panama	2	2002	0	1998	0
11	Chile	2	1987	0	0	2006
12	Costa Rica	2	0	0	1980•1983	0
13	Nicaragua	1	2023	0	0	0
14	Guatemala	1	0	0	1984	0
14	Portugal	1	0	0	1996	0
15	Honduras	1	0	0	0	2003
17	Andorra	0	0	0	0	0
17	Bolivia	0	0	0	0	0
17	Cuba	0	0	0	0	0
17	El Salvador	0	0	0	0	0
17	Paraguay	0	0	0	0	0
17	Uruguay	0	0	0	0	0

==== Miss Universe, Miss World, Miss International, Miss Earth, Miss Supranational and Miss Grand International ====
The nations of Ibero-America, in order of number of titles won, have performed as follows in Miss Universe, Miss World, Miss International, Miss Earth, Miss Supranational, and Miss Grand International, often collectively known in the as the Grand Slam:

Titles Won by Ibero-American Nations in Miss Universe, Miss World, Miss International, Miss Earth, Miss Supranational and Miss Grand International
Rank	Entity	Sum	Miss Universe	Miss World	Miss International	Miss Earth	Miss Supra- national	Miss Grand Inter- national
1	Venezuela	25	1979•1981; 1986•1996; 2008•2009; 2013	1955•1981; 1984•1991; 1995•2011	1985•1997; 2000•2003; 2006•2010; 2015•2018; 2023	2005•2013	0	2019
2	Puerto Rico	12	1970•1985; 1993•2001; 2006	1975•2016	1987•2014	2019	2018	2013
3	Brazil	8	1963•1968	1971	1968	2004•2009	2025	2022
4	Mexico	7	1991•2010; 2020•2025	2018	2007•2009	0	0	0
5	Colombia	6	1958•2014	0	1960•1999; 2004•2025	0	0	0
6	Peru	5	1957	1967•2004	0	0	0	2017•2023
7	Spain	5	1974	2015	1977•1990; 2008	0	0	0
8	Argentina	4	1962	1960•1978	1967	0	0	0
9	Dominican Republic	4	2003	1982 • 2026	0	0	0	2015
10	Ecuador	4	0	0	2011	2011•2016	2023	0
11	Panama	3	2002	0	1998	0	2009	0
12	Chile	2	1987	0	0	2006	0	0
13	Costa Rica	2	0	0	1980•1983	0	0	0
14	Paraguay	2	0	0	0	0	2015	2018
15	Nicaragua	1	2023	0	0	0	0	0
16	Guatemala	1	0	0	1984	0	0	0
16	Portugal	1	0	0	1996	0	0	0
17	Honduras	1	0	0	0	2003	0	0
18	Cuba	1	0	0	0	0	0	2014
19	Andorra	0	0	0	0	0	0	0
19	Bolivia	0	0	0	0	0	0	0
19	El Salvador	0	0	0	0	0	0	0
19	Uruguay	0	0	0	0	0	0	0

==== Miss Universe, Miss World, Miss International, Miss Earth, Miss Supranational, Miss Grand International and Miss Intercontinental ====
The nations of Ibero-America, in order of number of titles won, have performed as follows in Miss Universe, Miss World, Miss International, Miss Earth, Miss Supranational, Miss Grand International and Miss Intercontinental:

Titles Won by Ibero-American Nations in Miss Universe, Miss World, Miss International, Miss Earth, Miss Supranational, Miss Grand International and Miss Intercontinental
Rank	Entity	Sum	Miss Universe	Miss World	Miss International	Miss Earth	Miss Supra- national	Miss Grand Inter- national	Miss Inter- continental
1	Venezuela	30	1979•1981; 1986•1996; 2008•2009; 2013	1955•1981; 1984•1991; 1995•2011	1985•1997; 2000•2003; 2006•2010; 2015•2018; 2023	2005•2013	0	2019	1974•2001; 2005•2009; 2012
2	Puerto Rico	17	1970•1985; 1993•2001; 2006	1975•2016	1987•2014	2019	2018	2013	1986•1991; 2010•2016; 2024
3	Brazil	11	1963•1968	1971	1968	2004•2009	2025	2022	1972•1981; 1998
4	Mexico	8	1991•2010; 2020•2025	2018	2007•2009	0	0	0	2017
5	Colombia	8	1958•2014	0	1960•1999; 2004•2025	0	0	0	2004•2008
6	Peru	7	1957	1967•2004	0	0	0	2017•2023	1971•1987
7	Dominican Republic	6	2003	1982 • 2026	0	0	0	2015	1985•1989
8	Argentina	5	1962	1960•1978	1967	0	0	0	1980
9	Spain	5	1974	2015	1977•1990; 2008	0	0	0	0
10	Ecuador	4	0	0	2011	2011•2016	2023	0	0
11	Panama	3	2002	0	1998	0	2010	0	0
12	Chile	2	1987	0	0	2006	0	0	0
13	Nicaragua	2	2023	0	0	0	0	0	1976
14	Costa Rica	2	0	0	1980•1983	0	0	0	0
15	Paraguay	2	0	0	0	0	2015	2018	0
16	Guatemala	1	0	0	1984	0	0	0	0
16	Portugal	1	0	0	1996	0	0	0	0
17	Honduras	1	0	0	0	2003	0	0	0
18	Cuba	1	0	0	0	0	0	2014	0
19	Andorra	0	0	0	0	0	0	0	0
19	Bolivia	0	0	0	0	0	0	0	0
19	El Salvador	0	0	0	0	0	0	0	0
19	Uruguay	0	0	0	0	0	0	0	0

=== World by number of titles ===
==== Miss Universe, Miss World and Miss International ====
The following nations and territories, in order of number of titles won, have won more times in Miss Universe, Miss World and Miss International:

Titles Won in Miss Universe, Miss World and Miss International
Rank	Entity	Sum	Miss Universe	Miss World	Miss International
1	Venezuela	22	1979•1981; 1986•1996; 2008•2009; 2013	1955•1981; 1984•1991; 1995•2011	1985•1997; 2000•2003; 2006•2010; 2015•2018; 2023
2	United States	15	1954•1956; 1960•1967; 1980•1995; 1997•2012; 2022	1973•1990; 2010	1974•1978; 1982
3	Philippines	11	1969•1973; 2015•2018	2013	1964•1970; 1979•2005; 2013•2016
4	Puerto Rico	9	1970•1985; 1993•2001; 2006	1975•2016	1987•2014
5	India	9	1994•2000; 2021	1966•1994; 1997•1999; 2000•2017	0
6	Mexico	7	1991•2010; 2020•2025	2018	2007•2009
7	Australia	7	1972•2004	1968•1972	1962•1982; 1992
8	United Kingdom	7	0	1961•1964; 1965•1974; 1983	1969•1972
9	South Africa	6	1978•2017; 2019	1958•1974; 2014	0
9	Sweden	6	1955•1966; 1984	1951•1952; 1977	0
10	Colombia	6	1958•2014	0	1960•1999; 2004•2025
11	Germany	6	1961	1956•1980	1965•1989; 2022
12	Spain	5	1974	2015	1977•1990; 2008
13	Poland	5	0	1989•2021	1991•1993; 2001

==== Miss Universe, Miss World, Miss International and Miss Earth ====
The following nations and territories, in order of number of titles won, have won more times in Miss Universe, Miss World, Miss International and Miss Earth, often collectively known as the Big Four:

Titles Won in Miss Universe, Miss World, Miss International and Miss Earth
Rank	Entity	Sum	Miss Universe	Miss World	Miss International	Miss Earth
1	Venezuela	24	1979•1981; 1986•1996; 2008•2009; 2013	1955•1981; 1984•1991; 1995•2011	1985•1997; 2000•2003; 2006•2010; 2015•2018; 2023	2005•2013
2	United States	16	1954•1956; 1960•1967; 1980•1995; 1997•2012; 2022	1973•1990; 2010	1974•1978; 1982	2020
3	Philippines	15	1969•1973; 2015•2018	2013	1964•1970; 1979•2005; 2013•2016	2008•2014; 2015•2017
4	Puerto Rico	10	1970•1985; 1993•2001; 2006	1975•2016	1987•2014	2019
5	India	10	1994•2000; 2021	1966•1994; 1997•1999; 2000•2017	0	2010
6	Australia	8	1972•2004	1968•1972	1962•1982; 1992	2024
7	Mexico	7	1991•2010; 2020•2025	2018	2007•2009	0
8	United Kingdom	7	0	1961•1964; 1965•1974; 1983	1969•1972	0
9	South Africa	6	1978•2017; 2019	1958•1974; 2014	0	0
9	Sweden	6	1955•1966; 1984	1951•1952; 1977	0	0
10	Brazil	6	1963•1968	1971	1968	2004•2009
11	Colombia	6	1958•2014	0	1960•1999; 2004•2025	0
12	Germany	6	1961	1956•1980	1965•1989; 2022	0
13	Spain	5	1974	2015	1977•1990; 2008	0
14	Poland	5	0	1989•2021	1991•1993; 2001	0

==== Miss Universe, Miss World, Miss International, Miss Earth, Miss Supranational and Miss Grand International ====
The following 70 nations, in order of number of titles won, have managed to win at least once in Miss Universe, Miss World, Miss International, Miss Earth, Miss Supranational or Miss Grand International, often collectively known as the Grand Slam:

Titles Won in Miss Universe, Miss World, Miss International, Miss Earth, Miss Supranational and Miss Grand International
Rank	Entity	Sum	Miss Universe	Miss World	Miss International	Miss Earth	Miss Supra- national	Miss Grand Inter- national
1	Venezuela	25	1979•1981; 1986•1996; 2008•2009; 2013	1955•1981; 1984•1991; 1995•2011	1985•1997; 2000•2003; 2006•2010; 2015•2018; 2023	2005•2013	0	2019
2	Philippines	19	1969•1973; 2015•2018	2013	1964•1970; 1979•2005; 2013•2016	2008•2014; 2015•2017	2013•2026	2024•2025
3	United States	17	1954•1956; 1960•1967; 1980•1995; 1997•2012; 2022	1973•1990; 2010	1974•1978; 1982	2020	0	2020
4	India	13	1994•2000; 2021	1966•1994; 1997•1999; 2000•2017	0	2010	2014•2016	2024
5	Puerto Rico	12	1970•1985; 1993•2001; 2006	1975•2016	1987•2014	2019	2018	2013
6	Australia	9	1972•2004	1968•1972	1962•1982; 1992	2024	0	2015
7	Brazil	8	1963•1968	1971	1968	2004•2009	2025	2022
8	Mexico	7	1991•2010; 2020•2025	2018	2007•2009	0	0	0
9	South Africa	7	1978•2017; 2019	1958•1974; 2014	0	0	2022	0
10	United Kingdom	7	0	1961•1964; 1965•1974; 1983	1969•1972	0	0	0
11	Sweden	6	1955•1966; 1984	1951•1952; 1977	0	0	0	0
12	Colombia	6	1958•2014	0	1960•1999; 2004•2025	0	0	0
13	Germany	6	1961	1956•1980	1965•1989; 2022	0	0	0
14	Poland	6	0	1989•2021	1991•1993; 2001	0	2011	0
15	Thailand	5	1965•1988	2025	2019	0	2019	0
16	Peru	5	1957	1967•2004	0	0	0	2017•2023
17	Spain	5	1974	2015	1977•1990; 2008	0	0	0
18	France	4	1953•2016	1953	1976	0	0	0
18	Finland	4	1952•1975	1957	1973	0	0	0
19	Argentina	4	1962	1960•1978	1967	0	0	0
19	Netherlands	4	1989	1959•1962	1961	0	0	0
20	Dominican Republic	4	2003	1982 • 2026	0	0	0	2015
21	Jamaica	4	0	1963•1976; 1993•2019	0	0	0	0
22	Iceland	4	0	1985•1988; 2005	1963	0	0	0
23	Czech Republic	4	0	2006•2023	0	2012•2025	0	0
24	Ecuador	4	0	0	2011	2011•2016	2023	0
25	Trinidad and Tobago	3	1977•1998	1986	0	0	0	0
26	Japan	3	1959•2007	0	2012	0	0	0
27	Canada	3	1982•2005	0	0	2007	0	0
278	Russia	3	2002	1992•2008	0	0	0	0
29	Greece	3	1964	1996	1994	0	0	0
30	Norway	3	1990	0	1988•1995	0	0	0
31	Panama	3	2002	0	1998	0	2010	0
32	Vietnam	3	0	0	2024	2018	0	2021
33	Indonesia	3	0	0	2017	0	2024	2016
34	Israel	2	1976	1998	0	0	0	0
35	Lebanon	2	1971	0	2002	0	0	0
35	New Zealand	2	1983	0	1971	0	0	0
36	Chile	2	1987	0	0	2006	0	0
36	Denmark	2	2024	0	0	2001	0	0
37	Namibia	2	1992	0	0	0	2021	0
38	Austria	2	0	1969•1987	0	0	0	0
38	China	2	0	2007•2012	0	0	0	0
39	Costa Rica	2	0	0	1980•1983	0	0	0
40	South Korea	2	0	0	0	2022	2017	0
41	Paraguay	2	0	0	0	0	2015	2018
42	Angola	1	2011	0	0	0	0	0
42	Botswana	1	1999	0	0	0	0	0
42	Nicaragua	1	2023	0	0	0	0	0
43	Bermuda	1	0	1979	0	0	0	0
43	Egypt	1	0	1954	0	0	0	0
43	Gibraltar	1	0	2009	0	0	0	0
43	Grenada	1	0	1970	0	0	0	0
43	Guam	1	0	1980	0	0	0	0
43	Ireland	1	0	2003	0	0	0	0
43	Nigeria	1	0	2001	0	0	0	0
43	Turkey	1	0	2002	0	0	0	0
44	England	1	0	0	1986	0	0	0
44	Guatemala	1	0	0	1984	0	0	0
44	Portugal	1	0	0	1996	0	0	0
44	Yugoslavia	1	0	0	1975	0	0	0
45	Albania	1	0	0	0	2023	0	0
45	Belize	1	0	0	0	2021	0	0
45	Bosnia	1	0	0	0	2002	0	0
45	Honduras	1	0	0	0	2003	0	0
45	Kenya	1	0	0	0	2002	0	0
46	Belarus	1	0	0	0	0	2012	0
46	Ukraine	1	0	0	0	0	2009	0
47	Cuba	1	0	0	0	0	0	2014
47	Tanzania	1	0	0	0	0	0	2026

==== Miss Universe, Miss World, Miss International, Miss Earth, Miss Supranational, Miss Grand International and Miss Intercontinental ====
The following 76 nations, in order of number of titles won, have managed to win at least once in Miss Universe, Miss World, Miss International, Miss Earth, Miss Supranational, Miss Grand International or Miss Intercontinental:

Titles Won in Miss Universe, Miss World, Miss International, Miss Earth, Miss Supranational, Miss Grand International and Miss Intercontinental
Rank	Entity	Sum	Miss Universe	Miss World	Miss International	Miss Earth	Miss Supra- national	Miss Grand Inter- national	Miss Inter- continental
1	Venezuela	30	1979•1981; 1986•1996; 2008•2009; 2013	1955•1981; 1984•1991; 1995•2011	1985•1997; 2000•2003; 2006•2010; 2015•2018; 2023	2005•2013	0	2019	1974•2001; 2005•2009; 2012
2	United States	22	1954•1956; 1960•1967; 1980•1995; 1997•2012; 2022	1973•1990; 2010	1974•1978; 1982	2020	0	2020	1973•1979; 1982•1994; 2011
3	Philippines	21	1969•1973; 2015•2018	2013	1964•1970; 1979•2005; 2013•2016	2008•2014; 2015•2017	2013•2026	2024•2025	2018•2021
4	Puerto Rico	17	1970•1985; 1993•2001; 2006	1975•2016	1987•2014	2019	2018	2013	1986•1991; 2010•2016; 2024
5	India	15	1994•2000; 2021	1966•1994; 1997•1999; 2000•2017	0	2010	2014•2016	2024	1978•1997
6	Brazil	11	1963•1968	1971	1968	2004•2009	2025	2022	1972•1981; 1998
7	Australia	9	1972•2004	1968•1972	1962•1982; 1992	2024	0	2015	0
8	Germany	9	1961	1956•1980	1965•1989; 2022	0	0	0	1992•1993; 2000
9	Mexico	8	1991•2010; 2020•2025	2018	2007•2009	0	0	0	2017
10	Colombia	8	1958•2014	0	1960•1999; 2004•2025	0	0	0	2004•2008
11	South Africa	7	1978•2017; 2019	1958•1974; 2014	0	0	2022	0	0
12	Thailand	7	1965•1988	2025	2019	0	2019	0	2014•2023
13	Peru	7	1957	1967•2004	0	0	0	2017•2023	1971•1987
14	Russia	7	2002	1992•2008	0	0	0	0	1991•2013; 2015•2025
15	United Kingdom	7	0	1961•1964; 1965•1974; 1983	1969•1972	0	0	0	0
16	Sweden	6	1955•1966; 1984	1951•1952; 1977	0	0	0	0	0
17	Dominican Republic	6	2003	1982 • 2026	0	0	0	2015	1985•1989
18	Poland	6	0	1989•2021	1991•1993; 2001	0	2011	0	0
19	Argentina	5	1962	1960•1978	1967	0	0	0	1980
19	Netherlands	5	1989	1959•1962	1961	0	0	0	1983
20	Spain	5	1974	2015	1977•1990; 2008	0	0	0	0
21	Jamaica	5	0	1963•1976; 1993•2019	0	0	0	0	1990
22	France	4	1953•2016	1953	1976	0	0	0	0
22	Finland	4	1952•1975	1957	1973	0	0	0	0
23	Lebanon	4	1971	0	2002	0	0	0	2003•2007
24	Iceland	4	0	1985•1988; 2005	1963	0	0	0	0
25	Czech Republic	4	0	2006•2023	0	2012•2025	0	0	0
26	Ecuador	4	0	0	2011	2011•2016	2023	0	0
27	Vietnam	4	0	0	2024	2018	0	2021	2022
28	Trinidad and Tobago	3	1977•1998	1986	0	0	0	0	0
29	Japan	3	1959•2007	0	2012	0	0	0	0
30	Canada	3	1982•2005	0	0	2007	0	0	0
31	Greece	3	1964	1996	1994	0	0	0	0
32	Norway	3	1990	0	1988•1995	0	0	0	0
33	Panama	3	2002	0	1998	0	2010	0	0
34	Indonesia	3	0	0	2017	0	2024	2016	0
35	Israel	2	1976	1998	0	0	0	0	0
36	New Zealand	2	1983	0	1971	0	0	0	0
37	Chile	2	1987	0	0	2006	0	0	0
37	Denmark	2	2024	0	0	2001	0	0	0
38	Namibia	2	1992	0	0	0	2021	0	0
39	Nicaragua	2	2023	0	0	0	0	0	1976
40	Austria	2	0	1969•1987	0	0	0	0	0
40	China	2	0	2007•2012	0	0	0	0	0
41	Nigeria	2	0	2001	0	0	0	0	1989
41	Turkey	2	0	2002	0	0	0	0	1999
42	Costa Rica	2	0	0	1980•1983	0	0	0	0
43	England	2	0	0	1986	0	0	0	1977
44	South Korea	2	0	0	0	2022	2017	0	0
45	Paraguay	2	0	0	0	0	2015	2018	0
46	Curaçao	2	0	0	0	0	0	0	1988•2002
47	Angola	1	2011	0	0	0	0	0	0
47	Botswana	1	1999	0	0	0	0	0	0
48	Bermuda	1	0	1979	0	0	0	0	0
48	Egypt	1	0	1954	0	0	0	0	0
48	Gibraltar	1	0	2009	0	0	0	0	0
48	Grenada	1	0	1970	0	0	0	0	0
48	Guam	1	0	1980	0	0	0	0	0
48	Ireland	1	0	2003	0	0	0	0	0
49	Guatemala	1	0	0	1984	0	0	0	0
49	Portugal	1	0	0	1996	0	0	0	0
49	Yugoslavia	1	0	0	1975	0	0	0	0
50	Albania	1	0	0	0	2023	0	0	0
50	Belize	1	0	0	0	2021	0	0	0
50	Bosnia	1	0	0	0	2002	0	0	0
50	Honduras	1	0	0	0	2003	0	0	0
50	Kenya	1	0	0	0	2002	0	0	0
51	Belarus	1	0	0	0	0	2012	0
51	Ukraine	1	0	0	0	0	2009	0	0
52	Cuba	1	0	0	0	0	0	2014	0
52	Tanzania	1	0	0	0	0	0	2026	0
53	Hungary	1	0	0	0	0	0	0	2019
53	Iran	1	0	0	0	0	0	0	1975
53	Slovak Republic	1	0	0	0	0	0	0	2006
53	Tahiti	1	0	0	0	0	0	0	1996
53	United States Virgin Islands	1	0	0	0	0	0	0	1995

== Titles and placements ==
=== Winner titles in major pageants ===
Hundreds of beauty competitions are held every year, but the oldest major pageants of Miss Universe, Miss World, Miss International and Miss Earth, often collectively known as the Big Four, are historically considered the most widely covered and broadcast by the international media.

Puerto Rico has won Miss Universe five times: 1970 with Marisol Malaret, 1985 with Deborah Carthy-Deu, 1993 with Dayanara Torres, 2001 with Denise Quiñones and 2006 with Zuleyka Rivera; Miss World twice: 1975 with Wilnelia, Lady Forsyth-Johnson and 2016 with Stephanie Del Valle; Miss International twice: 1987 with Laurie Simpson and 2014 with Valerie Hernández; and Miss Earth once: 2019 with Nellys Pimentel.

In 1987, Puerto Rico became the ninth nation globally to win Miss World, Miss Universe and Miss International. With 9 titles, Puerto Rico is the fourth nation globally with the most combined titles in these pageants. In 2019, Puerto Rico became the fourth nation to win Miss Universe, Miss World, Miss International and Miss Earth. With 10 titles, Puerto Rico is the fourth nation globally with the most combined titles in these pageants.

The six major pageants of Miss Universe, Miss World, Miss International, Miss Earth, Miss Supranational and Miss Grand International are often collectively known as the Grand Slam Puerto Rico has won both Miss Supranational and Miss Grand International once, winning the former in 2018 with Valeria Vázquez Latorre, and the latter in 2013 with Janelee Chaparro Colón in the first edition of the pageant. In 2019, Puerto Rico became the first nation in the world to win all six pageants. With 12 titles, Puerto Rico is the fifth nation globally with the most combined titles won in these pageants.

Miss Intercontinental is the oldest other international beauty pageant. Puerto Rico has won Miss Intercontinental five times: 1986 with Elizabeth Robinson, 1991 with Carmen Lynda Díaz, 2010 with Maydelise Columna, 2016 with Heylimar Rosario and 2024 with María Cepero. In 2019, Puerto Rico became the first nation in the world to win all seven pageants aforementioned. With 17 titles, Puerto Rico is the fourth nation globally with the most combined titles won in these pageants.

Puerto Rico has won the following important international titles:

Winner Titles of Puerto Rico in Major Pageants
Pageant	Sum	Year
Miss Universe	5	1970 • 1985 • 1993 • 2001 • 2006
Miss World	2	1975 • 2016
Miss International	2	1987 • 2014
Total	9
Miss Earth	1	2019
Total	10
Miss Supranational	1	2018
Miss Grand International	1	2013
Total	12
Miss Intercontinental	5	1986 • 1991 • 2010 • 2016 • 2024
Total	17

=== Placements in major pageants ===
In 2006, Puerto Rico placed for the first time in the oldest major pageants—Miss Universe, Miss World and Miss International—during the same year. In 2010, Puerto Rico placed for the first time in all of the Big Four pageants—Miss Universe, Miss World, Miss International and Miss Earth—during the same year. In 2019, Puerto Rico placed for the first time in all of the Grand Slam pageants—Miss Universe, Miss World, Miss International, Miss Earth, Miss Supranational and Miss Grand International—during the same year. In 2023, Puerto Rico placed for the first time in all of the Grand Slam pageant and Miss Intercontinental, the oldest minor pageant, during the same year.

Puerto Rico has produced the following placements in the most important international pageants:

Placements of Puerto Rico in Major Pageants
Pageant	Sum	Year
Miss Universe	28	List: 1970 • 1971 • 1974 • 1980 • 1985 • 1986 • 1987 • 1993 • 1995 • 1997 • 1998 • 1999 • 2001 • 2004 • 2005 • 2006 • 2009 • 2010 • 2011 • 2013 • 2018 • 2019 • 2020 • 2021 • 2022 • 2023 • 2024 • 2025
Miss World	20	List: 1975 • 1976 • 1978 • 1980 • 1985 • 2002 • 2003 • 2005 • 2006 • 2007 • 2008 • 2010 • 2011 • 2012 • 2016 • 2019 • 2021 • 2023 • 2025 • 2026
Miss International	15	List: 1973 • 1976 • 1986 • 1987 • 1992 • 1997 • 2006 • 2007 • 2008 • 2010 • 2012 • 2013 • 2014 • 2019 • 2023
Total	63
Miss Earth	7	List: 2005 • 2010 • 2019 • 2020 • 2022 • 2023 • 2024
Total	70
Miss Supranational	11	List: 2011 • 2012 • 2013 • 2014 • 2017 • 2018 • 2019 • 2021 • 2023 • 2024 • 2025
Miss Grand International	12	List: 2013 • 2014 • 2015 • 2016 • 2017 • 2018 • 2019 • 2020 • 2021 • 2022 • 2023 • 2026
Total	93
Miss Intercontinental	24	List: 1978 • 1979 • 1982 • 1982 • 1986 • 1990 • 1991 • 1997 • 1999 • 2000 • 2002 • 2005 • 2006 • 2009 • 2010 • 2011 • 2012 • 2009 • 2013 • 2014 • 2015 • 2016 • 2022 • 2023 • 2024
Total	117

Puerto Rico has produced the following placement positions in the most important international pageants:

Winner, Finalist, Semifinalist and Quarterfinalist Placements of Puerto Rico in Major Pageants
Pageant	Sum	Winner (1st place)	1st Runner-Up (2nd place)	2nd Runner-Up (3rd place)	3rd Runner-Up (4th place)	4th Runner-Up (5th place)	5th Runner-Up (6th place)	Finalist (Top 4/8)	Semifinalist (Top 9/25)	Quarterfinalist Top (30/40)
Miss; Universe	28	List: 1970 • 1985 • 1993 • 2001 • 2006	List: 2005 • 2019	List: 1998 • 2004	List: 1971	List: 1987 • 2009	x	List: 1995 • 2018 • 2022 • 2023	List: 1974 • 1980 • 1986 • 1997 • 1999 • 2010 • 2011 • 2013 • 2020 • 2021 • 2024 • 2025	List: 0
Miss; World	20	List: 1975 • 2016	List: 0	List: 2005 • 2011	List: 0	x	x	List: 0	List: 1976 • 1978 • 1980 • 1985 • 2002 • 2003 • 2006 • 2007 • 2008 • 2010 • 2025	List: 2012 • 2019 • 2021 • 2023 • 2026
Miss International	15	List: 1987 • 2014	List: 0	List: 0	List: 2011	List: 0	x	List: 0	List: 1963 • 1976 • 1986 • 1992 • 1997 • 2006 • 2007 • 2008 • 2010 • 2013 • 2019 • 2023	List: 0
Total	63	9	2	4	2	2	x	4	36	4
Miss; Earth	7	List: 2019	List: 0	List: 0	List: 2010	x	x	List: 2005 • 2020 • 2022 • 2024	List: 2023	List: 0
Total	70	10	2	4	3	x	x	8	37	4
Miss Supranational	11	List: 2018	List: 2021	List: 2011	List: 0	List: 2017 • 2025	x	x	List: 2012 • 2013 • 2014 • 2019 • 2023 • 2024	List: 0
Miss Grand International	12	List: 2013	List: 0	List: 0	List: 2016 • 2017 • 2018 • 2021	List: 0	List: 2022 • 2026	x	List: 2014 • 2015 • 2019 • 2020 • 2023	List: 0
Total	93	12	3	5	7	4	2	8	48	4
Miss Intercontinental	24	List: 1986 • 1991 • 2010 • 2016 • 2024	List: 1988 • 1999 • 2006 • 2012 • 2013 • 2022	List: 1978 • 2009	List: 1990	List: 0	List: 0	List: 2005	List: 1979 • 1982 • 1997 • 2000 • 2002 • 2011 • 2014 • 2015 • 2023	List: 0
Total	117	17	9	7	8	4	2	9	57	4

x Placement position no longer awarded and/or does not exist

=== Unplacements in major pageants ===
Puerto Rico has produced the following unplacements in the most important international pageants:

Unplacements of Puerto Rico in Major Pageants
Pageant	Sum	Year
Miss Universe	43	List: 1952 • 1953 • 1954 • 1955 • 1956 • 1957 • 1961 • 1962 • 1963 • 1964 • 1965 • 1966 • 1967 • 1968 • 1969 • 1972 • 1973 • 1975 • 1976 • 1977 • 1978 • 1979 • 1981 • 1982 • 1983 • 1984 • 1988 • 1989 • 1990 • 1991 • 1992 • 1994 • 1996 • 2000 • 2002 • 2003 • 2007 • 2008 • 2012 • 2014 • 2015 • 2016 • 2017
Miss World	31	List: 1959 • 1970 • 1971 • 1972 • 1973 • 1974 • 1977 • 1979 • 1981 • 1982 • 1983 • 1984 • 1989 • 1990 • 1991 • 1992 • 1993 • 1994 • 1995 • 1996 • 1997 • 1998 • 1999 • 2000 • 2001 • 2004 • 2009 • 2013 • 2014 • 2015 • 2018
Miss International	33	List: 1960 • 1961 • 1962 • 1964 • 1965 • 1967 • 1968 • 1971 • 1972 • 1975 • 1977 • 1988 • 1989 • 1990 • 1991 • 1993 • 1994 • 1995 • 1996 • 2000 • 2001 • 2002 • 2003 • 2004 • 2005 • 2009 • 2012 • 2015 • 2016 • 2018 • 2022 • 2024 • 2025
Total	107
Miss Earth	12	List: 2001 • 2002 • 2003 • 2004 • 2006 • 2009 • 2011 • 2012 • 2014 • 2017 • 2018 • 2021
Total	119
Miss Supranational	4	List: 2010 • 2015 • 2016 • 2022
Miss Grand International	2	List: 2024 • 2025
Total	125
Miss Intercontinental	16	List: 1973 • 1974 • 1975 • 1976 • 1977 • 1981 • 1983 • 1989 • 1992 • 1996 • 2001 • 2004 • 2017 • 2018 • 2019 • 2025
Total	141

=== Absences in major pageants ===
Puerto Rico has produced the following absences in the most important international pageants:

Absences of Puerto Rico in Major Pageants
Pageant	Sum	Year
Miss Universe	3	List: 1958 • 1959 • 1960
Miss World	22	List: 1951 • 1952 • 1953 • 1954 • 1955 • 1956 • 1957 • 1958 • 1960 • 1961 • 1962 • 1963 • 1964 • 1965 • 1966 • 1967 • 1968 • 1969 • 1986 • 1987 • 1988 • 2017
Miss International	15	List: 1969 • 1970 • 1973 • 1974 • 1978 • 1979 • 1980 • 1981 • 1982 • 1983 • 1984 • 1985 • 1998 • 1999 • 2017
Total	40
Miss Earth	6	List: 2007 • 2008 • 2013 • 2015 • 2016 • 2025
Total	46
Miss Supranational	1	List: 2009
Miss Grand International	0
Total	47
Miss Intercontinental	13	List: 1971 • 1972 • 1980 • 1985 • 1987 • 1993 • 1994 • 1995 • 1998 • 2003 • 2007 • 2008 • 2021
Total	60

=== Placement and title record in major pageants ===
Puerto Rico has produced the following winners, placements, unplacements and absences in the most important international pageants:

Placement and Title Record of Puerto Rico in Major Pageants
Pageant	Edition	Winner	Placed	Unplaced	Absent
Miss Universe	74	5	28	43	3
Miss World	73	2	20	31	22
Miss International	63	2	15	33	15
Total	210	9	63	107	40
Miss Earth	25	1	7	12	6
Total	235	10	70	119	46
Miss Supranational	17	1	11	4	1
Miss Grand International	14	1	12	2	0
Total	266	12	93	120	47
Miss Intercontinental	53	5	24	16	13
Total	319	17 (Note: Winners are not to be counted separately, as they are included in the Placed category.)	117	141	60

== Miss Universe ==
Miss Universe Puerto Rico
- Formation: 1952
- Type: Beauty pageant
- Location: Puerto Rico
- Members: Miss Universe
- Official language: Spanish, English
- National Director: Yicette Cifredo

=== History ===
In its various forms, the Miss Puerto Rico beauty pageant has been held almost every year since the 1930s. The winner of the contest represents Puerto Rico at the Miss Universe pageant each year.

The selection of Miss Universe Puerto Rico commences the year before the winner advances to participate in the Miss Universe pageant. Each Puerto Rican municipality may choose a representative who then enters the Miss Puerto Rico finals, traditionally held at a San Juan area hotel. The winner is crowned at the conclusion of the final competition.

There have been several changes to the pageant's ownership and name. Miss Puerto Rico was held from 1952 until 1995 under the direction of Anna Santisteban. From 1996 to 1998, Telemundo organized the contest under the name Miss Universe Puerto Rico. From 1999 to 2002, TeleOnce obtained the franchise, renaming it Miss Puerto Rico Universe. Magali Febles organized the pageant between 2003 and 2009 and the pageant title remained the same. In 2010, Luisito Vigoreaux and Desireé Lowry obtained the franchise and renamed the pageant Miss Universe Puerto Rico. In 2018, WAPA-TV obtained ownership of the franchise, keeping the name of Miss Universe Puerto Rico and hiring Denise Quiñones as the pageant's director. In 2022, host, motivational speaker, Miss Puerto Rico Petite 2000 (national title), and Miss Global Petite 2000 (international title), Yizette Cifredo Hernández, became the new national director of the pageant.

==== Host ====
The Miss Universe franchise in Puerto Rico has hosted or is scheduled to host the following editions of the international competition:

Year	Pageant	Edition	Location	Venue
1972	Miss Universe	21st	Dorado, Puerto Rico	Cerromar Beach Hotel
2001	Miss Universe	50th	Bayamón, Puerto Rico	Coliseo Rubén Rodríguez
2002	Miss Universe	51st	San Juan, Puerto Rico	Roberto Clemente Coliseum
2026	Miss Universe	75th	San Juan, Puerto Rico	José Miguel Agrelot Coliseum

In 1972, Puerto Rico became the first area outside the contiguous United States to host Miss Universe, making it the first country or territory in Latin America, Europe, Africa, Asia, and Oceania to host the pageant. In 2001, Puerto Rico became the first participating country or territory—and only one as of 2025—to win the international title of Miss Universe as a host, not including the United States.

=== Placements ===
==== Miss Universe world ranking by number of finalists, semifinalists and quarterfinalists ====
As of 2025, the following nations and territories, in order of number of finalists, semifinalists and quarterfinalists, have placed more times in the final night of the competition:

Placements of Finalists, Semifinalists and Quarterfinalists in Miss Universe
Ranking	Entity	Sum	Winner	1st Finalist	2nd Finalist	3rd Finalist	4th Finalist	Top 5/6	Top 9/10/12	Top 13/15/16/20/21/30
1	United States	68	1954•1956; 1960•1967; 1980•1995; 1997•2012; 2022	1953•1970; 1973•1978; 1983•1986; 1990•2004; 2014	1959•1965; 1975•1987; 1989•2001; 2015	1958	1961•1968; 1982•2006; 2007	1991•1993; 1994•1996; 1998•2000	List: 1952•1971 1972•1974 1977•1979 1981•1984 1985•1988 1992•2005 2008•2013 2016•2017 2019•2021	List: 1955•1962 1963•1964 1966•1979 2003•2009 2011•2018 2023• 2025
2	Venezuela	49	1979•1981; 1986•1996; 2008•2009; 2013	1967•1976; 1997•1998; 2000•2003; 2022	1972•1984; 1993•1994; 2007•2012; 2018•2025	1968•1985; 1987•2001	2002•2005; 2024	1991•1992; 1995•1999; 2017	List: 1977•1983 1988•1989 1990•2014 2015•2023	List: 1955•1956 1964•1970 2011•2019 2021
3	Colombia	40	1958•2014	1992•1993; 1994•2008; 2015•2017	1986•1990; 2016	1974•1977; 1978	1984	1998•2019; 2021•2023	List: 1973•1975 1976•1980 1988•1995 2000•2004 2006• 2025	List: 1959•1960 1962•1963 1965•1966 1969•2010 2011•2020 2022
4	Brazil	40	1963•1968	1954•1957; 1958•1972; 2007•2020	2011	1979•1981	1959•1962; 1971•2012; 2013	0	List: 1982•1985 1986•1993 1998•2003 2016•2017	List: 1955•1956 1960•1964 1965•1967 1969•1970 1973•1975 2006•2014 2015•2018 2019•2025
5	Sweden	29	1955•1966; 1984	1989	1956•1981	1965•1975	1954•1964; 1978•1979; 1980	0	List: 1952•1987 1992•1994 1996•1997	List: 1957•1958 1959•1961 1967•1968 1969•1970 2006•2009
6	Philippines	29	1969•1973; 2015•2018	1999•2012	0	1963•1980; 1984•2011; 2013	1975•2010	1994•2016; 2021	List: 1954•1972 1974•1987 2014•2017 2023	List: 1965•1966 2019•2020 2024
7	India	29	1994•2000; 2021	1995	1992	1966•2020	2001	1993	List: 1972•1973 1974•1990 1996•1997 1998•1999 2002•2004 2007•2013	List: 2006•2012 2014•2019 2022•2023 2024•2025
8	Puerto Rico	28	1970•1985; 1993•2001; 2006	2005•2019	1998•2004	1971	1987•2009	1995•2018; 2022•2023	1974•1980; 1986•1997; 1999•2010; 2020•2021; 2024•2025	2011•2013
9	South Africa	27	1978•2017; 2019	1984•2018	2003•2021	1960•2002	0	1999	List: 1952•1979 1982•1995 1998•2000 2009•2010 2012	List: 1953•1963 1965•2005 2008•2015 2022•2023
10	France	24	1953•2016	0	0	0	0	2015	List: 1964•1971 1991•2000 2001•2009 2011•2012 2019•2021	List: 1954•1956 1959•1961 1963•1968 2010•2014 2020•2024 2025
11	Peru	23	1957	0	2020	0	0	0	List: 1972•1978 1982•1987 1996•2005 2016•2019 2023•2024	List: 1953•1954 1956•1958 1961•1965 1966•1969 2003•2012 2022
12	Mexico	23	1991•2010; 2020•2025	0	1988•2019; 2024	1953•2005	1989•2008	1990•1996	List: 1952•1978 1999•2006 2007•2012 2016	List: 1956•2004 2005
13	Australia	22	1972•2004	1971	1969•1970; 2010•2023	2009•2012	1953•1976	1993•2015	List: 1974•1992 2008•2011 2014•2020	List: 1965•2018 2022

==== Miss Universe world ranking by number of finalists ====
As of 2025, the following nations and territories, in order of number of finalists, have placed more times in the final group of finalists:

Placements of Finalists in Miss Universe
Ranking	Entity	Sum	Winner	1st Finalist	2nd Finalist	3rd Finalist	4th Finalist	Top 5/6
1	United States	37	1954•1956; 1960•1967; 1980•1995; 1997•2012; 2022	1953•1970; 1973•1978; 1983•1986; 1990•2004; 2014	1959•1965; 1975•1987; 1989•2001; 2015	1958	1961•1968; 1982•2006; 2007	1991•1993; 1994•1996; 1998•2000
2	Venezuela	34	1979•1981; 1986•1996; 2008•2009; 2013	1967•1976; 1997•1998; 2000•2003; 2022	1972•1984; 1993•1994; 2007•2012; 2018•2025	1968•1985; 1987•2001	2002•2005; 2024	1991•1992; 1995•1999; 2017
3	Colombia	19	1958•2014	1992•1993; 1994•2008; 2015•2017	1986•1990; 2016	1974•1977; 1978	1984	1998•2019; 2021•2023
5	Philippines	17	1969•1973; 2015•2018	1999•2012	0	1963•1980; 1984•2011; 2013•2025	1975•2010	1994•2016; 2021
6	Puerto Rico	16	1970•1985; 1993•2001; 2006	2005•2019	1998•2004	1971	1987•2009	1995•2018; 2022•2023
7	Brazil	16	1963•1968	1954•1957; 1958•1972; 2007•2020	2011	1979•1981	1959•1962; 1971•2012; 2013	0
8	Mexico	13	1991•2010; 2020•2025	0	1988•2019; 2024	1953•2005	1989•2008	1990•1996
9	Sweden	13	1955•1966; 1984	1989	1956•1981	1965•1975	1954•1964; 1978•1979; 1980	0
10	Australia	13	1972•2004	1971	1969•1970; 2010•2023	2009•2012	1953•1976	1993•2015
11	Finland	12	1952•1975	1965•1966; 1969	1962•1968; 1971•1974; 1996	1967	1986	0
12	South Africa	10	1978•2017; 2019	1984•2018	2003•2021	1960•2002	0	1999
13	India	9	1994•2000; 2021	1995	1992	1966•2020	2001	1993
14	Japan	9	1959•2007	2006	1953	1970•1988	1955•1969; 2003	0

==== Miss Universe world ranking by number of titles ====
As of 2025, the following nations and territories, in order of number of titles, have won the largest number of titles:

Titles Won in Miss Universe
Ranking	Entity	Sum	Miss Universe Titles
1	United States	9	1954•1956; 1960•1967; 1980•1995; 1997•2012; 2022
2	Venezuela	7	1979•1981; 1986•1996; 2008•2009; 2013
3	Puerto Rico	5	1970•1985; 1993•2001; 2006
4	Mexico	4	1991•2010; 2020•2025
4	Philippines	4	1969•1973; 2015•2018
5	India	3	1994•2000; 2021
5	South Africa	3	1978•2017; 2019
5	Sweden	3	1955•1966; 1984

==== Puerto Rico placements ====
As of 2025, Puerto Rico has produced the following placements in Miss Universe:

Placement	Quantity	Year
Winner	5	1970 • 1985 • 1993 • 2001 • 2006
1st Runner-Up	2	2005 • 2019
2nd Runner-Up	2	1998 • 2004
3rd Runner-Up	1	1971
4th Runner-Up	2	1987 • 2009
Top 5 or Top 6	4	1995 • 2018 • 2022 • 2023
Top 10 or Top 12	10	1974 • 1980 • 1986 • 1997 • 1999 • 2010 • 2020 • 2021 • 2024 • 2025
Top 16 or Top 20	2	2011 • 2013
Total	28

==== Puerto Rico placement streaks ====
As of 2025, Puerto Rico has produced the following placement streaks lasting at least three years:

Duration	Total	Placements
2018–ongoing	8	2018, 2019, 2020, 2021, 2022, 2023, 2024, 2025
2009–2011	3	2009, 2010, 2011
2003–2006	3	2004, 2005, 2006
1997–1999	3	1997, 1998, 1999
1985–1987	3	1985, 1986, 1987

As of 2025, Puerto Rico has placed consecutively in the last eight editions of the international competition, becoming the longest uninterrupted streak in the history of Puerto Rico, and the longest uninterrupted streak in the international competition currently. In Miss Universe 2024, United States broke its streak of 13 years, ending the longest ongoing streak in Miss Universe.

=== Representatives ===
Color Key

- Winner of Miss Universe
- Finalist in the Top 3, 5, or 6
- Semifinalist in the Top 9, 10, or 12
- Quarterfinalist in the Top 13, 15, 16, 20, 21, or 30

Year	Representative	Town	Placement	Award
2026	Jennifer Barreto (née Abreu Mora)	San Sebastián	TBA
2025	Zashely Nicole Alicea Rivera	Dorado	Top 12
2024	Jennifer Colón Alvarado	Orocovis	Top 12
2023	Karla Inelisse Guilfú Acevedo	Patillas	Top 5	Voice For Change
2022	Ashley Ann Cariño Barreto	Fajardo	Top 5
2021	Michelle Marie Colón Ramírez	Loíza	Top 10
2020	Estefanía Natalia Soto Torres	San Sebastián	Top 10
2019	Madison Sara Anderson Berrios	Toa Baja	1st Runner-Up
2018	Kiara Liz Ortega Delgado	Rincón	Top 5
2017	Danyeshka "Danna" Hernández Valentín	San Juan	Unplaced
2016	Brenda Azaria Jiménez Hernández	Aguadilla	Unplaced
2016	Kristhielee Yinaira Caride Santiago	Isabela	Succeeded by first runner-up after dethronement due to failed press obligations
2015	Catalina Morales Gómez	Guaynabo	Unplaced
2014	Gabriela Berríos Pagán	Toa Baja	Unplaced	Miss Photogenic
2013	Monic Marie Pérez Díaz	Arecibo	Top 16
2012	Bodine Koehler Peña	Río Grande	Unplaced
2011	Viviana Ortiz Pastrana	Corozal	Top 16
2010	Mariana Paola Vicente Morales	Río Grande	Top 10
2009	Mayra Matos Pérez	Cabo Rojo	4th Runner-Up
2008	Ingrid Marie Rivera Santos	Dorado	Unplaced
2007	Wilmadilis "Uma" Blasini Pérez	Guayanilla	Unplaced
2006	Zuleyka Jerrís Rivera Mendoza	Salinas	Miss Universe 2006
2005	Cynthia Enid Olavarría Rivera	Salinas	1st Runner-Up
2004	Alba Giselle Reyes Santos	Cidra	2nd Runner-Up	Miss Photogenic
2003	Carla Tricoli Rodríguez	Vieques	Unplaced	Miss Photogenic
2002	Isis Marie Casalduc González	Utuado	Unplaced	Miss Photogenic
2001	Denise Marie Quiñones August	Lares	Miss Universe 2001	Miss Photogenic
2000	Zoraida Isabel Fonalledas Ferraiouli	Guaynabo	Unplaced
1999	Brenda Liz López Ramos	Lares	Top 10	Miss Photogenic
1998	Joyce Marie Giraud Mojica	Aguas Buenas	2nd Runner-Up
1997	Ana Rosa Brito Suárez	San Juan	Top 10
1996	Sarybel Velilla Cabeza	Toa Alta	Unplaced
1995	Desirée Lowry Rodríguez	Corozal	Top 6
1994	Brenda Esther Robles Cortés	Isabela	Unplaced
1993	Dayanara Torres Delgado	Toa Alta	Miss Universe; 1993
1992	Daisy García Rodríguez	Bayamón	Unplaced
1991	Lizzette Marie Bouret Echevarría	Toa Alta	Unplaced
1990	María Luisa Fortuño Cosimí	Guaynabo	Unplaced
1989	Catalina María Villar Ruiz	Salinas	Unplaced
1988	Isabel María Pardo Cubeñas	Guaynabo	Unplaced
1987	Laurie Tamara Simpson Rivera	San Juan	4th Runner-Up
1986	Elizabeth Robison Latalladi	San Germán	Top 10
1985	Deborah Fátima Carthy Deu	San Juan	Miss Universe 1985
1984	Sandra Beauchamp Roche	Mayagüez	Unplaced
1983	Carmen Batíz Vergara	Trujillo Alto	Unplaced
1982	Lourdes Milagros Mantero Hormazábal	Juncos	Unplaced
1981	Carmen Lotti Rodríguez	Guaynabo	Unplaced
1980	Agnes Tañón Correa	Caguas	Top 12
1979	Audrey Teresa "Tere" López Hernández	Mayagüez	Unplaced
1978	Ada Cecille Perkins Flores	San Juan	Unplaced
1977	María Del Mar Rivera Veglio	Ponce	Unplaced
1976	Elizabeth Zayas Ortíz	Salinas	Unplaced
1975	Lorell Del Carmen Carmona Juan	San Germán	Unplaced
1974	Sonia María Stege Chardón	San Juan	Top 12
1973	Gladys Vanessa Colón Díaz	Orocovis	Unplaced
1972	Bárbara Torres Viñolo	Santurce	Unplaced
1971	Idalia Margarita "Beba" Franco	San Juan	3rd Runner-Up
1970	Marisol Malaret Contreras	Santurce	Miss Universo; 1970
1969	Aída Betancourt	Río Piedras	Unplaced
1968	Marylene Carrasquillo	Santurce	Unplaced
1967	Yvonne Coll Mendoza	Fajardo	Unplaced
1966	Carol Bajandas	Santurce	Unplaced
1965	Gloria Cobián Díaz	Ponce	Unplaced
1964	Yolanda Rodríguez Machín	San Juan	Unplaced
1963	Jeanette Biascoechea	Ponce	Unplaced
1962	Ana Celia Sosa	San Juan	Unplaced
1961	Enid Del Valle	San Juan	Unplaced
1960	No Representative
1959	No Representative
1958	No Representative
1957	María del Pilar "Mapita" Mercado Cortés	Ponce	Unplaced	Miss Congeniality
1956	Francisca "Paquita" Vivó Colón	San Lorenzo	Unplaced
1955	Carmen Laura Betancourt	Trujillo Alto	Unplaced
1954	Lucy Santiago	San Juan	Unplaced
1953	Wanda Irizarry	San Juan	Unplaced
1952	Marilia Levy Bernal	Lares	Unplaced

Source: Reinas de Puerto Rico by the Interamerican University of Puerto Rico.

=== Gallery of Miss Universe ===
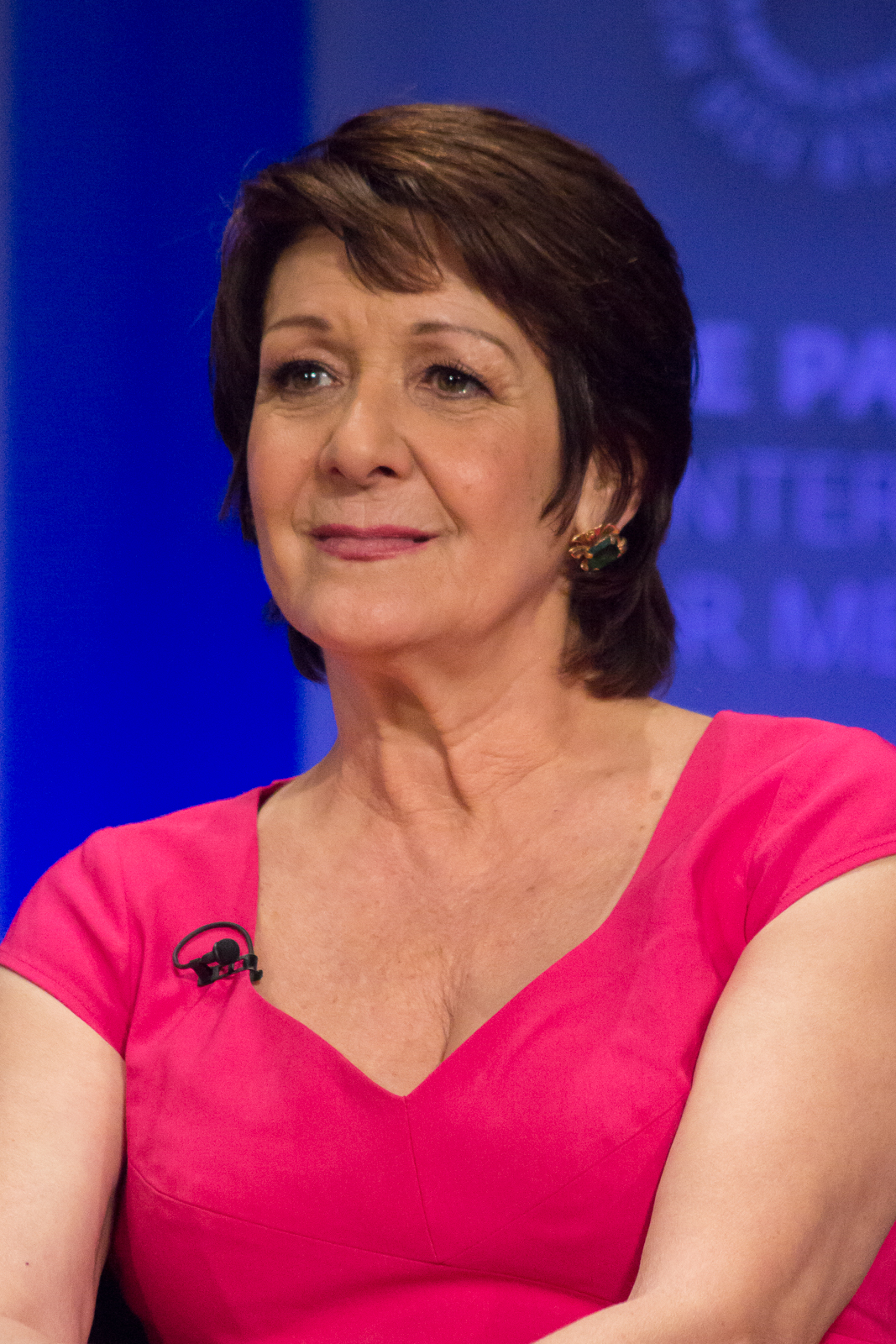
Ivonne Coll, Miss Universe Puerto Rico 1967

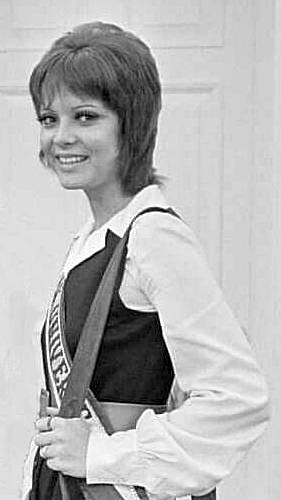
Marisol Malaret, Miss Universe Puerto Rico 1970 and Miss Universe 1970

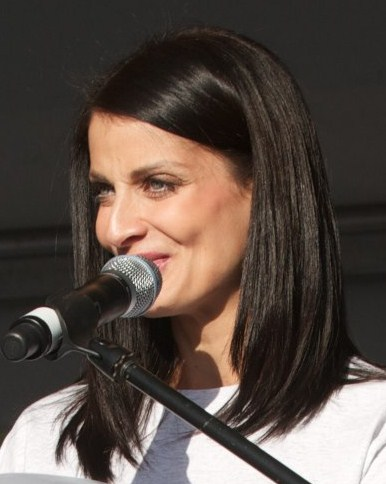
Dayanara Torres, Miss Universe Puerto Rico 1993 and Miss Universe 1993

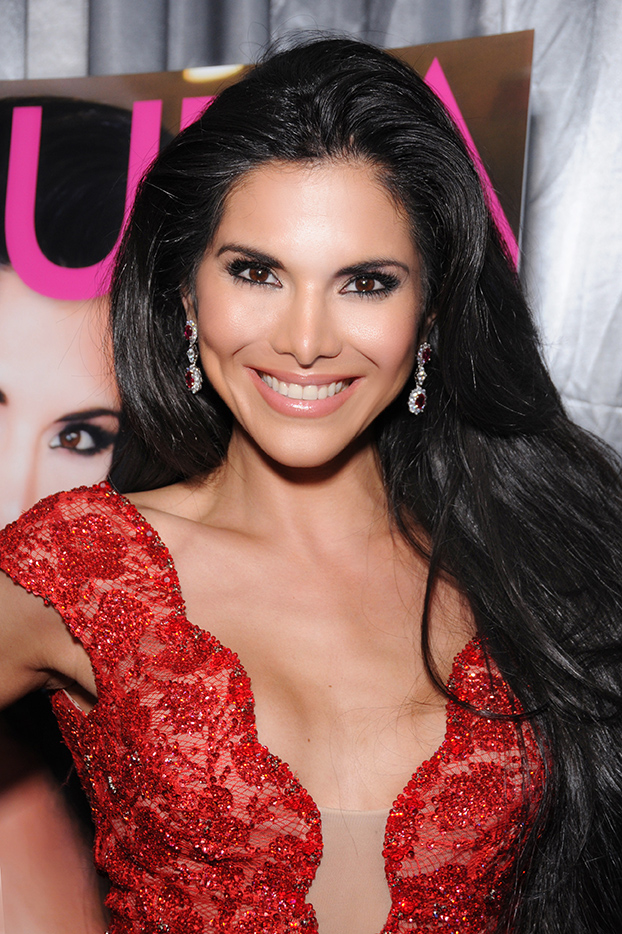
Joyce Giraud, Miss Universe Puerto Rico 1998 and 2nd Runner-Up in Miss Universe 1998

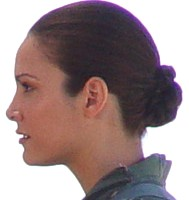
Denise Quiñones, Miss Universe Puerto Rico 2001 and Miss Universe 2001

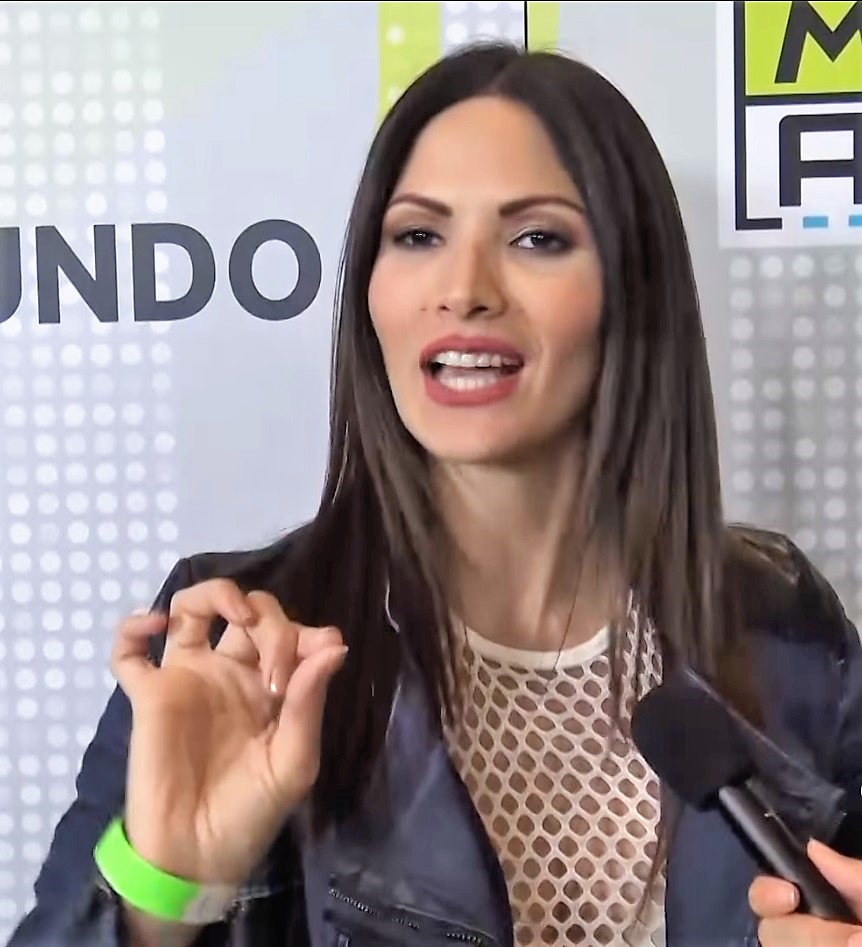
Cynthia Olavarría, Miss Universe Puerto Rico 2005 and 1st Runner-Up in Miss Universe 2005

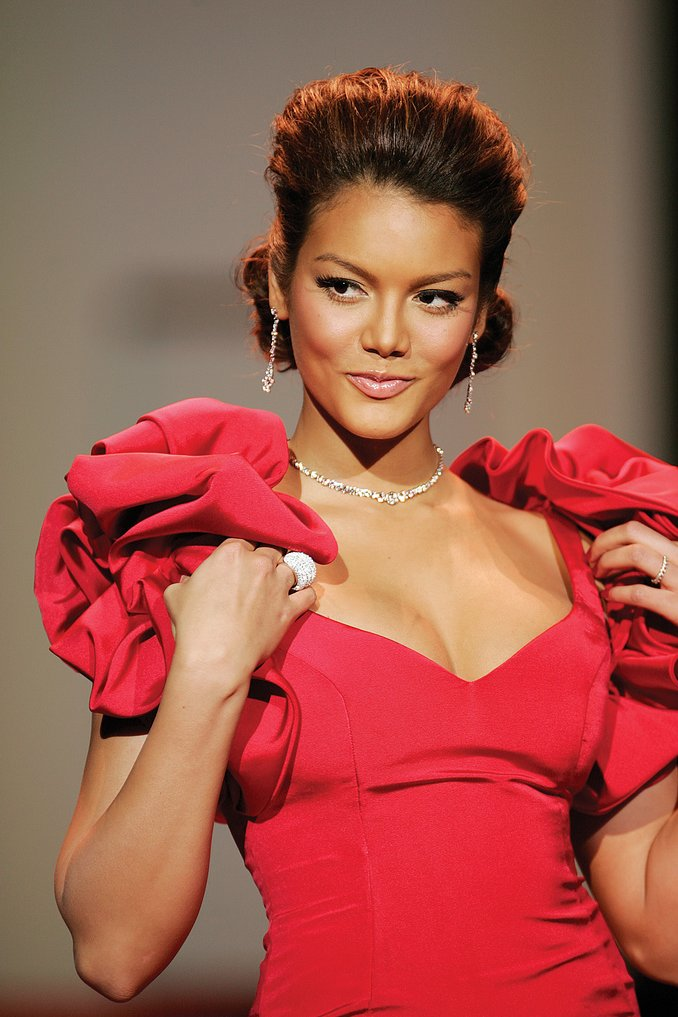
Zuleyka Rivera, Miss Universe Puerto Rico 2006 and Miss Universe 2006

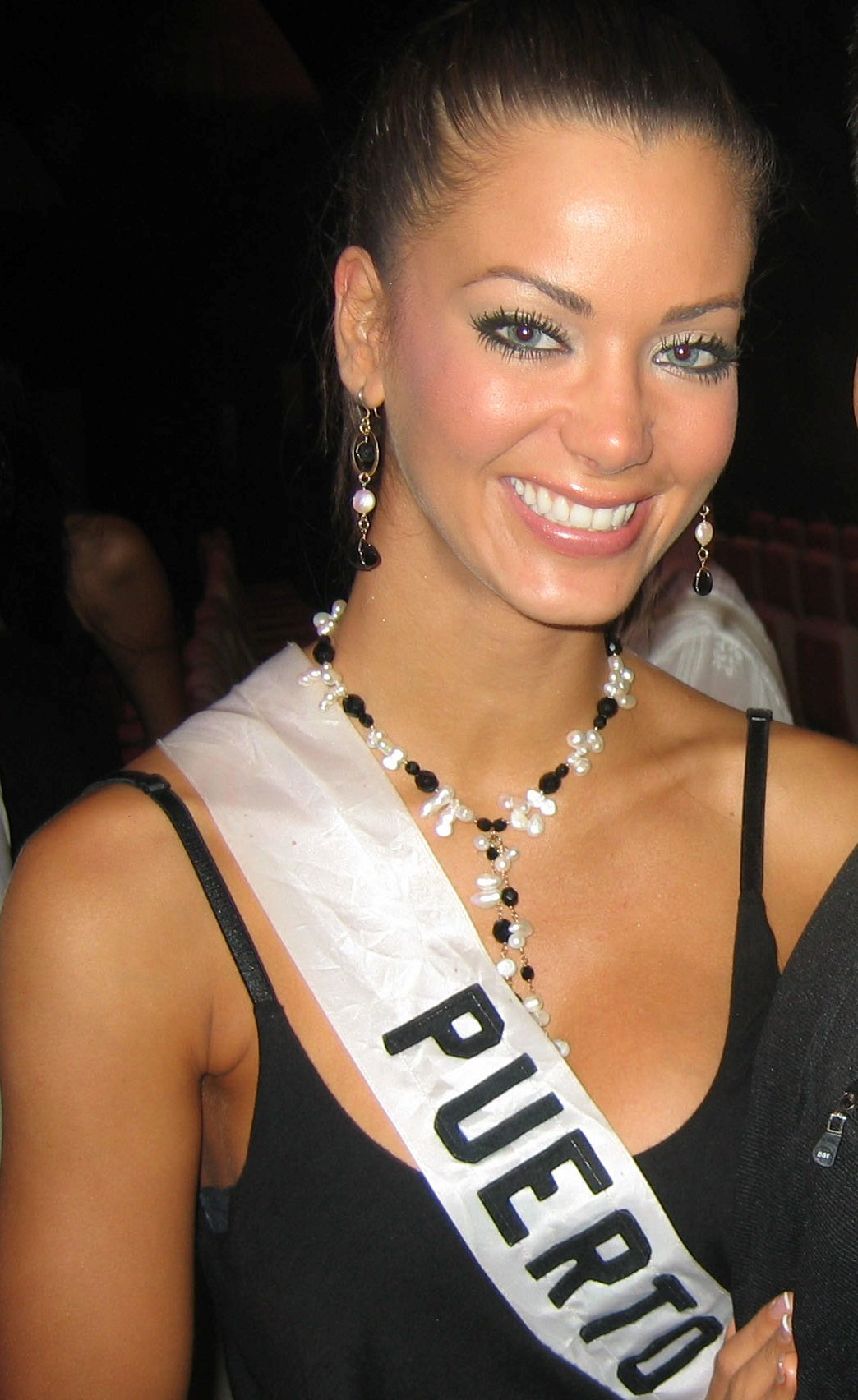
Ingrid Marie Rivera, Miss Universe Puerto Rico 2008

== Miss World ==
Miss World Puerto Rico
- Formation: 1959
- Type: Beauty pageant
- Location: Puerto Rico
- Members: Miss World
- Official language: Spanish, English
- National Director: Wilnelia Merced Forsyth; Ana Esther Avilés

=== History ===
Puerto Rico debuted in Miss World in 1959, then it was absent from 1960 to 1969. In 1970, a new organization took the responsibility of sending contestants until 1985 via castings. Puerto Rico did not compete in Miss World from 1986 to 1988. The Miss Puerto Rico organization, directed by Anna Santisteban, obtained the Miss World franchise in 1989, with Tania Collazo as her first Miss World delegate. Santisteban produced Miss World Puerto Rico until 1995.

In 1996, Delia Cruz, mother of Miss World Wilnelia Merced, Lady Forsyth-Johnson, obtained the franchise and began organizing the Miss Mundo Puerto Rico pageant with Tania Collazo as organizer for a few years before Desiree Lowry, and later on Shanira Blanco. Currently, the pageant is presided by Wilnelia Merced, and directed by Ana Esther Avilés and Barbara Serrano.

==== Host ====
Puerto Rico has held the following Miss World edition:

Year	Pageant	Location	Venue
2021	Miss World 2021	San Juan, Puerto Rico	José Miguel Agrelot Coliseum

In 2021, Puerto Rico became the first nation in Latin America to host Miss World. It marked the third time the pageant was held in the Americas, after having been celebrated in the contiguous United States in 1991 and 2016.

=== Placements ===
Puerto Rico has two winners in Miss World 1975 and Miss World 2016. As of 2025, Puerto Rico has produced the following placements:

Placement	Quantity	Year
Winner	2	1975 • 2016
1st Runner-Up	0
2nd Runner-Up	2	2005 • 2011
Top 4 or Top 8	0
Top 10; Top 15 or Top 25	11	1976 • 1978 • 1980 • 1985 • 2002 • 2003 • 2006 • 2007 • 2008 • 2010 • 2025
Top 30 or Top 40	5	2012 • 2019 • 2021 • 2023 • 2026
Total	20

=== Representatives ===
Color Key

- Winner of Miss World
- Finalist in the Top 3 or Top 8
- Semifinalist in the Top 10, Top 15 or 25
- Quarterfinalist in the Top 30 or Top 40

Year	Representative	Town	Placement	Award
2026	Suil Anyelina Pagán	Dorado	Top 40	List: Sports Challenge
2025	Valeria Nicole Pérez Santiago	Manatí	Top 20	List: Beauty with a Purpose (Americas & Caribbean); Best Designer Dress (Americas & Caribbean); 1st Runner-Up Queen of Caribbean; Top 5 Americas & Caribbean; Top 28 Multimedia; Top 48 Talent
2024	Due to delay in celebration of 2023 edition, no pageant in 2024
2023	Elena Rivera Reyes	Toa Baja	Top 40	List: Top 25 Head-to-Head Challenge; Top 23 Talent
2022	Due to COVID-19 outbreak in Puerto Rico, no pageant in 2022
2021	Aryam Mariel Díaz Rosado	Naranjito	Top 40	List: 2nd Runner-Up Top Model
2020	Due to the COVID-19 pandemic, no pageant in 2020
2019	Daniella Rodríguez Laureano	Bayamón	Top 40	List: Top 40 Top Model
2018	Dayanara Martínez Rosado	Canóvanas	Unplaced	List: 3rd Runner-Up Sanya Tourism Promotional Video; Top 18 Talent
2017	Due to Hurricane María in Puerto Rico, no representative in 2017
2016	Stephanie Marie Del Valle Díaz	San Juan	Miss World 2016	List: Top 21 Talent
2015	Keysi Marie Vargas Vélez	Quebradillas	Unplaced	List: Top 5 Top Model; Top 10 Designer Dress; Top 30 Talent
2014	Génesis Marie Dávila Pérez	Arroyo	Unplaced	List: Top 20 Top Model
2013	Nadyalee Torres López	Caguas	Unplaced
2012	Janelee Marcus Chaparro Colón	Barceloneta	Top 30	List: Top 10 Designer Dress; Top 40 Beach Beauty; Top 47 Top Model
2011	Amanda Victoria Vilanova Pérez	San Juan	2nd Runner-Up	List: Queen of Caribbean; Top 11 Talent; Top 20 Beach Beauty; Top 24 Sports; Top 30 Beauty with a Purpose
2010	Yara Liz Lasanta Santiago	Barranquitas	Top 25	List: Miss Beach Beauty
2009	Jennifer Colón Alvarado	Bayamón	Unplaced	List: Top 12 Beach Beauty; Top 12 Sports; Top 12 Designer Dress
2008	Ivonne Marie Orsini López	San Juan	Top 16	List: Top 10 Beach Beauty; Top 32 Top Model
2007	Jennifer Guevara	Orocovis	Top 16	List: 1st Runner-Up Top Model
2006	Thebyam Carrión Álvarez	Arecibo	Top 17	List: 1st Runner-Up Beauty with a Purpose; 1st Runner-Up Sports; Top 25 Beach Beauty
2005	Ingrid Marie Rivera Santos	Dorado	2nd Runner-Up	List: Queen of Caribbean
2004	Cassandra Castro Holland	Luquillo	Unplaced	List: Top 10 Top Model
2003	Joyceline Montero García	Bayamón	Top 20	List: 1st Runner-Up Talent
2002	Cassandra Polo Berrios	Guaynabo	Top 20
2001	Bárbara Serrano Negrón	Vieques	Unplaced
2000	Sarybel Velilla Cabeza	Toa Alta	Unplaced
1999	Arlene Torres Torres	Bayamón	Unplaced
1998	Antonia Alfonso Pagán	Juana Díaz	Unplaced
1997	Áurea Isis Marrero Nieves	Dorado	Unplaced
1996	Marissa De La Caridad Hernández Cardona	Guaynabo	Unplaced
1995	Swanni Quiñones Laracuente	Guaynabo	Unplaced
1994	Joyce Marie Giraud Mojica	Aguas Buenas	Unplaced
1993	Ana Rosa Brito Suárez	San Juan	Unplaced
1992	Lianabel Rosario Centeno	Trujillo Alto	Unplaced
1991	Johanna Berenice Irizarry Nazario	Lajas	Unplaced
1990	Magdalena Pabón	San Juan	Unplaced
1989	Tania Collazo Barreiro	Orocovis	Unplaced
1988	No Representative
1987	No Representative
1986	No Representative
1985	Iris Matías González	San Juan	Top 15
1984	María de los Ángeles Rosa Silva	San Juan	Unplaced
1983	Fátima Mustafá Vázquez	Aibonito	Unplaced
1982	Jannette Torres Burgos	Morovis	Unplaced
1981	Andrenira Ruiz Sáez	San Juan	Unplaced
1980	Michele Torres Cintrón	Ponce	Top 15
1979	Daisy Marissette López	San Juan	Unplaced
1978	María "Marichu" Jesús Cañizares	Río Piedras	Top 15
1977	Didriana Del Río	San Juan	Unplaced
1976	Ivette Rosado	Bayamón	Top 15
1975	Wilnelia Merced Cruz	Caguas	Miss World 1975
1974	Loyda Eunice Valle Blas Machado	Camuy	Unplaced
1973	Milagros García		Unplaced
1972	Ana Nisi Goyco Graciani	Ponce	Unplaced
1971	Raquel Quintana		Unplaced
1970	Alma Doris Pérez Vélez		Unplaced
1969	No Representative
1968	No Representative
1967	No Representative
1966	No Representative
1965	No Representative
1964	No Representative
1963	No Representative
1962	No Representative
1961	No Representative
1960	No Representative
1959	Lyllianna "Lilie" Díaz Noya	San Juan	Unplaced
1958	No Representative
1957	No Representative
1956	No Representative
1955	No Representative
1954	No Representative
1953	No Representative
1952	No Representative
1951	No Representative

Source: Reinas de Puerto Rico by the Interamerican University of Puerto Rico.

=== Gallery of Miss World ===
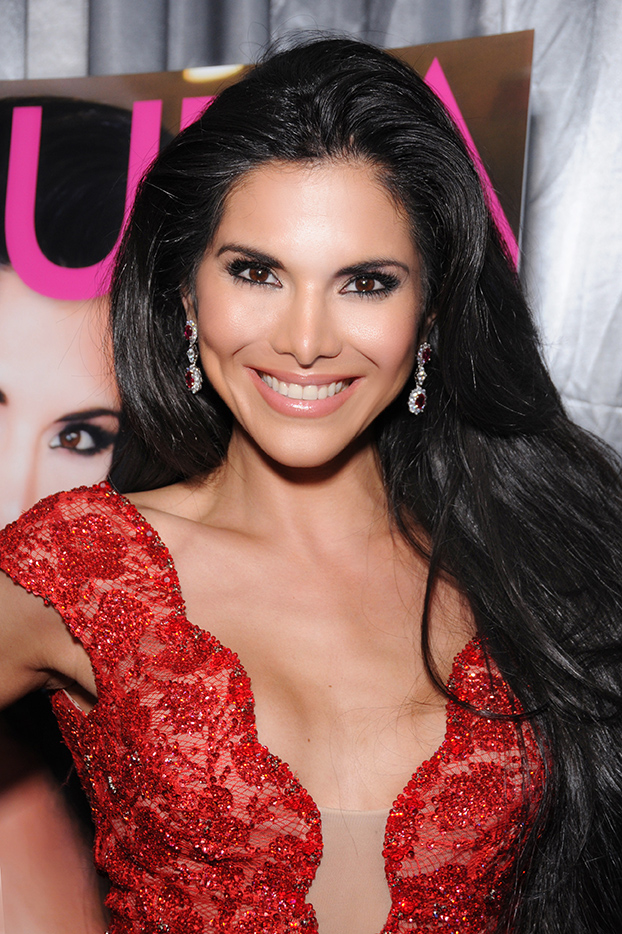
Joyce Giraud, Miss World Puerto Rico 1994

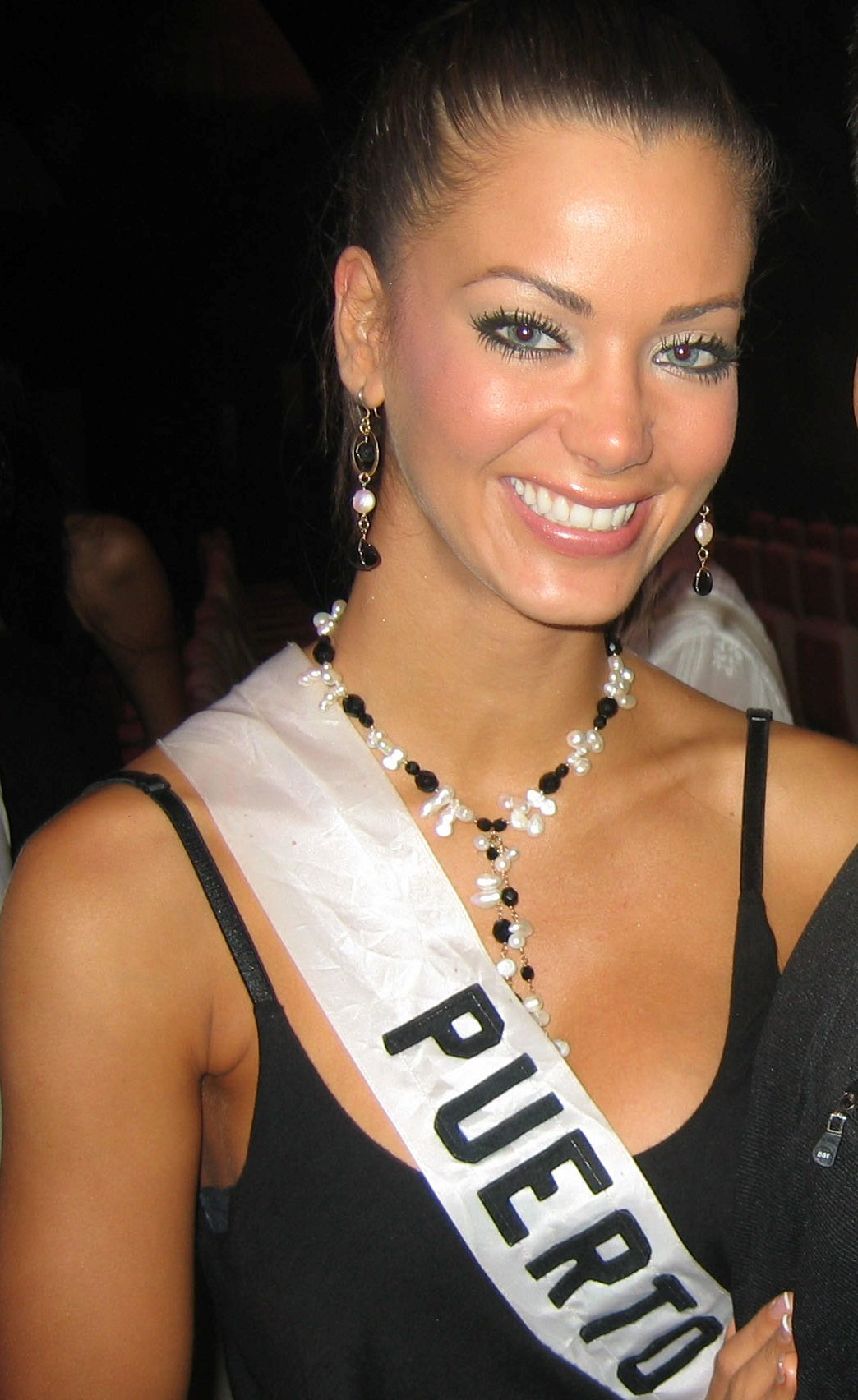
Ingrid Rivera, Miss World Puerto Rico 2005 and 2nd Runner-Up in Miss World 2005

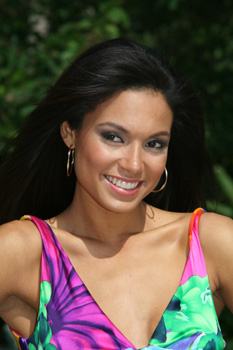
Jennifer Guevara, Miss World Puerto Rico 2007 and Top 16 in Miss World 2007

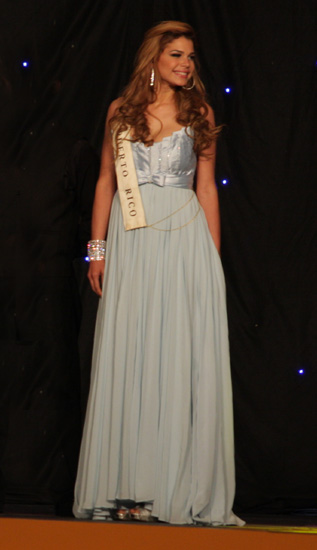
Ivonne Orsini, Miss World Puerto Rico 2008 and Top 16 in Miss World 2008

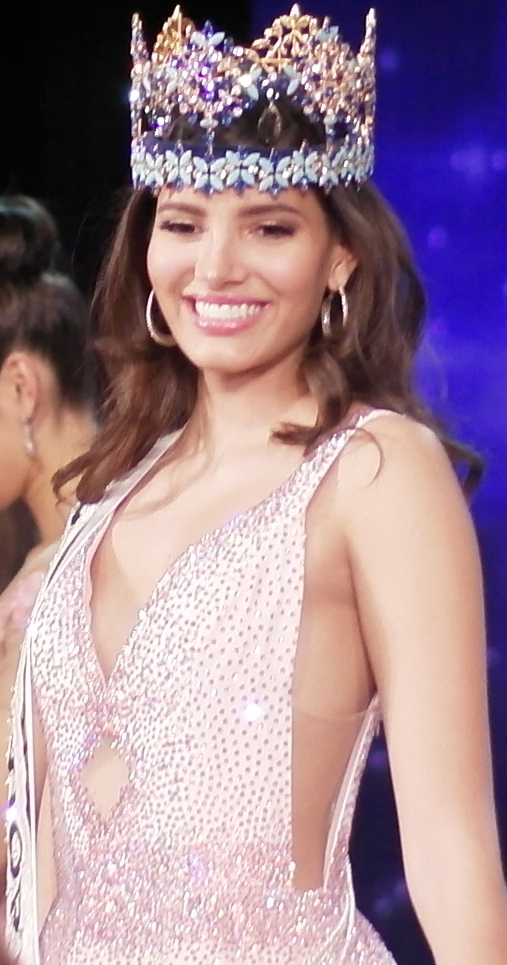
Stephanie Del Valle, Miss World Puerto Rico 2016 and Miss World 2016

== Miss International ==
Miss International Puerto Rico
- Formation: 1960
- Type: Beauty pageant
- Headquarters: San Juan
- Location: Puerto Rico
- Members: Miss International
- Official language: Spanish
- National Director: Joe Amhed

=== History ===
This contest is considered the third most important female beauty event in the world. The Miss Puerto Rico pageant had the rights to this franchise from 1960 to 1997. Then, from 1998 to 2003, the Miss Puerto Rico Tourism pageant, led by Jorge Manrique, and later by former Miss Puerto Rico Tourism and Miss World Puerto Rico Tania Collazo. In 2004, the new Bellezas del Turismo (Tourism Beauties) pageant, also directed by Tania Collazo, obtained the rights until 2006. From 2007 to 2015, the firm Creative Options Inc. chaired by Fernando Oquendo Vega, was in charge of the franchise, which was directed for a while by Desireé Del Río De Jesús, Miss International Puerto Rico 2011.

From 2016 to 2025, Nuestra Belleza Puerto Rico (Our Beauty Puerto Rico) organization chaired by Miguel R. Deliz owned the franchise alongside Miss Supranational Puerto Rico and Miss Grand Puerto Rico. Since 2026, the Miss International Puerto Rico franchise is owned by Joe Amhed, who also manages the Miss Earth, Miss Charm, Miss Global, and The Miss Globe franchises in Puerto Rico.

=== Placements ===
Puerto Rico has two winners in Miss International 1987 and Miss International 2014. As of 2024, Puerto Rico has produced the following placements:

Placement	Quantity	Year
Winner	2	1987 • 2014
1st Runner-Up	0
2nd Runner-Up	0
3rd Runner-Up	1	2011
4th Runner-Up	0
Top 8	0
Top 12 or Top 15	12	1963 • 1976 • 1986 • 1992 • 1997 • 2006 • 2007 • 2008 • 2010 • 2013 • 2019 • 2023
Total	15

=== Representatives ===
Color Key

- Winner of Miss International
- Finalist in the Top 5
- Semifinalist in the Top 8, 12, or 15
- Quarterfinalist in the Top 20

Year	Representative	Town	Placement	Award
2026	Paola Michelle Martínez Otero	Dorado	TBA
2025	Zamira Lee Allende González	Cataño	Unplaced
2024	Zahira Marie Pérez Gerena	Isabela	Unplaced
2023	Amanda Paola Pérez Solís	Rio Grande	Top 15
2022	Paola Cristina González Torres	San Sebastián	Unplaced
2021	Natalia Marie Colón Figueroa	Cataño	Due to COVID-19, no pageant in 2021
2020	Due to the COVID-19 pandemic, no pageant in 2020
2019	Ivana Carolina Irizarry García	Rio Grande	Top 15
2018	Yarelis Yvette Salgado Rodríguez	Toa Alta	Unplaced
2017	Beverly Marie Rodríguez De León	Utuado	Due to Hurricane Maria, did not compete in 2017
2016	Gabriela Berríos Pagán	Toa Baja	Unplaced
2015	Wilmary Monción Román	Salinas	Unplaced
2014	Valerie Hernández Matías	Carolina	Miss International 2014
2013	Ashley Beth Pérez Calderón	Humacao	Top 15
2012	Ashley Michelle Ruiz Rodríguez	Rincón	Unplaced
2011	Desiree Del Rio De Jesús	Bayamón	3rd Runner-Up	Miss; Active
2010	Aideliz Hidalgo Betances	Cayey	Top 15
2009	Mónica Cristina Pastrana González	Manatí	Unplaced
2008	Miriam Ivette Pabón Carrión	Las Piedras	Top 12
2007	Haydil Rivera Escobales	Adjuntas	Top 15
2006	Sharon Haydée Gómez Díaz	Mayagüez	Top 12	Miss Goodwill
2005	Dinorah Collazo Ortíz	Orocovis	Unplaced
2004	Meredith Herrera Morales	Añasco	Unplaced
2003	Dignelis Taymi Jiménez Hernández	Arecibo	Unplaced
2002	Mariela Lugo Marín	Yauco	Unplaced
2001	Lorena Otero Pérez		Unplaced
2000	Rosiveliz Díaz Rodríguez	Caguas	Unplaced
1999	Nahaira Román		Did Not Compete
1998	Jacqueline Negrón Olivieri	Ponce	Did Not Compete
1997	Ymak Farrah Fagundo Soto	Cabo Rojo	Top 15
1996	Lydia Guzmán López De Victoria	Lares	Unplaced
1995	María Del Rocío Arroyo Rivera	Lares	Unplaced
1994	Alice Marina Lee	Utuado	Unplaced
1993	Brenda Esther Robles Cortés	Isabela	Unplaced
1992	Dayanara Torres Delgado	Toa Alta	Top 15
1991	Lizaura Quiñones Torres		Unplaced
1990	Ana Rosa Brito Suárez	San Juan	Unplaced
1989	Michelle Cotto		Unplaced
1988	Yolanda Martínez	Trujillo Alto	Unplaced
1987	Laurie Tamara Simpson Rivera	San Juan	Miss International 1987
1986	Elizabeth Robinson Latalladi	San Germán	Top 15
1985	No Representative
1984	Sandra Beauchamp Roche	Mayagüez	Did Not Compete
1983	No Representative
1982	No Representative
1981	No Representative
1980	No Representative
1979	No Representative
1978	No Representative
1977	Marta Hernández		Unplaced
1976	Yvonne Torres García	Arecibo	Top 15
1975	Gladys Salgado Castillo	Toa Baja	Unplaced
1974	No Representative
1973	No Representative
1972	Miriam; López		Unplaced	Miss Congeniality
1971	Doris Lynette Morales		Unplaced
1970	No Representative
1969	No Representative
1968	Elsie Schroeder Méndez		Unplaced
1967	María Felisa Seda		Unplaced
1966	No pageant in 1966
1965	Iraida Palacios Panzardí		Unplaced
1964	Zoé Sandra Foy Santiago		Unplaced
1963	Aída Mercado Cordero		Top 15
1962	Agnes Toro Garratón		Unplaced
1961	Ivette Monagas		Unplaced
1960	Carmen Sara Látimer		Unplaced

Source: Reinas de Puerto Rico by the Interamerican University of Puerto Rico.

=== Gallery of Miss International ===
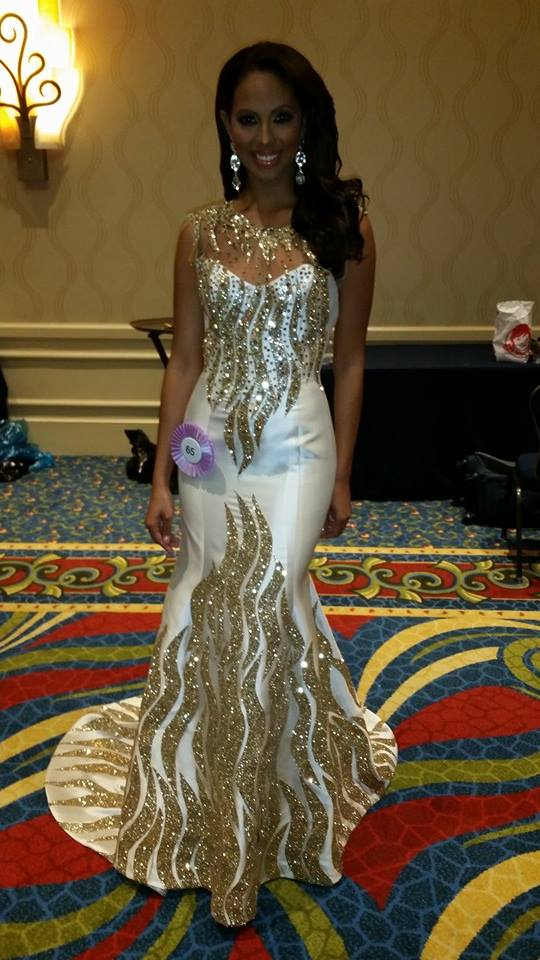
Valerie Hernández, Miss International Puerto Rico 2014 and Miss International 2014

== Miss Earth ==
Miss Earth Puerto Rico
- Formation: 2001
- Type: Beauty pageant
- Location: Puerto Rico
- Members: Miss Earth
- Official language: Spanish
- National Director: Joe Amhed

=== History ===
The Miss Puerto Rico Universe organization sent representatives to Miss Earth between 2001 and 2004 under Magaly Febles. From 2005 to 2013, Puerto Rico's representative to Miss Earth was selected through the Miss Puerto Rico Earth pageant. Under the direction of Shanira Blanco in 2014, the representative was selected through the Miss Mundo Puerto Rico pageant with the 1st Runner-Up being sent to Miss Earth. In 2018, Vanessa de Roide and Joe Amhed took control of the franchise. Currently, Amhed is the sole national director of Miss Earth Puerto Rico.

=== Placements ===
Puerto Rico conquered the crown of Miss Earth with Nellys Pimentel in 2019. In winning, Puerto Rico became one of only five countries to win the four most recognized pageants of Miss Universe, Miss World, Miss International and Miss Earth. Puerto Rico also became the first to win the six most important beauty international competitions: Miss Universe, Miss World, Miss International, Miss Earth, Miss Supranational, and Miss Grand International.

As of 2024, Puerto Rico has produced the following placements:

Placement	Quantity	Year
Winner	1	2019
First; Runner-Up	0
Second; Runner-Up	0
Third; Runner-Up	1	2010
Top 8	4	2005 • 2020 • 2022 • 2024
Top 12 or Top 15	1	2023
Top 20	0
Total	7

=== Representatives ===
Color Key

- Winner of Miss Earth
- Finalist in Top 4
- Finalist in the Top 8
- Semifinalist in the Top 12 or Top 15
- Quarterfinalist in the Top 20

Year	Representative	Town	Placement	Award
2027	Isabella Catherina González Dapena	Ponce	TBA
2026	Cristina Mariel Ríos Reyes (Note: Appointed as Miss Earth Puerto Rico 2026. Previously competed at the virtual edition of Miss Earth 2021, where she was unplaced.)	San Sebastián	TBA
2025	No Representative
2025	Cecilia Acosta Conley	Río Grande	Titleholder for 2026 succeeded but withdrew in September 2025
2025	Valeria Meléndez Oyola	Caguas	Titleholder for 2025 withdrew in July 2025
2024	Bianca Nicole Miranda Caraballo	Mayagüez	Top 8	List: Vonwelt Nature Farm Ambassadress
2023	Victoria Alejandra Arocho Del Valle	Caguas	Top 12
2022	Paulina Nicole Avilés Feshold	Carolina	Top 8	List: Miss Flavor Cartel; (silver) Long Gown Competition (Air Group); (silver) Resort Wear Competition (Air Group)
2021	Cristina Mariel Ríos Reyes	San Sebastián	Unplaced	List: Best in Casual Chic; (bronze) Long Gown
2020	Krystal Badillo Pagán	Canóvanas	Top 8	List: (silver) Evening Gown (Americas)
2019	Nellys Rocío Pimentel Campusano	San Juan	Miss Earth 2019	List: Miss Flora; (silver) Swimsuit (Water Group); (silver) Long Gown (Water Group)
2018	Krystal Xamairy Rivera Barrios	Arecibo	Unplaced	List: Miss Pontefino Hotel; (bronze) Talent (Water Group)
2017	Karla Victoria Aponte Colón	Guaynabo	Unplaced	List: Miss JACMI; Best Eco-Beauty Video; (gold) Swimsuit (Group 3); (gold) Long Gown (Group 3)
2016	No Representative
2015	No Representative
2014	Franceska Toro Medina	Toa Baja	Unplaced	List: (bronze) Darling of the Press; (bronze) Cocktail Wear (Group 1); (bronze) Resort Wear (Group 1); Top 10 Eco-Beauty Video
2013	Velmary Paola Cabassa Vélez	San Germán	Did Not Compete
2012	Darli Arni Pacheco Montañez	Toa Baja	Unplaced	List: (gold) Liter of Light Project Campaign (Group 1); (gold) Resort Wear (Group 1); (gold) Miss Talent (Group 1); (gold) Swimsuit (Group 1)
2011	Agnes Eileen Benítez Santiago	Bayamón	Unplaced
2010	Yeidy Enid Bosques Pérez	Mayagüez	3rd Runner-Up	List: Miss Fire 2010
2009	Dignelis Taymí Jiménez Hernández	Arecibo	Unplaced	List: Miss Placenta
2008	No Representative
2007	No Representative
2006	Camille Collazo Ortíz	San Juan	Unplaced
2005	Vanessa de Roide Toledo	Carolina	Top 8	List: Best in Long Gown; Miss Pond's
2004	Shanira Mariette Blanco Colón	Carolina	Unplaced	List: Miss Leonardo
2003	Norelis Ortiz Acosta	Toa baja	Unplaced
2002	Deidre Rodríguez Santiago	Santa Isabel	Unplaced
2001	Amaricelys Reyes Guzmán	Isabela	Unplaced

Source: Reinas de Puerto Rico by the Interamerican University of Puerto Rico.

=== Gallery of Miss Earth ===
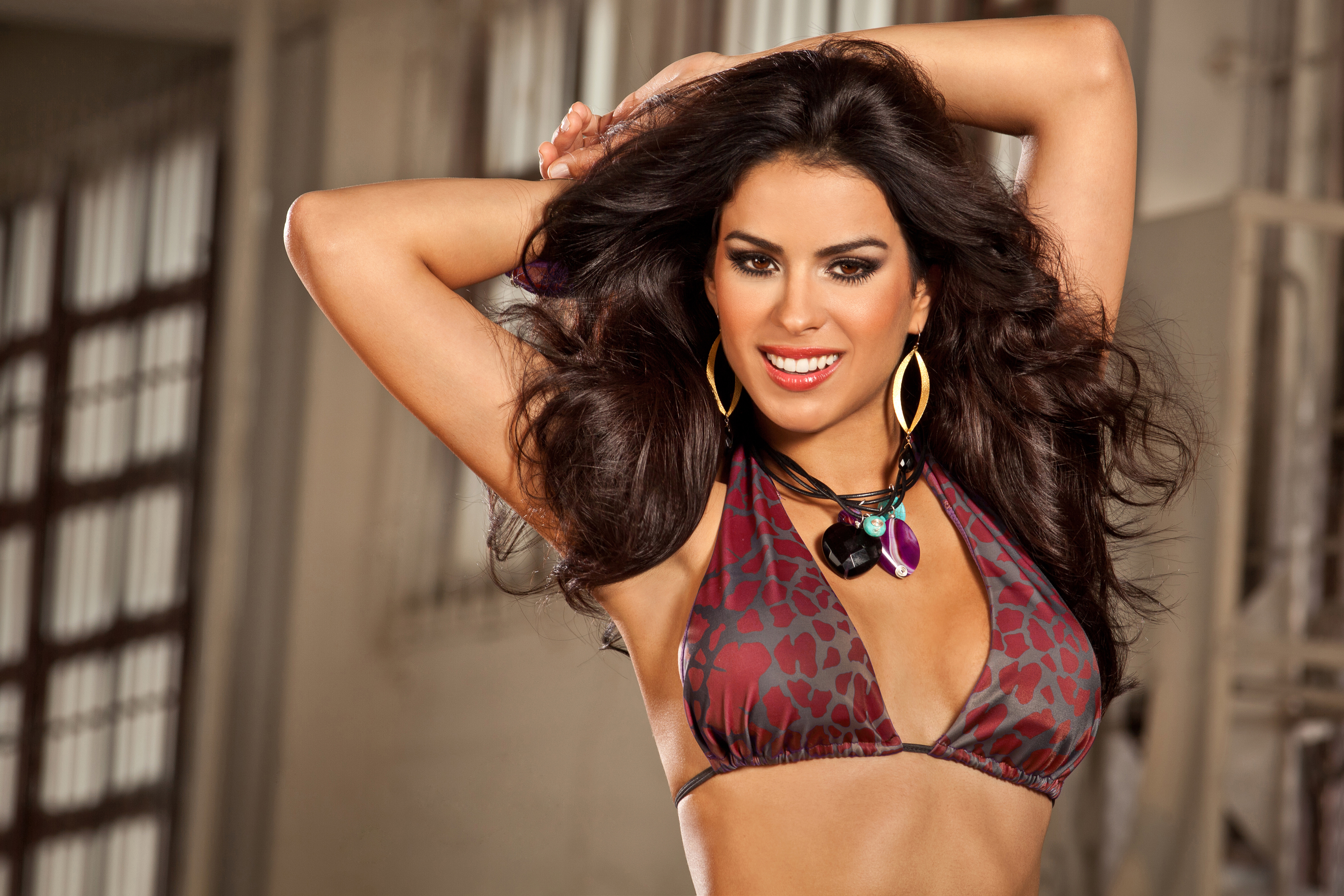
Vanessa De Roide, Miss Earth Puerto Rico 2005 and Top 8 in Miss Earth 2005

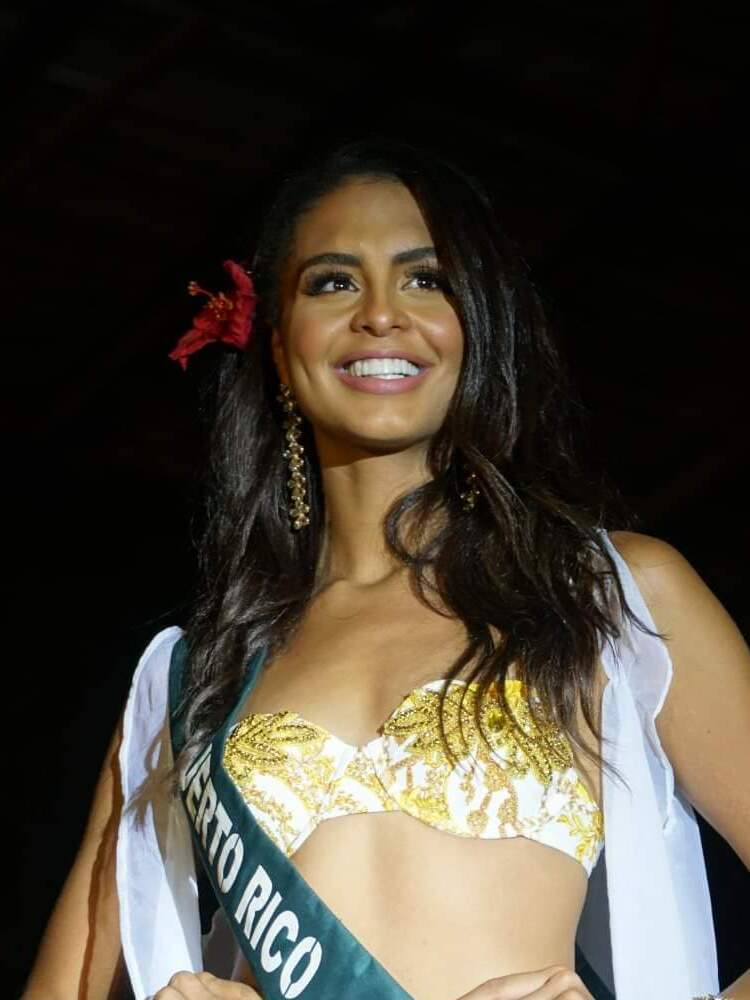
Nellys Pimentel, Miss Earth Puerto Rico 2019 and Miss Earth 2019

== Big Four titleholders ==
Puerto Rico's representatives in the major Big Four beauty pageants of Miss Universe, Miss World, Miss International and Miss Earth. Puerto Rico has performed in these contests as follows:

Color key

- Winner
- Finalist
- Semifinalist or Quarterfinalist

Representatives of Puerto Rico
Last Edition	74th	73rd	63rd	25th
Year	Miss Universe	Miss World	Miss International	Miss Earth
2026	Jennifer Barreto; TBA	Suil Pagán; Top 40	Paola Martínez; TBA	Cristiana Ríos; TBA
2025	Zashely Alicea; Top 12	Valeria Pérez; Top 20	Zamira Allende	No Representative
2024	Jennifer Colón; Top 12	No Pageant	Zahira Pérez	Bianca Caraballo; Top 8
2023	Karla Guilfú; Top 5	Elena Rivera; Top 40	Amanda Pérez; Top 15	Victoria Arocho; Top 12
2022	Ashley Cariño; Top 5	No Pageant	Paola González	Paulina Avilés; Top 8
2021	Michelle Colón; Top 10	Aryam Díaz; Top 40	No Pageant	Cristina Ríos
2020	Estefanía Soto; Top 10	No Pageant	No Pageant	Krystal Badillo; Top 8
2019	Madison Anderson; 1st Runner-Up	Daniella Rodríguez; Top 40	Ivana Irizarry; Top 15	Nellys Pimentel; WINNER
2018	Kiara Ortega; Top 5	Dayanara Martínez	Yarelis Salgado	Krystal Xamairy
2017	Danna Hernández	No Representative	No Representative	Karla Aponte
2016	Brenda Jiménez	Stephanie; Del Valle; WINNER	Gabriela Berríos	No Representative
2015	Catalina Morales	Keysi; Vargas	Wilmary Monción	No Representative
2014	Gabriela Berríos	Génesis Dávila	Valerie Hernández; WINNER	Franceska Toro
2013	Monic Pérez; Top 16	Nadyalee Torres	Ashley Pérez; Top 15	No Representative
2012	Bodine Koehler	Janelee Chaparro; Top 30	Ashley Ruíz	Darla Pacheco
2011	Viviana Ortíz; Top 16	Amanda Vilanova; 2nd Runner-Up	Desiree del Río; 3rd Runner-Up	Agnes Benítez
2010	Mariana Vicente; Top 10	Yara Lasanta; Top 25	Aideliz Hidalgo; Top 15	Yeidy Bosques; 3rd Runner-Up
2009	Mayra Matos; 4th Runner-Up	Jennifer Colón	Mónica Pastrana	Dignelis Jiménez
2008	Ingrid Rivera	Ivonne Orsini; Top 15	Miriam Pabón; Top 12	No Representative
2007	Uma Blasini	Jennifer Guevara; Top 16	Haydil Rivera; Top 15	No Representative
2006	Zuleyka Rivera; WINNER	Thebyam Carrión; Top 17	Sharon Gómez; Top 12	Camille Colazzo
2005	Cynthia Olavarría; 1st Runner-Up	Ingrid Rivera; 2nd Runner-Up	Dinorah Collazo	Vanessa De Roide; Top 8
2004	Alba Reyes; 2nd Runner-Up	Cassandra Castro	Meredith Herrera	Shanira Blanco
2003	Carla Tricoli	Joyceline Montero; Top 20	Dignelis Jiménez	Norelis Ortiz
2002	Isis Casalduc	Cassandra Polo; Top 20	Mariela Lugo	Deidre Rodríguez
2001	Denise Quiñones WINNER	Bárbara Serrano	Lorna Otero	Amaricelys Reyes
2000	Zoraida Fonalledas	Sarybel Velilla	Rosiveliz Díaz	No Pageant (Established in Manila, Philippines in 2001).
1999	Brenda López; Top 10	Arlene Torres	No Representative	No Pageant (Established in Manila, Philippines in 2001).
1998	Joyce Giraud; 2nd Runner-Up	Antonia Alfonso	No Representative	No Pageant (Established in Manila, Philippines in 2001).
1997	Ana Brito Rosa; Top 10	Áurea Marrero	Ymak Fagundo; Top 15	No Pageant (Established in Manila, Philippines in 2001).
1996	Sarybel Velilla	Marissa de la Caridad	Lydia Guzmán	No Pageant (Established in Manila, Philippines in 2001).
1995	Desiree Lowry; Top 6	Swanni Quiñones	María Arroyo	No Pageant (Established in Manila, Philippines in 2001).
1994	Brenda; Robles	Joyce Giraud	Alice; Lee	No Pageant (Established in Manila, Philippines in 2001).
1993	Dayanara Torres; WINNER	Ana Rosa Brito	Brenda Robles	No Pageant (Established in Manila, Philippines in 2001).
1992	Daisy García	Lianabel Rosario	Dayanara Torres; Top 15	No Pageant (Established in Manila, Philippines in 2001).
1991	Lizzette Bouret	Johanna Irizarry	Lizaura Quiñones	No Pageant (Established in Manila, Philippines in 2001).
1990	Luisa Fortuno	Magdalena Pabón	Ana Brito	No Pageant (Established in Manila, Philippines in 2001).
1989	Catalina; Villa	Tania Collazo	Michele; Cotto	No Pageant (Established in Manila, Philippines in 2001).
1988	Isabel Pardo	No Representative	Yolanda Martínez	No Pageant (Established in Manila, Philippines in 2001).
1987	Laurie Simpson; 4th Runner-Up	No Representative	Laurie Simpson; WINNER	No Pageant (Established in Manila, Philippines in 2001).
1986	Elizabeth Robison; Top 10	No Representative	Elizabeth Robison; Top 15	No Pageant (Established in Manila, Philippines in 2001).
1985	Deborah Carthy-Deu; WINNER	Iris Matías; Top 15	No Representative	No Pageant (Established in Manila, Philippines in 2001).
1984	Sandra Beauchamp	María Rosas	No Representative	No Pageant (Established in Manila, Philippines in 2001).
1983	Carmen Bátiz	Fátima Mustafa	No Representative	No Pageant (Established in Manila, Philippines in 2001).
1982	Lourdes Mantero	Jannette Torres	No Representative	No Pageant (Established in Manila, Philippines in 2001).
1981	Carmen; Lotti	Andrenira Ruíz	No Representative	No Pageant (Established in Manila, Philippines in 2001).
1980	Agnes Tañón; Top 12	Michele Torres; Top 15	No Representative	No Pageant (Established in Manila, Philippines in 2001).
1979	Teresa; López	Daisy; López	No Representative	No Pageant (Established in Manila, Philippines in 2001).
1978	Ada Perkins	María Cañizares; Top 15	No Representative	No Pageant (Established in Manila, Philippines in 2001).
1977	Mar Rivera	Didriana del Río	Marta Hernández	No Pageant (Established in Manila, Philippines in 2001).
1976	Elizabeth Zayas	Ivette Rosado; Top 15	Yvonne Torres; Top 15	No Pageant (Established in Manila, Philippines in 2001).
1975	Lorell Carmona	Wilnelia Merced; WINNER	Gladys Salgado	No Pageant (Established in Manila, Philippines in 2001).
1974	Sonia Stege; Top 12	Loyda Valle	No Representative	No Pageant (Established in Manila, Philippines in 2001).
1973	Gladys Colón	Milagros García	Miriam Vargas	No Pageant (Established in Manila, Philippines in 2001).
1972	Bárbara Torres	Ana Nisi Goyco	Miriam López	No Pageant (Established in Manila, Philippines in 2001).
1971	Beba Franco; 3rd Runner-Up	Raquel Quintana	Doris Morales	No Pageant (Established in Manila, Philippines in 2001).
1970	Marisol Malaret; GANADORA	Alma Pérez	No Representative	No Pageant (Established in Manila, Philippines in 2001).
1969	Aída Betancourt	No Representative	No Representative	No Pageant (Established in Manila, Philippines in 2001).
1968	Marylene Carrasquillo	No Representative	Elsa Schroeder	No Pageant (Established in Manila, Philippines in 2001).
1967	Ivonne; Coll	No Representative	María; Seda	No Pageant (Established in Manila, Philippines in 2001).
1966	Carol Barajadas	No Representative	No Pageant	No Pageant (Established in Manila, Philippines in 2001).
1965	Gloria; Cobain	No Representative	Iraida Palacios	No Pageant (Established in Manila, Philippines in 2001).
1964	Yolanda Rodríguez	No Representative	Zoe Santiago	No Pageant (Established in Manila, Philippines in 2001).
1963	Jeanette Biascoechea	No Representative	Aida Mercado; Top 15	No Pageant (Established in Manila, Philippines in 2001).
1962	Ana; Sosa	No Representative	Agnes; Toro	No Pageant (Established in Manila, Philippines in 2001).
1961	Enid del Valle	No Representative	Ivette Monagas	No Pageant (Established in Manila, Philippines in 2001).
1960	No Representative	No Representative	Carmen Latimer	No Pageant (Established in Manila, Philippines in 2001).
1959	No Representative	Lilie; Díaz	No Pageant (Established in California, United States in 1960 and transferred to Tokyo, Japan in 1968).	No Pageant (Established in Manila, Philippines in 2001).
1958	No Representative	No Representative	No Pageant (Established in California, United States in 1960 and transferred to Tokyo, Japan in 1968).	No Pageant (Established in Manila, Philippines in 2001).
1957	Mapita Mercado	No Representative	No Pageant (Established in California, United States in 1960 and transferred to Tokyo, Japan in 1968).	No Pageant (Established in Manila, Philippines in 2001).
1956	Paquita; Vivo	No Representative	No Pageant (Established in California, United States in 1960 and transferred to Tokyo, Japan in 1968).	No Pageant (Established in Manila, Philippines in 2001).
1955	Carmen Betancourt	No Representative	No Pageant (Established in California, United States in 1960 and transferred to Tokyo, Japan in 1968).	No Pageant (Established in Manila, Philippines in 2001).
1954	Lucy; Santiago	No Representative	No Pageant (Established in California, United States in 1960 and transferred to Tokyo, Japan in 1968).	No Pageant (Established in Manila, Philippines in 2001).
1953	Wanda; Irizarry	No Representative	No Pageant (Established in California, United States in 1960 and transferred to Tokyo, Japan in 1968).	No Pageant (Established in Manila, Philippines in 2001).
1952	Marilia; Bernal	No Representative	No Pageant (Established in California, United States in 1960 and transferred to Tokyo, Japan in 1968).	No Pageant (Established in Manila, Philippines in 2001).
1951	No Pageant (Established in California, United States in 1952 and transferred to Florida, United States in 1960).	No Representative	No Pageant (Established in California, United States in 1960 and transferred to Tokyo, Japan in 1968).	No Pageant (Established in Manila, Philippines in 2001).
1950	No Pageant (Established in California, United States in 1952 and transferred to Florida, United States in 1960).	No Pageant (Established in England, United Kingdom in 1951).	No Pageant (Established in California, United States in 1960 and transferred to Tokyo, Japan in 1968).	No Pageant (Established in Manila, Philippines in 2001).

Pageant	Edition	Absent	Unplaced	Placed	Winner
Miss Universe	74	3	43	28	1970 • 1985 • 1993 • 2001 • 2006
Miss; World	73	22	31	20	1975 • 2016
Miss International	63	15	33	15	1987 • 2014
Miss; Earth	25	6	12	7	2019
Total	234	46	119	69	10

== Miss Supranational ==
Miss Supranational Puerto Rico
- Formation: 2010
- Type: Beauty pageant
- Location: Puerto Rico
- Members: Miss Supranational
- Official language: Spanish, English
- National Director: Miguel René Deliz; Valeria Vázquez Latorre

=== History ===
The Miss Supranational representative from Puerto Rico is chosen at the Nuestra Belleza Puerto Rico (Our Beauty Puerto Rico) national beauty pageant. Miss Supranational was established in 2009, but Puerto Rico did not send a representative for the pageant's first edition.

=== Placements ===
Puerto Rico has one winner in Miss Supranational 2018. As of 2026, Puerto Rico has produced the following placements:

Placement	Quantity	Year
Winner	1	2018
1st Runner-Up	1	2021
2nd Runner-Up	1	2011
3rd Runner-Up	0	
4th Runner-Up	2	2017 • 2025
Top 10 or Top 12	3	2014 • 2023 • 2024
Top 20 or Top 25	3	2012 • 2013 • 2019
Total	11	

=== Representatives ===
Color Key

- Winner of Miss Supranational
- Finalist in the Top 5
- Semifinalist in the Top 10 or Top 12
- Quarterfinalist in the Top 20 or Top 25

Year	Representative	Town	Placement	Award
2027	Cecilia Acosta Conley	Río Grande	TBA
2026	Leedanis Ortiz Martínez	Coamo	Unplaced	List: * Top 20 Miss Influencer
2025	Valerie Ann Klepadlo Ramírez	Rincón	4th Runner-Up	List: Top 14 Supra Chat; Top 20 Miss Influencer
2024	Fiorella Medina Pérez	Isabela	Top 12 (6th Runner-Up)	List: Miss Caribbean; Top 4 Supra Chat; Top 11 Top Model
2023	Camille Fabery Diana	Cataño	Top 12 (8th Runner-up)	List: Global Brand Ambassador; Top 10 Top Model
2022	Ariette Natalia Banchs Colón	Ponce	Unplaced
2021	Karla Inelisse Guilfú Acevedo	Patillas	1st Runner-Up	List: Miss Elegance; Top Model of the Caribbean
2020	Due to the COVID-19 pandemic, no pageant in 2020
2019	Shaleyka Cristine Vélez Avilés	Aguada	Top 25	List: Top Model of the Caribbean
2018	Valeria Vázquez Latorre	San Juan	Miss Supranational 2018
2017	Larissa Santiago Escaso	Rio Grande	4th Runner-Up
2016	Velmary Paola Cabassa Vélez	San Germán	Unplaced
2015	Nobiraida Zoet Infante Bosques	Las Marías	Unplaced
2014	Bárbara; Marrero	Bayamón	Top 10	List: Miss Americas; 4th Finalist Miss Talent
2013	Desirée del Río de Jesús	Cayey	Top 20	List: Miss Photogenic; Top 10 Miss Talent
2012	Gabriela Berríos Pagán	Toa Baja	Top 20
2011	Valery Vélez Cuevas	Cataño	2nd Runner-Up
2010	Ketsia Kamille Payano Díaz	San Juan	Unplaced
2009	No Representative

Source: Reinas de Puerto Rico by the Interamerican University of Puerto Rico.

=== Gallery of Miss Supranational ===
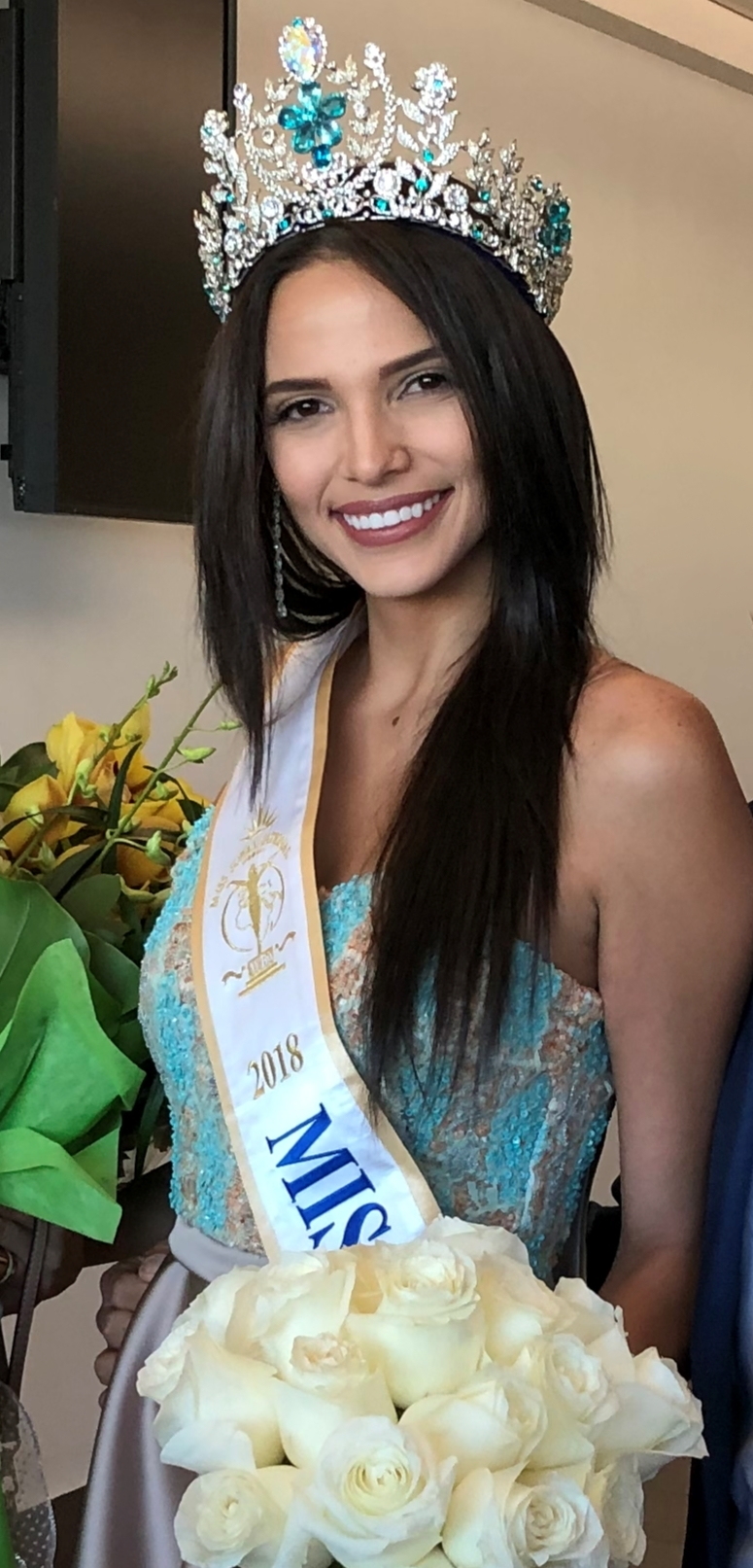
Valeria Vázquez Latorre, Miss Supranational Puerto Rico 2018 and Miss Supranational 2018

== Miss Grand International ==
Miss Grand International Puerto Rico
- Formation: 2013
- Type: Beauty pageant
- Location: Puerto Rico
- Members: Miss Grand International
- Official language: Spanish, English
- National Director: Miguel René Deliz; Valeria Vázquez Latorre

=== History ===
Miss Grand International Puerto Rico is the title of the female beauty contest in Puerto Rico created since 2013 to compete at Miss Grand International. The winner of the title carries it for a period of about a year, and they give meaning and importance to this beauty competition by promoting a stop to war and violence, a campaign which is the slogan of the pageant. The Miss Grand International candidate from Puerto Rico was chosen at the Nuestra Belleza Puerto Rico (Our Beauty Puerto Rico) national beauty pageant from 2016 to 2026. Currently, María Eugenia Félix Paredes, 4th runner-up at Miss Grand International 2024 as Miss Grand Dominican Republic, holds the license.

=== Placements ===
The first Puerto Rican delegate to win the international title of Miss Grand International was Janelee Chaparro in 2013 at the pageant's first edition.

In 2023, there were two candidates of full Puerto Rican descent participating: Cristina Ramos of Puerto Rico, who finished in the top 20, and Sthephanie Miranda of United States of America, who finished as 3rd runner-up.

Puerto Rico consecutively placed in the first 11 editions of the pageant from 2013 to 2023, making it the nation with the longest placing streak in the history of the pageant. As of 2026, Puerto Rico has the second-most placements, after Thailand. Puerto Rico was unplaced in the 2024 and 2025 editions.

As of 2026, Puerto Rico has produced the following placements:

Placement	Quantity	Year
Winner	1	2013
1st Runner-Up	0	
2nd Runner-Up	0	
3rd Runner-Up	4	2016 • 2017 • 2018 • 2021
4th Runner-Up	0	
Top 10 (5th Runner-Up)	4	2019 • 2020 • 2022 • 2026
Top 20	3	2014 • 2015 • 2023
Total	12	

=== Representatives ===
Color Key

- Winner of Miss Grand International
- Finalist in the Top 5
- Finalist and Semifinalist in the Top 10
- Quarterfinalist in the Top 20

Year	Representative	Town	Placement	Award
2026	Vickyani "Vicky" Carbonell Cuevas	Toa Baja	Top 11 (5th Runner-Up)	List: Best in Talent
2025	Sarahí Figueroa Colón	Dorado	Unplaced
2024	Mariangie Alicea Figueroa	Juana Díaz	Unplaced	List: Top 20 National Costume
2023	María Cristina Ramos Ayala	Caguas	Top 20	List: Top 10 National Costume
2022	Oxana Isabel Rivera Álvarez	Dorado	Top 10 (5th Runner-Up)	List: Top 10 Best in Swimsuit
2021	Vivianne Díaz Arroyo	Villalba	3rd Runner-Up	List: Best in Swimsuit
2020	Fabiola Krystal Valentín González	Camuy	Top 10
2019	Hazel Marie Ortíz Méndez	Morovis	Top 10
2018	Nicole Marie Colón Rivera	Cayey	3rd Runner-Up
2017	Brenda Azaria Jiménez Hernández	Aguadilla	3rd Runner-Up
2016	Madison Sara Anderson Berrios	Toa Baja	3rd Runner-Up
2015	Isamar Campos de Jesús	Bayamón	Top 20
2014	Rebeca Valentín García	Dorado	Top 20
2013	Janelee Marcus Chaparro Colón	Barceloneta	Miss Grand International 2013

Source: Reinas de Puerto Rico by the Interamerican University of Puerto Rico.

=== Gallery of Miss Grand International ===
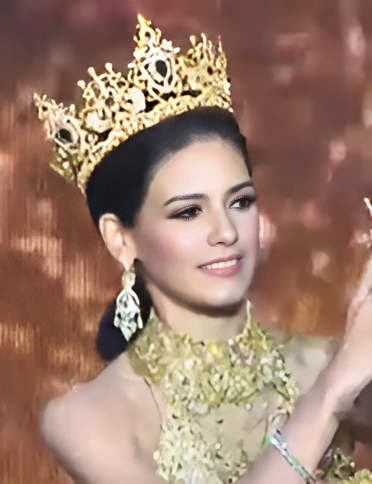
Janelee Chaparro, Miss Grand International Puerto Rico 2013 and Miss Grand International 2013

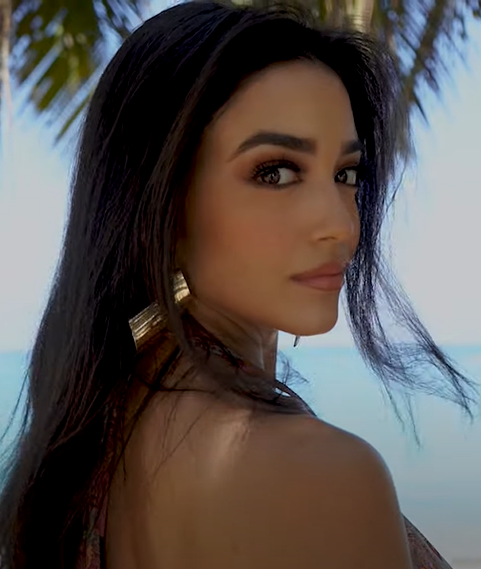
Vivianie Arroyo, Miss Grand International Puerto Rico 2021 and 3rd runner-up in Miss Grand International 2021

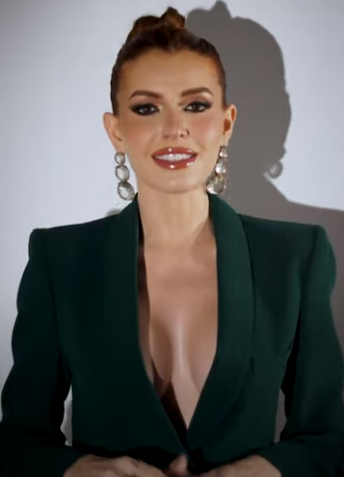
María Cristina Ramos, Miss Grand International Puerto Rico 2023 and Top 20 in Miss Grand International 2023

== Miss Intercontinental ==
Miss Intercontinental Puerto Rico
- Formation: 1971
- Type: Beauty pageant
- Location: Puerto Rico
- Members: Miss Intercontinental
- Official language: Spanish, English

=== History ===
Currently, a pageant is not being held to choose the representative of Puerto Rico for Miss Intercontinental. The delegate is chosen from the group of finalists in Miss World Puerto Rico and prepared by the Miss World Puerto Rico organization, which is presided by Miss World 1975, Wilnelia Merced Forsyth, and directed by Ana Esther Avilés.

=== Placements ===
Puerto Rico has won Miss Intercontinental five times in 1986, 1991, 2010, 2016, and 2024, but the current organization of the pageant only recognizes four winners. Miss Intercontinental does not include Puerto Rico's 1991 win in their official archive.

Miss Intercontinental was held twice in 1991. Carmen Lynda Díaz from Puerto Rico won the first edition held in Lagos, Nigeria by Nigerian owners of the pageant, Silverbird Productions, which held the franchise from 1986 to 1991, and Elena Ivanova from Russia won the second edition held in Bonn, Germany by organizers working under the direction of the new owners of the pageant, a company from Germany, which held the competition in Europe from 1991 to 2003. Despite not being included in the official archive of the pageant by the current owners, Puerto Rico irrefutably won the first edition of 1991 in Nigeria, thus achieving its second Miss Intercontinental crown.

Having produced five winners as of 2024, Puerto Rico is the country with the most crowns, along Venezuela and United States, which have 5 winners each.

Since it began to be awarded in 2008, Puerto Rico is the country with the most Miss North America titles, winning it seven times as of 2024.

As of 2025, Puerto Rico has produced the following placements:

Placement	Quantity	Year
Winner	5	1986 • 1991 • 2010 • 2016 • 2024
1st Runner-Up	6	1988 • 1999 • 2006 • 2012 • 2013 • 2022
2nd Runner-Up	2	1978 • 2009
3rd Runner-Up	1	1990
4th Runner-Up	0
5th Runner-Up	0
Top 5	1	2005
Top 10, Top 12, or Top 20	9	1979 • 1982 • 1997 • 2000 • 2002 • 2011 • 2014 • 2015 • 2023
Total	24

=== Representatives ===
Color Key

- Winner of Miss Intercontinental
- Finalist in the Top 3 or Top 5
- Semifinalist in the Top 10, Top 15, or Top 20

Year	Representative	Town	Placement	Award
2026	Kir Laracuente Santos	Toa Alta	TBA
2025	Gabriela Avilés Figueroa	Las Piedras	Unplaced
2024	María Del Mar Cepero Jiménez	Aibonito	Miss Intercontinental 2024	List: People's Choice; 2nd Finalist National Costume
2023	Pamela Marie Ramos Rodríguez	San Germán	Top 22
2022	Mariela Pepín; Solís	Luquillo	1st Runner-Up	List: Miss North America
2021	No Representative
2020	Due to the COVID-19 pandemic, no pageant in 2020
2019	Daileen Marie Vega Colón	San Juan	Unplaced
2018	Yanelie Marie Santiago Castro	Juana Díaz	Unplaced
2017	Josmarie Soto Mercado	Caguas	Unplaced
2016	Heilymar Rosario Velázquez	San Juan	Miss Intercontinental 2016	List: Miss North America
2015	Suzette Eunice Rivera Sañes	Arecibo	Top 17
2014	Keysi Marie Vargas Vélez	Quebradillas	Top 16	List: Best in Evening Gown
2013	Aleyda Enid Ortiz Rodríguez	Bayamón	1st Runner-Up	List: Miss North America; Best in Swimsuit
2012	Génesis María Dávila Pérez	Arroyo	1st Runner-Up	List: Miss North America
2011	Chanty Marie Vargas Meléndez	San Juan	Top 15
2010	Maydelise Columna Rodríguez	Orocovis	Miss Intercontinental 2010	List: Miss North America
2009	Rosana Padró Meléndez	Carolina	2nd Runner-Up	List: Miss North America
2008	No Representative
2007	No Representative
2006	Vanessa Zayda Claudio Rodríguez	San Juan	1st Runner-Up	List: Miss Congeniality
2005	Saritza Alvarado Marrero	Cayey	Top 5
2004	Angieliz Vázquez Collazo	Cidra	Unplaced
2003	No Representative
2002	Yarissa Marie Tolentino Félix	Humacao	Top 12	List: Miss AYK Beauty
2001	Emily Ruiz		Unplaced
2000	Yormarie Ortíz Medina	Caguas	Top 12
1999	Miredys Peguero Vega	Isabela	1st Runner-Up	List: Miss Internet
1998	No Representative
1997	Olga; García	Guaynabo	Top 10	List: Miss Photogenic
1996	Nellianne Arce González	Manatí	Unplaced
1995	No Representative
1994	No Representative
1993	No Representative
1992	Ileana Pinto	Humacao	Unplaced
1991	Carmen Lynda Díaz	Caguas	Miss Intercontinental 1991
1990	Elba Morales Borges		3rd Runner-Up
1989	Iris Lizelba Acosta García	Fajardo	Unplaced
1988	Laurie Tamara Simpson Rivera	San Juan	1st Runner-Up
1987	No Representative
1986	Elizabeth Robinson Latalladi	San Germán	Miss Intercontinental 1986
1985	No Representative
1984	No pageant in 1984
1983	Carmen Batíz Vergara	Trujillo Alto	Unplaced	List: Miss Photogenic
1982	Mary Ann Cortés Camacho	Carolina	Top 12
1981	Emeshe Juhász Alvarado	Caguas	Unplaced
1980	No Representative
1979	Yolanda Rosaly Alfonso	San Juan	Top 12
1978	Ada Cecille Perkins Flores	San Juan	2nd Runner-Up
1977	Myrna Ocasio	San Juan	Unplaced	List: Miss Talent
1976	Vanessa Latimer	San Juan	Unplaced
1975	Vilma Luz Rodríguez		Unplaced
1974	Maritza Motta Bacó	Añasco	Unplaced
1973	Aida Igaravidez López	San Juan	Unplaced
1972	No Representative
1971	No Representative

Source: Reinas de Puerto Rico by the Interamerican University of Puerto Rico.

=== Gallery of Miss Intercontinental ===
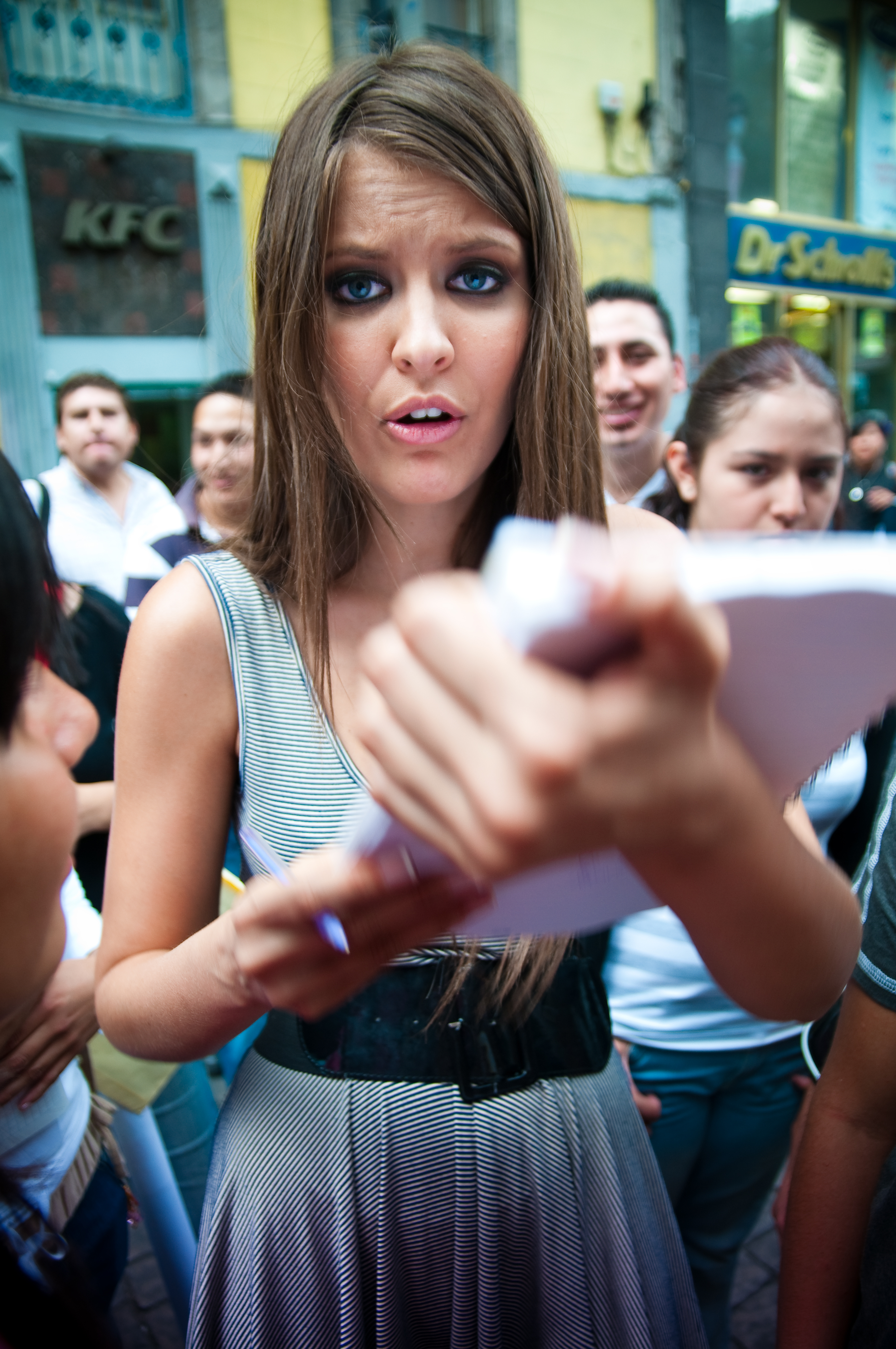
Vanessa Claudio, Miss Intercontinental Puerto Rico 2006 and 1st Runner-Up of Miss Intercontinental 2006

== Grand Slam titleholders ==
Puerto Rico's representatives in the two pageants of Miss Supranational and Miss Grand International, which together with the Big Four—Miss Universe, Miss World, Miss International, and Miss Earth—make up the major Grand Slam beauty pageants. Also included is the oldest other pageant, Miss Intercontinental. Puerto Rico has performed in these contests as follows:

Color key

- Winner
- Finalist
- Semifinalist or Quarterfinalist

Representatives of Puerto Rico
Last Edition	17th	14th	52nd
Year	Miss Supranational	Miss Grand International	Miss Intercontinental
2026	Leedanis Ortiz	Vicky Carbonell; Top 11	TBA
2025	Valerie Klepadlo; 4th Runner-Up	Sarahí Figueroa	Gabriela Avilés
2024	Fiorella Medina; Top 12	Mariangie Alicea	María Cepero; WINNER
2023	Camille Fabery; Top 12	Cristina Ramos; Top 20	Pamela Ramos; Top 22
2022	Ariette Banchs	Oxana Rivera; Top 10	Mariela Pepín; 1st Runner-Up
2021	Karla Guilfú; 1st Runner-Up	Vivianne Díaz; 3rd Runner-Up	No Representative
2020	No Pageant	Fabiola Valentín; Top 10	No Pageant
2019	Shaleyka Vélez; Top 25	Hazel Ortíz; Top 10	Daileen Vega
2018	Valeria Vázquez; WINNER	Nicole Colón; 3rd Runner-Up	Yanelie Santiago
2017	Larissa Santiago; 4th Runner-Up	Brenda Jiménez; 3rd Runner-Up	Josmarie Soto
2016	Velmary Cabassa	Madison Anderson; 3rd Runner-Up	Heilymar Rosario; WINNER
2015	Nobiraida Infante	Isamar de Jesús; Top 20	Suzette Rivera; Top 20
2014	Barbara Marrero; Top 10	Rebeca Valentín; Top 20	Keysi Vargas; Top 16
2013	Desirée del Río; Top 20	Janelee Chaparro; WINNER	Aleyda Ortiz; 1st Runner-Up
2012	Gabriela Berríos; Top 20	No Pageant (Established in Thailand in 2013).	Génesis Dávila; 1st Runner-Up
2011	Valery Veléz; 2nd Runner-Up	No Pageant (Established in Thailand in 2013).	Chanty Vargas; Top 15
2010	Ketsia Payano	No Pageant (Established in Thailand in 2013).	Maydelise Columna; WINNER
2009	No Representative	No Pageant (Established in Thailand in 2013).	Rosana Padro; 2nd Runner-Up
2008	No Pageant (Established in Poland in 2009).	No Pageant (Established in Thailand in 2013).	No Representative
2007	No Pageant (Established in Poland in 2009).	No Pageant (Established in Thailand in 2013).	No Representative
2006	No Pageant (Established in Poland in 2009).	No Pageant (Established in Thailand in 2013).	Vanessa Claudio; 1st Runner-Up
2005	No Pageant (Established in Poland in 2009).	No Pageant (Established in Thailand in 2013).	Saritza Alvarado; Top 5
2004	No Pageant (Established in Poland in 2009).	No Pageant (Established in Thailand in 2013).	Angieliz Vázquez
2003	No Pageant (Established in Poland in 2009).	No Pageant (Established in Thailand in 2013).	No Representative
2002	No Pageant (Established in Poland in 2009).	No Pageant (Established in Thailand in 2013).	Yarissa Tolentino; Top 12
2001	No Pageant (Established in Poland in 2009).	No Pageant (Established in Thailand in 2013).	Emily Ruiz
2000	No Pageant (Established in Poland in 2009).	No Pageant (Established in Thailand in 2013).	Yormarie Ortíz; Top 12
1999	No Pageant (Established in Poland in 2009).	No Pageant (Established in Thailand in 2013).	Miredys Peguero; 1st Runner-Up
1998	No Pageant (Established in Poland in 2009).	No Pageant (Established in Thailand in 2013).	No Representative
1997	No Pageant (Established in Poland in 2009).	No Pageant (Established in Thailand in 2013).	Olga García; Top 10
1996	No Pageant (Established in Poland in 2009).	No Pageant (Established in Thailand in 2013).	Nellianne Arce
1995	No Pageant (Established in Poland in 2009).	No Pageant (Established in Thailand in 2013).	No Representative
1994	No Pageant (Established in Poland in 2009).	No Pageant (Established in Thailand in 2013).	No Representative
1993	No Pageant (Established in Poland in 2009).	No Pageant (Established in Thailand in 2013).	No Representative
1992	No Pageant (Established in Poland in 2009).	No Pageant (Established in Thailand in 2013).	Ileana Pino
1991	No Pageant (Established in Poland in 2009).	No Pageant (Established in Thailand in 2013).	Carmen Lynda Díaz; WINNER
1990	No Pageant (Established in Poland in 2009).	No Pageant (Established in Thailand in 2013).	Elba Morales; 3rd Runner-Up
1989	No Pageant (Established in Poland in 2009).	No Pageant (Established in Thailand in 2013).	Iris Acosta
1988	No Pageant (Established in Poland in 2009).	No Pageant (Established in Thailand in 2013).	Laurie Simpson; 1st Runner-Up
1987	No Pageant (Established in Poland in 2009).	No Pageant (Established in Thailand in 2013).	No Representative
1986	No Pageant (Established in Poland in 2009).	No Pageant (Established in Thailand in 2013).	Elizabeth Robinson; WINNER
1985	No Pageant (Established in Poland in 2009).	No Pageant (Established in Thailand in 2013).	No Representative
1984	No Pageant (Established in Poland in 2009).	No Pageant (Established in Thailand in 2013).	No Pageant
1983	No Pageant (Established in Poland in 2009).	No Pageant (Established in Thailand in 2013).	Carmen Batíz
1982	No Pageant (Established in Poland in 2009).	No Pageant (Established in Thailand in 2013).	Mary Ann Cortés; Top 12
1981	No Pageant (Established in Poland in 2009).	No Pageant (Established in Thailand in 2013).	Emeshe Juhasz
1980	No Pageant (Established in Poland in 2009).	No Pageant (Established in Thailand in 2013).	No Representative
1979	No Pageant (Established in Poland in 2009).	No Pageant (Established in Thailand in 2013).	Yolanda Alfonso; Top 12
1978	No Pageant (Established in Poland in 2009).	No Pageant (Established in Thailand in 2013).	Ada Perkins; 2nd Runner-Up
1977	No Pageant (Established in Poland in 2009).	No Pageant (Established in Thailand in 2013).	Myrna Ocasio
1976	No Pageant (Established in Poland in 2009).	No Pageant (Established in Thailand in 2013).	Vanessa Latimer
1975	No Pageant (Established in Poland in 2009).	No Pageant (Established in Thailand in 2013).	Vilma Rodríguez
1974	No Pageant (Established in Poland in 2009).	No Pageant (Established in Thailand in 2013).	Maritza Motta
1973	No Pageant (Established in Poland in 2009).	No Pageant (Established in Thailand in 2013).	Ada Igaravidez
1972	No Pageant (Established in Poland in 2009).	No Pageant (Established in Thailand in 2013).	No Representative
1971	No Pageant (Established in Poland in 2009).	No Pageant (Established in Thailand in 2013).	No Representative
1970	No Pageant (Established in Poland in 2009).	No Pageant (Established in Thailand in 2013).	No Pageant (Established in Aruba in 1971. Currently in Panama and Germany).

Pageant	Edition	Absent	Unplaced	Placed	Winner
Miss Supranational	17	1	5	11	2018
Miss Grand International	14	0	2	12	2013
Miss Intercontinental	53	13	16	24	1986 1991• 2010 • 2016 • 2024
Total	81	14	21	46	7

== Miss Global ==
Miss Global Puerto Rico
- Formation: 2023
- Type: Beauty pageant
- Location: Puerto Rico
- Members: Miss Global
- Official language: Spanish, English
- National Director: Joe Amhed

=== History ===
The Miss Global candidate from Puerto Rico is chosen at the Miss Earth Puerto Rico national beauty pageant, which is directed by Joe Amhed.

=== Placements ===
The first Puerto Rican delegate to win the international title of Miss Global was Ashley Meléndez in January 2024 at the pageant's 2023 edition, where she competed against 70 other delegates. She was the first candidate from the Puerto Rican mainland to have participated in the contest, making her one of the few women in history who have won an international beauty pageant title as a debuting delegate.

As of 2026, Puerto Rico has produced the following placements:

Placement	Quantity	Year
Winner	1	2023
1st Runner-Up	0	
2nd Runner-Up	2	2025 • 2026
3rd Runner-Up	0	
4th Runner-Up	0	
Top 10 or Top 15	0	
Top 20 or Top 25	0	
Total	3	

=== Representatives ===
Color Key

- Winner of Miss Global
- Finalist in the Top 3 or Top 5
- Semifinalist in the Top 10 or Top 15
- Quarterfinalist in the Top 20 or Top 25

Year	Representative	Town	Placement	Award
2027	Anaysa Soto Cortés	Moca	TBA
2026	Bianca Nicole Miranda Caraballo	Mayagüez	2nd Runner-Up	Miss Photogenic
2026	Gabriela Vázquez Pomales	Salinas	Withdrew
2025	Ediris Joan Rivera Berrios	Barranquitas	2nd Runner-Up
2024	No edition held for 2024
2023	Ashley Meléndez Ríos	Fajardo	Miss Global 2023
2022	No Representative
2021	No Representative
2020	No Representative
2019	No Representative
2018	No Representative
2017	No Representative
2016	No Representative
2015	No Representative
2014	No Representative
2013	No Representative

== Miss Cosmo ==
Miss Cosmo Puerto Rico
- Formation: 2024
- Type: Beauty pageant
- Location: Puerto Rico
- Members: Miss Cosmo
- Official language: Spanish, English
- National Director: Miguel René Deliz; Valeria Vázquez Latorre

=== History ===
The Miss Cosmo candidate from Puerto Rico is chosen in the national beauty pageant Nuestra Belleza Puerto Rico (Our Beauty Puerto Rico) presided by Miguel René Deliz and directed by Valeria Vázquez Latorre.

=== Placements ===
Until 2025, Puerto Rico has produced the following placements:

Placement	Quantity	Year
Winner	0	
1st Runner-Up	0	
Top 5	0	
Top 10	0	
Top 21	1	2024
Total	1	

=== Representatives ===
Color Key

- Winner of Miss Cosmo
- Finalist as First Runner-Up
- Semifinalist in the Top 5
- Semifinalist in the Top 10
- Quarterfinalist in the Top 21

Year	Representative	Town	Placement	Award
2026	Chelsey Mary García Agrón	Añasco	TBA
2025	Ana Paola Figueroa Diez	Carolina	Unplaced
2024	Keylianne Marie Rodríguez Marrero	Dorado	Top 21

== Miss Charm ==
Miss Charm Puerto Rico
- Formation: 2023
- Type: Beauty pageant
- Location: Puerto Rico
- Members: Miss Charm
- Official language: Spanish, English
- National Director: Joe Amhed

=== History ===
From 2023 to 2025, the Miss Charm candidate from Puerto Rico was chosen by the Nuestra Belleza Puerto Rico (Our Beauty Puerto Rico) organization, which is presided by Miguel René Deliz and directed by Valeria Vázquez Latorre. Since 2026, Joe Amhed is the owner of the Miss Charm Puerto Rico franchise alongside the Miss International, Miss Earth, Miss Global, and The Miss Globe franchises in Puerto Rico.

=== Placements ===
Until 2025, Puerto Rico has produced the following placements:

Placement	Quantity	Year
Winner	0	
1st Runner-Up	0	
2nd Runner-Up	0	
Top 6	0	
Top 10	1	2023
Top 20	2	2024 • 2025
Total	3	

=== Representatives ===
Color Key

- Winner of Miss Charm
- Finalist in the Top 3
- Semifinalist in the Top 6
- Semifinalist in the Top 10
- Quarterfinalist in the Top 20

Year	Representative	Town	Placement	Award
2026	Natalia Andrea Gómez Rivera	Coamo	TBA
2025	Nicole Hernández Ferreira	Toa Baja	Top 20
2024	Carolina Mía Gómez Cumba	Salinas	Top 20
2023	Alejandra Pagán Crespo	Vega Baja	Top 10

== Universal Woman ==
Universal Woman Puerto Rico
- Formation: 2024
- Type: Beauty pageant
- Location: Puerto Rico
- Members: Universal Woman
- Official language: Spanish, English
- National Director: Ana Aviles

=== History ===
The representative for Universal Woman from Puerto Rico is elected by the organization of "Universal Woman Puerto Rico" presided and directed by Ana Aviles since 2026. David Díaz Villegas was director in 2024 and 2025.

=== Placements ===
Until 2026, Puerto Rico has produced the following placements:

Placement	Quantity	Year
Winner	1	2025
1st Runner-Up	0	
2nd Runner-Up	0	
3rd Runner-Up	0	
4th Runner-Up	0	
Top 12 or Top 15	1	2024 • 2026
Top 24	0	
Total	3	

=== Representatives ===
- Winner of Universal Woman
- Finalist in the Top 5
- Semifinalist in the Top 12
- Quarterfinalist in the Top 24

Year	Representative	Town	Placement	Award
2026	Amanda Ayala Rodríguez	Mayagüez	Top 15	Miss Photogenic
2025	Ivana Carolina Irizarry García	Lares	Miss Universal Woman 2025
2024	Elaine Marie Rosado Rivera	Orocovis	Top 12	Miss Caribbean
2023	No Representative

== MGI All Stars ==
MGI All Stars Puerto Rico
- Formation: 2026
- Type: Beauty pageant
- Location: Puerto Rico
- Members: MGI All Stars
- Official language: Spanish, English

=== History ===
The organization of MGI All Stars Puerto Rico is in charge of choosing the candidate who represents Puerto Rico in MGI All Stars.

=== Placements ===
Until 2026, Puerto Rico has produced the following placements:

Placement	Quantity	Year
Winner	0	
1st Runner-Up	0	
2nd Runner-Up	0	
3rd Runner-Up	0	
4th Runner-Up	0	
Top 10	0	
Top 25	0	
Total	0	

=== Representatives ===
- Winner of MGI All Stars
- Finalist in the Top 5
- Semifinalist in the Top 10
- Quarterfinalist in the Top 25

Year	Edition	Representative	Town	Placement	Award
2026	2nd	Génesis María Dávila Pérez	Arroyo	TBA
2026	2nd	Jennifer Colón Alvarado	Orocovis	Did not compete
2026	1st	Nadyalee Torres López	Aguas Buenas	Did not compete

== Miss America ==
=== Miss Puerto Rico Scholarship Program / Miss Puerto Rico America ===
Miss Puerto Rico
- Formation: 1937
- Type: Scholarship Pageant
- Headquarters: San Juan
- Location: Puerto Rico
- Members: Miss America
- Official language: Spanish and English
- Website: misspuertorico.org

Puerto Rico sends a delegate to the Miss America competition. 2010 was the first time Puerto Rico had done so since 1961.

Annika Schneider of San Juan was appointed Miss Puerto Rico on July 1, 2026. She competed for the title of Miss America 2027 on September 6, 2026, at the Kravis Center for the Performing Arts in West Palm Beach, Florida.

==== Representatives ====
Year	Representative	Hometown	Age	Local Title	Talent	Placement	Award	Notes
No contests for Miss Puerto Rico America from 1921 to 1947.
1948	Irma Nydia Vázquez							
1949	Avelina Medraño Baella	Santurce	18					
Miss America title was post dated in 1950, with Miss Puerto Rico 1950 and onwards competing for Miss America 1951 and onwards.
1950	Evangelina Moragón							
1951	Otilia Jiménez						Miss Congeniality	
1952	Helga Edmee Monroig							
1953	Nydia Power							
1954	María del Carmen Mejías							
1955	Gladys Rodríguez							
1957	Winnie Rodríguez							
No contests for Miss Puerto Rico America from 1958 to 1960.
1961	Rosita Giusti				Classical Vocal		Best in Talent Competition; Miss Congeniality	
No contests for Miss Puerto Rico America from 1962 to 2008.
2009	Miriam Ivette Pabón Carrión	Las Piedras	24		Vocal		Lifestyle and Fitness Preliminary Award (Swimsuit Award)	
2010	Mariselle Morales	San Juan	24		Vocal			
2011	Laura Ramirez	Arecibo	21		Ballet en Pointe		Duke of Edinburgh Bronze Medal	
2012	Kiaraliz Medina	Moca	20		Flamenco Dancing			
2013	Shenti Lauren	Barranquitas	24		African Folkloric Dance			
2014	Yarelis Salgado	Toa Alta	20		Flamenco Fusion			
2015	Destiny Vélez	Trujillo Alto	19		Acoustic Drums			
2016	Carole Rigual	Bayamón	22		Monologue, "Crossroads"			
2017	No contest in 2017. No competition held for 2018 or 2019.							
2018	No contest in 2017. No competition held for 2018 or 2019.							
2019	No contest in 2017. No competition held for 2018 or 2019.							
2020	Due to the impact of COVID-19 pandemic, no contest/competition for the year 2020							
2021	No competition held for 2021 or 2022. No contest in 2023.							
2022	No competition held for 2021 or 2022. No contest in 2023.							
2023	No competition held for 2021 or 2022. No contest in 2023.							
2024	Wilma Victoria Richiez Mateo	San Juan	22	Miss Dorado	Dance Twirl			
2025	Diann Reyes-Basilio	San Juan	20	Miss San Juan	Dance			
2026	Annika Pylar Schneider Almodóvar	San Juan	21	N/A	HERStory			Previously Miss North Carolina's Teen 2023
