= Nuestra Belleza Latina 2016 =

- Season 10
- Presented by: Javier Poza; Chiquinquira Delgado; Francisca Lachapel (Backstage Reporter)
- Judges: Osmel Sousa; Jaqueline Bracamontes; Daniel Arenas
- Winner: Clarissa Molina
- Runner-up: Setareh Khatibi
- No. of episodes: 13

Release
- Original network: Univision
- Original release: February 28 – May 22, 2016

Season chronology
- ← Previous; Nuestra Belleza Latina 2015 Next → Nuestra Belleza Latina 2018

Nuestra Belleza Latina 2016 (NBL VIP) is the tenth season of Nuestra Belleza Latina aired on Univision. It was the first "All Star" season from the entire series. The season premiered on Sunday February 28, 2016.

The season finale was on May 22, 2016.

The winner of that season was Clarissa Molina from Dominican Republic, who became the first winner of that contest to be crowned by a compatriot. Francisca Lachapel was the winner of Nuestra Belleza Latina 2015, thus generating the first Back to Back in the history of Nuestra Belleza Latina

There were no auditions this season as this season featured twenty-six returning contestants representing the show's nine seasons.

== Casting and changes ==
This is the first ever "All Star" season of the entire show featuring twenty-six returning semifinalist representing all nine Seasons for a second chance to win the title. The top 12 will have the privilege to get back to the competition. This season will not feature a luxurious "Beauty Mansion" like previous seasons but rather a "Farm House" where all twelve "All Stars" must show they have what it takes to make it to the top. Setareh Khatibi from NBL 2012 (Season 6), Josephine Ochoa from NBL 2014 (Season 8) and Nathalia Casco from NBL 2015 (Season 9) are the only Runner-Up contestants selected to compete from all nine previous seasons. No casting process will be shown prior to the first gala. There will be two shows showing highlights of the contestants in their previous season and what they have been doing since their season, the pool of twenty-six will be reduced to twenty then to twelve. For the first time this season will be completely interactive and the public will be able to decide which girls they want back into the competition, what challenges they want the girls to do and what photo-shoots they should do. In addition to Head Judge Osmel Sousa, and beauty queen turned actress and TV Host Jaqueline Bracamontes there is a new judge this season. Colombian Actor and India Catalina Awards nominee Best Actor Daniel Arenas will be joining the panel of judges. The backstage segment called "Rincon Social" will be hosted by Nuestra Belleza Latina 2015 winner, Francisca Lachapel, who will interview the guest, contestants and present what social media is saying about the show. For the first time since NBL 2012 (Season 6) the title sequence will be changed and for the first time since the original season NBL 2007 (Season 1) the logo of the show is revamped and re-titled NBL VIP. For the final twelve, more than one contestant from the same season can be chosen to compete and a season may also have no representative. The age requirement of 27 has been dropped since some previous contestants are over the previous age limit.

== 2016 All-Star Contestants ==
Final results	Contestant
Winner	Dominican Republic – Clarissa Molina
2nd Place	Mexico – Setareh Khatibi
3rd Place	Puerto Rico – Catherine Castro
4th Place	Colombia – Barbara Turbay
5th Place	Mexico – Ligia de Uriarte
6th Place	Puerto Rico – Patricia Corcino
7th Place	Guatemala – Josephine Ochoa
8th Place	Honduras – Nathalia Casco
9th Place	Dominican Republic – Zoila Ceballos
10th Place	Mexico – Anna Valencia
11th Place	Mexico – Berenice Guzman
12th Place	Cuba – Lisandra Silva

== Elimination chart ==
Contestants
Top 13	Top 12	Winner	Runner Up

Won challenge of the week	First Call-Out	Nominated for the 12th Spot	Nominated for Top 5	Eliminated by fellow contestants	Bottom 4	Bottom 3	Bottom 2	Guest	Eliminated

Stage:			Finalists										Semi-Final	Finale
Week:			1	2	3	4	5	6	7	8	9	10	11	12
Place	Country	Contestants	Results											
1st	(Dominican Republic)	Clarissa Molina	Group 2	Top 12	Safe	Safe	Safe	Safe	Safe	Bottom 3	Safe	Safe	Safe	Winner
2nd	(Mexico)	Setareh Khatibi	Group 1	Top 12	Safe	Safe	Bottom 2	Safe	Safe	Bottom 2	Safe	Safe	Safe	Runner-Up
3rd	(Puerto Rico)	Catherine Castro	Group 1	Top 12	Bottom 3	Safe	Bottom 4	Bottom 3	Safe	Safe	Safe	Safe	Bottom 2	3rd Place
4th	(Colombia)	Bárbara Turbay	Group 1	Top 12	Safe	Bottom 3	Safe	Safe	Won	Won	Top 6	Bottom 3	Safe	4th Place
5th	(Mexico)	Ligia De Uriarte	Group 2	Top 12	Safe	Safe	Won	Safe	Bottom 3	Won	Top 6	Bottom 2	5th Place	Guest
6th	(Puerto Rico)	Patricia Corcino	Group 1	Top 12	Safe	Won	Safe	Safe	Bottom 2	8th Place	Top 6	6th Place		Guest
7th	(Guatemala)	Josephine Ochoa	Group 1	Nominated	Safe	Safe	Safe	Bottom 2	Won	Bottom 2	7th Place	Eliminated		Guest
8th	(Honduras)	Nathalia Casco	Group 2	Top 12	Safe	Bottom 2	Bottom 4	Bottom 3	Bottom 2	Quit	Resigned			
9th	(Dominican Republic)	Zolia Ceballos	Group 1	Top 12	Safe	Won	Won	Bottom 2	9th Place	Guest	Eliminated			
10th	(Mexico)	Anna Valencia	Group 2	Top 12	Won	Won	Bottom 2	10th Place	Eliminated					Guest
11th	(Mexico)	Berenice Guzmán	Group 2	Top 12	Bottom 2	Bottom 2	11th Place	Eliminated						
12th	(Cuba)	Lisandra Silva	Group 2	Top 12	Bottom 2	12th Place	Eliminated							
13th	(Venezuela)	Karol Scott	Group 1	Nominated	13th Place	Eliminated								

== Countries being represented ==
CPW	Country	Position														Year Previously Won
CPW	Country	0	1	2	3	4	5	6	7	8	9	10	Finale			Year Previously Won
check	Dominican Republic	2nd	1st	1st	1st	6th	2nd	1st	2nd	1st	3rd	2nd	3rd	2nd	1st	2015 and 2016
check	Mexico	1st	6th	6th	6th	2nd	4th	4th	4th	3rd	4th	4th	1st	1st	2nd	2007 and 2010
check	Puerto Rico	4th	5th	2nd	3rd	1st	5th	2nd	1st	4th	5th	3rd	2nd	3rd		2008, 2012, 2014
—	Colombia	5th	3rd	4th	2nd	3rd	1st	1st	3rd	4th	2nd	1st	4th			None
—	Guatemala	7th	4th	3rd	4th	5th	3rd	5th								None
—	Honduras	6th	2nd	5th	5th	4th	R									None
check	Cuba	3rd	7th													2009
—	Venezuela	8th														None
—	Ecuador	9th														None

- Eliminated
- First Place
- Winner
- Runner-Up
- CPW: Countries Previously won
- R : Resigned
- : Countries Previously won

== Episodes ==
=== Season 10, Episode 0: The Queens are Back ===
Original Air Date—21 February 2016 Seven of the previous winners of Nuestra Belleza Latina sit down with Lourdes Stephen and Jomari Goyso to discuss their triumphs, obstacles and what they think of the ladies returning.

- Guest Hosts: Fashion Guru & Beauty Expert Jomari Goyso, anchor and TV host for Sal y Pimienta Lourdes Stephen
- Guest Appearances: "The Czar of Beauty" and Head Judge Osmel Sousa, First Winner of Nuestra Belleza Latina (NBL 2007) Alejandra Espinoza, Winner of NBL 2010 Ana Patricia Gonzalez, Winner of NBL 2011 Nastassja Bolívar, Winner of NBL 2012 Vanessa De Roide, Winner of NBL 2013 Marisela Demontecristo, Winner of NBL 2014 Aleyda Ortiz, current Winner of NBL 2015 Francisca Lachapel

=== Season 10, Episode 1: Season of Redemption ===
Original Air Date—28 February 2016 Group one of 14 "All★Stars" arrives to Miami beginning the toughest competition. Highlights of their best moments and failures of their season shown. As well as what they have been up to since their last appearance on their original season. The girls were divided into seven total pairs, showing their talents from singing, acting, hosting or dancing.

- Guest Appearances: First Winner of NBL 2007 Alejandra Espinoza, Winner of NBL 2011 Nastassja Bolívar, current Winner of NBL 2015 Francisca Lachapel
- Musical Guest: Yandel, Pitbull & "El Chacal"
- Challenge Guest: journalist & award-winning anchor Enrique Acevedo, Sal y Pimenta TV Host and former Nuestra Belleza Latina judge Carlos Calderón

Group One Battles
CR	Season	Rank	Contestant	X	Contestant	Rank	Season	CR
(Guatemala)	NBL ★ 2014	2nd	Josephine Ochoa	VS.	Patricia Corcino	6th	NBL ★ 2011	(Puerto Rico)
(Cuba)	NBL ★ 2007	9th	Martha María López	VS.	Catherine Castro	3rd	NBL ★ 2015	(Puerto Rico)
(Mexico)	NBL ★ 2012	2nd	Setareh Khatibi	VS.	Barbara Turbay	4th	NBL ★ 2013	(Colombia)
(Mexico)	NBL ★ 2015	7th	Cynthia Perez	VS.	Cynthia Piña	10th	NBL ★ 2010	(Mexico)
(Venezuela)	NBL ★ 2010	4th	Barbara Moros	VS.	Karol Scott	3rd	NBL ★ 2012	(Venezuela)
(Mexico)	NBL ★ 2008	5th	Leticia Castro	VS.	Nicole Suarez	3rd	NBL ★ 2011	(Colombia)
(Dominican Republic)	NBL ★ 2008	4th	Zoila Ceballos	VS.	Diana Cano	7th	NBL ★ 2011	(Ecuador)

- CR stands for Country Representing
- Rank stands for original placement on original season

=== Season 10, Episode 2: Last Chance ===
Original Air Date—6 March 2016 Group two of the last ten contestants will arrive to Miami in the hopes of making it to the competition. Highlights of their best moments and failures of their season shown. As well as what they have been up to since their last appearance on their original season. The girls were divided into seven total pairs, showing their talents from singing, acting, hosting or dancing. The final two girls that will form the top 26 will be revealed to the public.

- Musical Guest: Prince Royce & Espinoza Paz
- Quit the competition: (Mexico) Prissila Sanchez

Group Two Battles
CR	Season	Rank	Contestant	X	Contestant	Rank	Season	CR
(Mexico)	NBL ★ 2009	11th	Anna Valencia	VS.	Fanny Vargas	5th	NBL ★ 2012	(Mexico)
(Dominican Republic)	NBL ★ 2015	4th	Clarissa Molina	VS.	Valeria Moreno	9th	NBL ★ 2014	(Colombia)
(Mexico)	NBL ★ 2011	5th	Miriam Hernandez	VS.	Marina Ruiz	5th	NBL ★ 2013	(Mexico)
(Mexico)	NBL ★ 2012	12th	Ligia de Uriarte	VS.	Prissila Sanchez	7th	NBL ★ 2014	(Mexico)
(Dominican Republic) / (Mexico)	NBL ★ 2009	10th	Susie De Los Santos	VS.	Berenice Guzman	6th	NBL ★ 2009	(Mexico)
(Cuba)	NBL ★ 2015	8th	Lisandra Silva	VS.	Nathalia Casco	2nd	NBL ★ 2015	(Honduras)

- CR stands for Country Representing
- Rank stands for original placement on original season

=== Season 10, Episode 3: All Stars Chosen ===
Original Air Date—13 March 2016 The first 5 contestants with the lowest votes will be eliminated. The top 20 will have a challenge chosen by the judges. Only the Top 12 will move on to the next stage of the competition and move into the "Mansion de la Belleza" (Mansion of Beauty) as they get one step closer to becoming the first All Star winner.

- First Call-Out (At the Final Runway): (Mexico) Setareh Khatibi
- Guest Appearances: Former Nuestra Belleza Latina Judge Julian Gil, Noticiero Univision Edición Nocturna anchor Ilia Calderón
- Musical Guest: Farruko

(ages stated are at time of contest)

Previous Season	Contestant	Previous Rank	Age	Country Representing
NBL ★ 2012 (Season 6)	Setareh Khatibi	Runner-Up	29	Mexico
NBL ★ 2008 (Season 2)	Zoila Ceballos	4th Place	30	Dominican Republic
NBL ★ 2009 (Season 3)	Anna Valencia	11th Place	27	Mexico
NBL ★ 2014 (Season 8)	Josephine Ochoa	Runner-Up	23	Guatemala
NBL ★ 2015 (Season 9)	Lisandra Silva	8th Place	28	Cuba
NBL ★ 2012 (Season 6)	Ligia De Uriarte	12th Place	24	Mexico
NBL ★ 2015 (Season 9)	Nathalia Casco	Runner-Up	29	Honduras
NBL ★ 2009 (Season 3)	Berenice Guzman	6th Place	33	Mexico
NBL ★ 2015 (Season 9)	Clarissa Molina	4th Place	24	Dominican Republic
NBL ★ 2011 (Season 5)	Patricia Corcino	6th Place	27	Puerto Rico
NBL ★ 2013 (Season 7)	Barbara Turbay	4th Place	24	Colombia
NBL ★ 2015 (Season 9)	Catherine Castro	3rd Place	25	Puerto Rico

=== Season 10, Episode 4: Back to Basics ===
Original Air Date—20 March 2016 The finalists move into the Mansion with a twist. NBL Camp will be the temporary place for the finalists, they will need to earn their stay at the Mansion. Tensions rise as the pressure start. The final girl chosen to be the final 12th All Star was (Guatemala) Josephine Ochoa.

- First Call-Out (At the Final Runway): (Mexico) Ligia De Uriarte
- Nominated by the Judges: (Cuba) Lisandra Silva, (Puerto Rico) Catherine Castro and (Mexico) Berenice Guzman
- Saved by Fellow Contestants: (Puerto Rico) Catherine Castro
- Nominees of the week: (Cuba) Lisandra Silva and (Mexico) Berenice Guzman
- Challenge Winner: (Mexico) Anna Valencia
- Guest Appearances: Eugenio Debrez
- Musical Guest: CNCO & "" El Dasa

=== Season 10, Episode 5: First Star down ===
Original Air Date—27 March 2016 The first elimination and challenge took place as the first All Star left the competition.

- First Call-Out (At the Final Runway): (Dominican Republic) Clarissa Molina
- Nominees of previous Week: (Mexico) Berenice Guzman and (Cuba) Lisandra Silva
- Eliminated from the Competition: (Cuba) Lisandra Silva from NBL ★ 2015 (Season 9)
- Challenge Winner: Pink Team ( (Mexico) Setareh Khatibi, (Puerto Rico) Catherine Castro, (Mexico) Berenice Guzman, (Dominican Republic) Zoila Ceballos, (Mexico) Anna Valencia, and (Puerto Rico) Patricia Corcino)
- Nominated by Judges: (Honduras) Nathalia Casco, (Colombia) Barbara Turbay and (Mexico) Berenice Guzman
- Saved by Fellow Contestants: (Colombia) Barbara Turbay
- Nominees of the week: (Honduras) Nathalia Casco and (Mexico) Berenice Guzman
- Musical Guest: Roberto Tapia & Chino & Nacho

=== Season 10, Episode 6: Staying on Top ===
Original Air Date—3 April 2016 The second elimination and challenge took place as the second All Star left the competition.

- First Call-Out (At the Final Runway): (Dominican Republic) Zoila Ceballos
- Nominees from Previous Week: (Mexico) Berenice Guzmán and (Honduras) Nathalia Casco
- Eliminated from the Competition: (Mexico) Berenice Guzmán from NBL ★ 2009 (Season 3)
- Nominated by Judges: (Puerto Rico) Catherine Castro, (Honduras) Nathalia Casco, (Mexico) Setareh Khatibi and (Mexico) Anna Valencia
- Saved by Fellow Contestants: (Puerto Rico) Catherine Castro & (Honduras) Nathalia Casco
- Nominees of the week: (Mexico) Setareh Khatibi and (Mexico) Anna Valencia
- Challenge Winner: (Dominican Republic) Zoila Ceballos and (Mexico) Ligia de Uriarte
- Musical Guest: Chiquis and Plan B

=== Season 10, Episode 7: Back to the Beauty Mansion ===
Original Air Date—10 April 2016 The third elimination and challenge will take place as the third All Star leaves the competition, as the girls try getting back into the Mansion and leave NBL Camp for good.

- First Call-Out (At the Final Runway): (Dominican Republic) Clarissa Molina
- Nominees from Previous Week: (Mexico) Setareh Khatibi and (Mexico) Anna Valencia
- Eliminated from the Competition: (Mexico) Anna Valencia from NBL ★ 2009 (Season 3)
- Automatically Nominated: (Dominican Republic) Zoila Ceballos
- Nominated by Fellow Contestants: (Puerto Rico) Catherine Castro & (Honduras) Nathalia Casco
- Saved by Judges: (Puerto Rico) Catherine Castro & (Honduras) Nathalia Casco
- Nominated by Judges: (Guatemala) Josephine Ochoa
- Nominees of the week: (Dominican Republic) Zoila Ceballos & (Guatemala) Josephine Ochoa
- Challenge Winner: (Dominican Republic) Clarissa Molina
- Guest Appearances: Alejandra Espinosa
- Musical Guest: Diego Boneta & Régulo Caro.

=== Season 10, Episode 8: Beauty Lip Sync Battle ===
Original Air Date—17 April 2016 The fourth elimination and challenge will take place as the next All Star leaves the competition. As one All Star moves back into the NBL Camp for insubordination the remaining queens are trying to get back into the Mansion and leave NBL Camp for good.

- First Call-Out (At the Final Runway): (Colombia) Bárbara Turbay
- Nominees from Previous Week: (Dominican Republic) Zoila Ceballos & (Guatemala) Josephine Ochoa
- Eliminated from the Competition: (Dominican Republic) Zoila Ceballos from NBL ★ 2008 (Season 2)
- Nominated by Judges: (Mexico) Ligia De Uriarte, (Honduras) Nathalia Casco and (Puerto Rico) Patricia Corcino
- Saved by Judges: (Mexico) Ligia De Uriarte
- Nominees of the week: (Honduras) Nathalia Casco and (Puerto Rico) Patricia Corcino
- Camp Challenge Winners: (Puerto Rico) Catherine Castro & (Puerto Rico) Patricia Corcino
- Lip Sync Challenge Winners: (Guatemala) Josephine Ochoa, (Mexico) Setareh Khatibi, (Colombia) Bárbara Turbay, (Dominican Republic) Clarissa Molina, (Puerto Rico) Catherine Castro & (Dominican Republic) Zoila Ceballos
- Huntsman Movie Challenge Winners: (Mexico) Ligia De Uriarte, (Mexico) Setareh Khatibi, (Dominican Republic) Clarissa Molina & (Puerto Rico) Catherine Castro
- Guest Appearances: Alejandra Espinosa, Fedro helping Bárbara Turbay in challenge
- Musical Guest: "Calibre 50 & Alexis & Fido

Lip Sync Battles
CR	Season	Representing	Contestant	X	Contestant	Representing	Season	CR
(Guatemala)	NBL ★ 2014	Paulina Rubio—"Y Yo Sigo Aquí"	Josephine Ochoa	VS.	Ligia De Uriarte	Thalía—"Arrasando"	NBL ★ 2012	(Mexico)
(Dominican Republic)	NBL ★ 2015	Katy Perry—"Roar"	Clarissa Molina	VS.	Catherine Castro	Sia—"Chandelier"	NBL ★ 2015	(Puerto Rico)
(Mexico)	NBL ★ 2012	Interpreting "El Pollito Pio"	Setareh Khatibi	VS.	Nathalia Casco	Interpreting "Se dice de mi"	NBL ★ 2015	(Honduras)
(Colombia)	NBL ★ 2013	Gloria Trevi—"Todos Me Miran"	Bárbara Turbay	VS.	Patricia Corcino	Alejandra Guzmán—Eternamente Bella	NBL ★ 2011	(Puerto Rico)
(Dominican Republic)	NBL ★ 2008	Pitbull—"El Taxi"	Zoila Ceballos	Contestant did not battle anyone, performed by herself but still judged for her performance				

Color	Description
	Lip Sync Battle Winner
	Lip Sync Battle Tied

=== Season 10, Episode 9: Goodbye to the Farm House ===
Original Air Date—24 April 2016 The remaining girls move back into the Beauty Mansion. Tensions arise after a shocking nomination. The fight elimination and challenge will take place as the next All Star leaves the competition. As they battle to make it to the upcoming quarter-finals of the competition. After a shocking elimination, Nathalia Casco decided to leave the competition voluntarily stating her emotional and mental sanity was her priority over the competition, leaving her spot for fellow contestant Patricia Corcino.

- First Call-Out (At the Final Runway): (Mexico) Ligia De Uriarte
- Nominees from Previous Week: (Honduras) Nathalia Casco and (Puerto Rico) Patricia Corcino
- Eliminated from the Competition: (Puerto Rico) Patricia Corcino from NBL ★ 2011 (Season 5)
- Quit from the Competition: (Honduras) Nathalia Casco from NBL ★ 2015 (Season 9)
- Reinstated to the Competition: (Puerto Rico) Patricia Corcino from NBL ★ 2011 (Season 5)
- Nominated by Judges: (Guatemala) Josephine Ochoa, (Mexico) Setareh Khatibi, (Dominican Republic) Clarissa Molina and (Honduras) Nathalia Casco
- Saved by Judges: (Dominican Republic) Clarissa Molina
- Nominees of the week: (Guatemala) Josephine Ochoa and (Mexico) Setareh Khatibi
- Live Show Challenge Winner: (Colombia) Bárbara Turbay, (Puerto Rico) Catherine Castro, (Mexico) Ligia de Uriarte and (Puerto Rico) Patricia Corcino
- Guest Appearances: Mexican Actress, Marlene Favela & previous participant (Dominican Republic) Zoila Ceballos
- Musical Guest: Zion & Lennox, Luis Coronel & Reykon

Colors and Pictures Challenge
CR	Season	Color	Contestant	X	Contestant	Color	Season	CR
(Guatemala)	NBL ★ 2014	OceanBlue	Josephine Ochoa; Colored by Clarissa	VS.	Bárbara Turbay; Colored by Catherine	Purple	NBL ★ 2013	(Colombia)
(Mexico)	NBL ★ 2012	Yellow	Setareh Khatibi; Colored by Ligia	VS.	Catherine Castro; Colored by Josephine	Royal Blue	NBL ★ 2015	(Puerto Rico)
(Mexico)	NBL ★ 2012	Pink	Ligia De Uriarte; Colored by Nathalia	VS.	Clarissa Molina; Colored by Bárbara	Red	NBL ★ 2015	(Dominican Republic)
(Puerto Rico)	NBL ★ 2011	Orange	Patricia Corcino; Colored by Setareh	VS.	Nathalia Casco; Colored by Patricia	Green	NBL ★ 2015	(Honduras)

Color	Description
	Picture Color Winner

=== Season 10, Episode 10: Major Revelations ===
Original Air Date—1 May 2016 The top seven girls open up with major revelations of hardships of their past. As the finale awaits, a shocking twist throws stirs up the competition. As the sixth All Star leaves the competition, the girls are one step closer to the finals.

- First Call-Out (At the Final Runway): (Puerto Rico) Patricia Corcino
- Nominees from Previous Week: (Guatemala) Josephine Ochoa and (Mexico) Setareh Khatibi
- Eliminated from the Competition: (Guatemala) Josephine Ochoa from NBL ★ 2014 (Season 8)
- Challenge Winner of the week: No Challenge winner was determined
- Final Judges Nominations: (Mexico) Setareh Khatibi, (Mexico) Ligia De Uriarte, (Puerto Rico) Catherine Castro, (Dominican Republic) Clarissa Molina, (Colombia) Barbara Turbay, and (Puerto Rico) Patricia Corcino
- Musical Guest: Jencarlos Canela, Reik & Jacob Forever

News/Dance Challenge
CR	Season	Performance	Contestant	X	Contestant	Performance	Season	CR
(Puerto Rico)	NBL ★ 2015	Wilfrido Vargas — "Que Sera"; Merengue	Catherine Castro; Contacto Deportivo	VS.	Ligia de Uriarte; Primer Impacto	Hairspray — "Without Love"; Broadway	NBL ★ 2012	(Mexico)
(Colombia)	NBL ★ 2013	La Sonora Dinamita — "Amor de Mis Amores"; Cumbia	Bárbara Turbay; Sal y Pimienta	VS.	Patricia Corcino; Despierta America	Pharrell Williams — "Get Lucky"; Disco	NBL ★ 2011	(Puerto Rico)
(Guatemala)	NBL ★ 2014	Madonna — "Material Girl (Broadway Version)"; Rock & Roll	Josephine Ochoa; El Gordo y La Flaca	VS.	Setareh Khatibi; Despierta America	Roberto Junior — "El Coco No"; Regional Mexicano	NBL ★ 2012	(Mexico)
(Dominican Republic)	NBL ★ 2015	Shakira — "Ojos Así " Bollywood	Clarissa Molina; El Gordo y La Flaca	Contestant did not battle anyone but was still judged for her performance				

=== Season 10, Episode 11: Road to the Finale ===
Original Air Date—8 May 2016 The seventh elimination and challenge take place as the seventh All Star leaves the competition.

- First Call-Out (At the Runway): (Mexico) Setareh Khatibi
- Nominees from Previous Week: (Dominican Republic) Clarissa Molina, (Puerto Rico) Catherine Castro, (Mexico) Ligia De Uriarte, (Colombia) Barbara Turbay, (Puerto Rico) Patricia Corcino, and (Mexico) Setareh Khatibi
- Nominees having fewest public vote: (Colombia) Barbara Turbay, (Mexico) Ligia De Uriarte, and (Puerto Rico) Patricia Corcino
- Saved by Judges: (Colombia) Barbara Turbay
- Saved by Fellow Contestants: (Mexico) Ligia Uriate
- Eliminated from the Competition: (Puerto Rico) Patricia Corcino from NBL ★ 2011 (Season 5)
- Challenge Winner of the week: (Mexico) Setareh Khatibi
- Final Judges Nominations: (Colombia) Barbara Turbay, (Puerto Rico) Catherine Castro, (Mexico) Setareh Khatibi, (Mexico) Ligia De Uriarte, and (Dominican Republic) Clarissa Molina.
- Guest Appearances: Argentine-born Puerto Rican actor, model and previous judge of NBL Julian Gil, Cuban Actor Pedro Moreno & Argentine Actor Diego Olivera
- Musical Guest: Maluma & Thalía

=== Season 10, Episode 12: Up Close & Above ===
Original Air Date—15 May 2016 The last elimination and challenge take place as the eight All Star leaves the competition. The top 4 advance to the finale.

- First Call-Out (At the Runway): (Colombia) Barbara Turbay
- Nominees from Previous Week: (Colombia) Barbara Turbay, (Puerto Rico) Catherine Castro, (Mexico) Setareh Khatibi, (Mexico) Ligia De Uriarte, and (Dominican Republic) Clarissa Molina
- Eliminated from the Competition: (Mexico) Ligia De Uriarte
- All Star ★ NBL VIP Top 4: (Mexico) Setareh Khatibi, (Colombia) Barbara Turbay, (Dominican Republic) Clarissa Molina and (Puerto Rico) Catherine Castro
- Musical Guest: Gente de Zona J Balvin & Calibre 50

=== Season 10, Episode 13: All Star ★ NBL VIP is... ===
- All Star ★ NBL VIP Top 4: (Mexico) Setareh Khatibi, (Colombia) Barbara Turbay, (Dominican Republic) Clarissa Molina, (Puerto Rico) Catherine Castro
- All Star ★ NBL VIP winner: (Dominican Republic) Clarissa Molina
- All Star ★ NBL VIP runner-up: (Mexico) Setareh Khatibi
- All Star ★ NBL VIP second runner-up: (Puerto Rico) Catherine Castro
- All Star ★ NBL VIP third runner-up: (Colombia) Barbara Turbay
- Musical Guest: Wisin, Pablo Alboran & Julión Álvarez

== Summaries ==
=== Call-out order ===
Runway Call-Out Order
Order	Episodes													
Order	26 Finalists	Top 20	Top 12	4	5	6	7	8	9	10	11	12(Finale)		Top 2
1	Josephine	Zoila	Setareh	Ligia	Clarissa	Zoila	Clarissa	Bárbara	Ligia	Setareh	Bárbara	Setareh	Setareh	Clarissa
2	Patricia	Clarissa	Zoila	Bárbara	Catherine	Ligia	Bárbara	Setareh	Bárbara	Catherine	Setareh	Catherine	Clarissa	Setareh
3	Martha Ma.	Nicole	Anna	Setareh	Ligia	Bárbara	Ligia	Clarissa	Catherine	Clarissa	Clarissa	Clarissa	Catherine	
4	Catherine	Josephine	Lisandra	Nathalia	Setareh	Clarissa	Patricia	Catherine	Patricia	Bárbara	Catherine	Bárbara		
5	Setareh	Diana	Ligia	Anna	Zoila	Patricia	Setareh	Josephine	Clarissa	Ligia	Ligia			
6	Bárbara T.	Anna	Catherine	Zoila	Patricia	Josephine	Nathalia	Ligia	Setareh	Patricia				
7	Cynthia Pe.	Leticia	Berenice	Clarissa	Josephine	Catherine	Catherine	Nathalia	Josephine					
8	Cynthia Pi.	Susie	Clarissa	Patricia	Anna	Nathalia	Josephine	Patricia						
9	Bárbara M.	Ligia	Patricia	Josephine	Bárbara	Setareh	Zoila							
10	Karol	Valeria	Bárbara T.	Catherine	Nathalia	Anna								
11	Leticia	Karol	Nathalia	Berenice	Berenice									
12	Nicole	Fanny	Josephine	Lisandra										
13	Zolia.	Setareh	Karol											
14	Diana	Bárbara T.	Leticia											
15	Anna	Catherine	Valeria											
16	Fanny	Patricia	Cynthia Pe.											
17	Clarissa	Berenice	Diana											
18	Valeria	Cynthia Pe.	Fanny											
19	Miriam	Nathalia	Susie											
20	Marina	Lisandra	Nicole											
21	Ligia	Cynthia Pi.												
22	Sussie	Barbara M.												
23	Berenice	Marina												
24	Lisandra	Miriam												
25	Nathalia	Martha Ma.												
26	Prissila													

- In episode 1, Group One formed by 14 semi-finalists was shown.
- In episode 2, Group Two with the remainder of 26 the semi-finalists was shown. One quit reducing the contestants to 25.
- In episode 3, the pool of 25 semi-finalists was reduced to the top 20 who moved on to the next round of the competition.
- In episode 3, the pool of 20 semi-finalists was reduced to the top 13, with the first eleven making it to the competition.
- In episode 4, the final contestant in Top 12, chosen among the remaining two contestants, was announced.

Color	Description	Used
	The contestant won the competition	Top 2
	The contestant won second place	Top 2
	The contestant was eliminated	Top 20-Finale
	The contestant was saved by fellow contestants	Week 4–6, 10
	The contestant was saved by the judges	Week 7-10
	The contestant was saved by the viewers vote	Week 4–7, 9
	The contestant won challenge of the week	Week 4-10
	The contestant won the challenge of the week, and was saved from elimination	Week 5
	The contestant was chosen to take the 12th spot	Top 12
	The contestant was nominated for 12th spot but eliminated	Top 12
	The contestant resigned from the competition	Top 26, Week 8
	The contestant was reinstated into the competition	Week 9
	Contestant was part of Group 1	Top 26
	Contestant was part of Group 2	Top 26

=== All★Stars ===
The following candidates are the top 26 "All Stars" Semi-Finalist Chosen to return:

(12 contestants selected from different season will be chosen to compete)

Participants selected to compete according to the order of their season and original season's rank

	Original Season	Original Rank	Contestant	Age	Country Representing
1	NBL ★ 2007 (Season 1)	9th Place	Martha María López	28	Cuba
2	NBL ★ 2008 (Season 2)	4th Place	Zoila Ceballos	30	Dominican Republic
3	NBL ★ 2008 (Season 2)	5th Place	Leticia Castro	26	Mexico
4	NBL ★ 2009 (Season 3)	6th Place	Berenice Guzman	33	Mexico
5	NBL ★ 2009 (Season 3)	10th Place	Susie De Los Santos	27	Dominican Republic
6	NBL ★ 2009 (Season 3)	11th Place	Anna Valencia	27	Mexico
7	NBL ★ 2010 (Season 4)	4th Place	Barbara Moros	29	Venezuela
8	NBL ★ 2010 (Season 4)	10th Place	Cynthia Piña	32	Mexico
9	NBL ★ 2011 (Season 5)	3rd Place	Nicole Suarez	24	Colombia
10	NBL ★ 2011 (Season 5)	5th Place	Miriam Hernandez	26	Mexico
11	NBL ★ 2011 (Season 5)	6th Place	Patricia Corcino	27	Puerto Rico
12	NBL ★ 2011 (Season 5)	7th Place	Diana Cano	29	Ecuador
13	NBL ★ 2012 (Season 6)	Runner-Up	Setareh Khatibi	29	Mexico
14	NBL ★ 2012 (Season 6)	3rd Place	Karol Scott*	28	Venezuela
15	NBL ★ 2012 (Season 6)	5th Place	Fanny Vargas	28	Mexico
16	NBL ★ 2012 (Season 6)	12th Place	Ligia De Uriarte	24	Mexico
17	NBL ★ 2013 (Season 7)	4th Place	Barbara Turbay	24	Colombia
18	NBL ★ 2013 (Season 7)	5th Place	Marina Ruiz	24	Mexico
19	NBL ★ 2014 (Season 8)	Runner-Up	Josephine Ochoa	23	Guatemala
20	NBL ★ 2014 (Season 8)	7th place	Prissila Sanchez	28	Mexico
21	NBL ★ 2014 (Season 8)	9th Place	Valeria Moreno	23	Colombia
22	NBL ★ 2015 (Season 9)	Runner-Up	Nathalia Casco	29	Honduras
23	NBL ★ 2015 (Season 9)	3rd Place	Catherine Castro	25	Puerto Rico
24	NBL ★ 2015 (Season 9)	4th Place	Clarissa Molina	24	Dominican Republic
25	NBL ★ 2015 (Season 9)	7th Place	Cynthia Perez	27	Mexico
26	NBL ★ 2015 (Season 9)	8th Place	Lisandra Silva	29	Cuba

- * Semi-Finalist, (Venezuela) Karol Scott representing NBL ★ 2012 (Season 6) was nominated to become the 12th contestant to participate but was eliminated in top 13.
- * Semi-Finalist, (Mexico) Prissila Sanchez representing NBL ★ 2014 (Season 8) Quit the competition on second episode due to her pregnancy. She became ineligible to participate thus being eliminated.

Color	Description
	All Star Chosen

Contestants nominated to fill the last two spots (25th & 26th) but did not make the final placing.

(Participants selected to compete according to the order of their season and original season's rank)

	Original Season	Original Rank	Contestant	Age	Country Representing
1	NBL ★ 2010 (Season 4)	3rd Place	Tatiana Delgado	26	Puerto Rico
2	NBL ★ 2013 (Season 7)	Runner-Up	Audris Rijo	30	Dominican Republic
