= Nuestra Belleza Latina 2013 =

- Season 7
- Presented by: Giselle Blondet
- Judges: Osmel Sousa; Lupita Jones; Julián Gil
- Winner: Marisela Demontecristo
- Runner-up: Audris Rijo
- No. of episodes: 11

Release
- Original network: Univision
- Original release: March 10 – May 19, 2013

Season chronology
- ← Previous; Nuestra Belleza Latina 2012 Next → Nuestra Belleza Latina 2014

Nuestra Belleza Latina 2013 is the seventh season of Nuestra Belleza Latina. The season premiered on Univision on March 10, 2013.

The auditions were shown on the first show, prior to the final 12 are revealed. Auditions were held January through February 4, 2013 in seven major US cities (New York City, New York; Chicago, Illinois; Houston, Texas; Phoenix, Arizona; San Jose, California; Los Angeles, California; and Miami, Florida) and in San Juan, Puerto Rico. During the audition process, about 75 young women were given passes to the semi-finals in Miami. Two contestants were chosen from online Auditions, with the help of public votes.

The winner of the contest will be awarded a contract to be one of the new personality faces on many of Univision's programs and award shows; a chance to win more than $250,000 in cash and prizes; a brand new car - Kia Forte; appear on the cover of Cosmopolitan en Español magazine and reign as Nuestra Belleza Latina for a year. This was the last season for Giselle Blondet to host.

The winner of Nuestra Belleza Latina 2013 was Marisela Demontecristo from El Salvador.

== 2013 Judges ==
Judges	Occupation	Judging Years
Osmel Sousa	President of the Miss Venezuela Organization	2007–Present
Lupita Jones	Former Miss Universe 1991 and President of Nuestra Belleza México	2008–Present
Julián Gil	Puerto Rican Actor and Model	2008 & 2010-2013

=== Changes and contestants ===
For the first time in Nuestra Belleza Latina the Top 30 girls chosen in the auditions were taken on an international trip by their respective judge. Osmel took his girls to Canada, Lupita took her girls to Mexico and Julian took his girls to Puerto Rico.

== Contestants ==
Final results	Contestants
Winner	El Salvador - Marisela Demontecristo
Runner-Up	Dominican Republic - Audris Rijo
3rd place	Puerto Rico - Viviana Ortiz
4th place	Colombia - Barbara Turbay
5th place	Mexico - Marina Ruiz
6th place	Cuba - Odaray Prats Molina
7th place	Mexico - Barbara Falcon
8th place	Mexico - Zuleyka Silver
9th place	Puerto Rico - Essined Aponte
10th place	Mexico - Karina Hermosillo
11th place	Mexico - Fernanda Loconsolo
12th place	Mexico - Lilia Fifield
Top 18	Colombia - Carolina Betancourth; Cuba - Alina Rodríguez; Cuba - Leticia Laurenti; Dominican Republic - Carlina Durán; Dominican Republic - Johanna Burgos; Puerto Rico - Sharen Vargas
Top 24	Chile - Stephanie Torres; Ecuador - Karina Correa; Mexico - Alejandra Robles; Mexico - Lisa Ruesga; Nicaragua - Marline Barberena; Puerto Rico - Tershya Soto
Top 30	Argentina - Natalia Fensel; Cuba - Sissi Marin; Mexico - Carolina Urrea; Puerto Rico - Carole Rigual; Puerto Rico - Neyra Alvarez; Dominican Republic - Maria Nelly Vicioso

== Elimination table ==
Place	Country	Contestant	Week								
Place	Country	Contestant	3/25 (Ep. 4)	4/1 (Ep. 5)	4/8 (Ep. 6)	4/15 (Ep. 7)	4/22 (Ep. 8)	4/29 (Ep. 9)	5/6 (Semifinal)		5/13 (Final)
1	(El Salvador)	Marisela Demontecristo	SAFE	WIN	BTM2	SAFE	WIN	SAFE	SAFE	SAFE	Winner
2	(Dominican Republic)	Audris Rijo	SAFE	SAFE	WIN	BTM2	SAFE	BTM3	SAFE	BTM2	1st runner-up
3	(Puerto Rico)	Viviana Ortíz	SAFE	SAFE	SAFE	SAFE	SAFE	SAFE	SAFE	SAFE	2nd runner-up
4	(Colombia)	Bárbara Turbay	SAFE	WIN	WIN	BTM3	BTM3	SAFE	SAFE	SAFE	3rd runner-up
5	(Mexico)	Marina Ruíz	SAFE	WIN	BTM3	SAFE	SAFE	BTM2	WIN	SAFE	4th runner-up
6	(Cuba)	Odaray Prats	SAFE	BTM3	SAFE	SAFE	SAFE	SAFE	SAFE	ELIM	
7	(Mexico)	Bárbara Falcón	SAFE	SAFE	SAFE	SAFE	BTM2	WIN	ELIM		
8	(Mexico)	Zuleyka Silver	SAFE	BTM2	SAFE	SAFE	SAFE	ELIM			
9	(Puerto Rico)	Essined Aponte	SAFE	SAFE	SAFE	SAFE	ELIM				
10	(Mexico)	Karina Hermosillo	SAFE	SAFE	SAFE	ELIM					
11	(Mexico)	Fernanda Loconsolo	SAFE	SAFE	ELIM						
12	(Mexico)	Lilia Fifield	SAFE	ELIM							

The contestant won the week's reward challenge.
The contestant was in the bottom three, but was saved by the other contestants.
The contestant was in the bottom two.
The contestant won the week's reward challenge and was eliminated.
The contestant was eliminated.
The contestant won the week's reward challenge and was in the bottom three, but was saved by the other contestants.
The contestant was a finalist, but did not win.
The contestant was the runner-up.
The contestant won Nuestra Belleza Latina 2013.

== Shows ==
2013 Auditions:

Audition	Date
San Juan, Puerto Rico	January 10, 2013
New York City	January 15, 2013
Chicago, Illinois	January 17, 2013
Houston, Texas	January 22, 2013
Phoenix, Arizona	January 24, 2013
San Jose, California	January 29, 2013
Los Angeles, California	January 31, 2013
Miami, Florida	February 4, 2013
Online Auditions	November 19, 2012 - January 23, 2013

== Top 12 Contestants Notes ==
- COL Barbara Turbay won Miss Mundo Colombia 2012 and represented Colombia at Miss World 2012 where she made it to the Top 30.
- DOM Audris Rijo won Miss Turismo Dominicana 2009 representing La Altagracia. She also competed in Reinado Internacional del Café 2010 and placed as 2nd Runner-Up, there she won special awards, Queen of the Water and Best Face. She had also made it to the Top 24 in Nuestra Belleza Latina 2011
- ESA Marisela Demontecristo won Miss Carnaval San Miguel Las Vegas 2012, later won Reinado de El Salvador 2018 which gave her the right to represent El Salvador at Miss Universe 2018 where she was unplaced.
- MEX Barbara Falcon competed in Miss Texas USA 2012 representing Southwest Texas and placed as 3rd Runner Up. She had also won Miss Laredo Texas 2009, Miss Laredo Teen 2005 and was a finalist in Miss Texas Teen USA 2005. She was elected as Nuestra Belleza Tamaulipas 2013 and placed as a semifinalist in Nuestra Belleza México 2013. She compete in Miss Texas USA 2015 and 2016 placing 2nd runner up and 1st runner up before aging out respectively.
- MEX Zuleyka Silver competed in Model Latina 2009 and finished in 3rd place. She is also an actress in Los Angeles and has appeared in numerous films and music videos.
- MEX Lilia Fifield competed in the 3rd cycle of Mexico's Next Top Model and finished in 12th place.
- PRI Essined Aponte had previously competed in Nuestra Belleza Latina 2012 and was voted off in the Top 24.
- PRI Viviana Ortiz won Miss Universe Puerto Rico 2011 and represented Puerto Rico at Miss Universe 2011 where she made it to the Top 16.

== Winners ==
Preceded by Vanessa De Roide	Nuestra Belleza Latina 2013; Marisela Demontecristo	Succeeded by Aleyda Ortiz
