= Nuestra Belleza Latina =

- Genre: Reality; Beauty pageant
- Created by: Marlon Quintero; Mariano Calasso
- Presented by: Giselle Blondet (2007–13); Pedro Moreno (2014); Alejandra Espinoza (2014; 2018); Chiquinquirá Delgado (2014–16); Javier Poza (2015–16); Francisca Lachapel (2016)
- Judges: Osmel Sousa (2007–16); Carlos Calderón (2007); Alicia Machado (2007); Julián Gil (2008; 2010–13); Lupita Jones (2008–14); Jorge Aravena (2009); Jencarlos Canela (2014); Jomari Goyso (2015; 2018); Jacqueline Bracamontes (2015–16); Daniel Arenas (2016); Denise Bidot (2018)
- Country of origin: United States
- Original language: Spanish
- No. of seasons: 11
- No. of episodes: 110

Original release
- Network: Univision
- Release: 27 March 2007 – 21 November 2021

Nuestra Belleza Latina (English: Our Latin beauty) is an American reality television beauty pageant that has been broadcast on Univision from 2007 through 2016, 2018, and 2021. Reunion specials have been conducted in the years 2010, 2016, 2018, and 2020. Nuestra Belleza Latina sees contestants residing in a house together in Miami, Florida, competing in weekly challenges to win the Nuestra Belleza Latina crown. Each week the viewing public votes for their favorites, and one contestant is eliminated. The winner receives a year-long television presenting contract with Univision, among other prizes. Contestants are Hispanic and Latino Americans who are either American citizens or permanent residents.

The current Nuestra Belleza Latina is Sirey Moran from Honduras.

== Format ==
Auditions are held in cities throughout the United States and Puerto Rico for Hispanic and Latino American women. Judges then select anywhere from 12 to 14 finalists to move into the Nuestra Belleza Latina mansion in Miami, Florida, where the contestants reside for the duration of the competition. The finalists receive training in dance, catwalk, speaking, teleprompter reading, and physical fitness, and compete in weekly challenges against each other. Following each episode, the viewing public is allowed to vote for their favorite contestant. The three contestants with the fewest votes are thus put in danger; one is saved by the other contestants, one is saved by the judges, and the third is eliminated from the competition. After a certain number of contestants remain, the audience chooses the winner of the competition. The winner receives various prizes, such as a contract with Univision, a cash prize, and the title of Nuestra Belleza Latina.

== Editions ==
Season	Country	Contestant
2007	Mexico	Alejandra Espinoza
2008	Puerto Rico	Melissa Marty
2009	Cuba	Greidys Gil
2010	Mexico	Ana Patricia González
2011	Nicaragua	Nastassja Bolívar
2012	Puerto Rico	Vanessa De Roide
2013	El Salvador	Marisela Demontecristo
2014	Puerto Rico	Aleyda Ortiz
2015	Dominican Republic	Francisca Lachapel
2016	Dominican Republic	Clarissa Molina
2018	Venezuela	Migbelis Castellanos
2021	Honduras	Sirey Morán

== Judges and hosts ==
=== Judges ===
Judge	Edition										
Judge	2007	2008	2009	2010	2011	2012	2013	2014	2015	2016	2018
Osmel Sousa	Main	Main	Main	Main	Main	Main	Main	Main	Main	Main	
Carlos Calderón	Main										
Alicia Machado	Main										
Julián Gil		Main		Main	Main	Main	Main				
Lupita Jones		Main	Main	Main	Main	Main	Main	Main			
Jorge Aravena			Main								
Jencarlos Canela								Main			
Jomari Goyso									Main		Main
Jacqueline Bracamontes									Main	Main	
Daniel Arenas										Main	
Giselle Blondet											Main
Denise Bidot											Main
El Dasa											Main

=== Hosts ===
Host	Edition										
Host	2007	2008	2009	2010	2011	2012	2013	2014	2015	2016	2018
Giselle Blondet	Main										
Pedro Moreno								Main			
Alejandra Espinoza								Main			Main
Chiquinquirá Delgado								Main			
Javier Poza									Main		
Francisca Lachapel										Main	
