= Nabila Tapia =

Dominican beauty pageant titleholder, model, actress and zumba instructor

- Born: October 6, 1992 (age 34); Santo Domingo, Dominican Republic
- Height: 1.73 m (5 ft 8 in)
- Children: Living Mariet Valerio Tapia
- Beauty pageant titleholder
- Title: Miss Turismo Dominicana 2010; Miss Teen República Dominicana 2010
- Hair color: Black
- Eye color: Brown
- Major competitions: Miss Turismo Dominicana 2010 (Winner); Miss Tourism World 2010; Miss Teen República Dominicana 2010 (Winner); Miss Teen International 2010 (2nd runner-up); Nuestra Belleza Latina 2014 (2nd runner-up)

Nabila Tapia (born October 6, 1992) is a Dominican beauty pageant titleholder, model, actress and zumba instructor. A former Miss Turismo Dominicana, Miss Teen República Dominicana, and placed 3rd (2nd runner-up) in Miss Teen International.

In 2014, Nabila became an international sensation when she became one of the 12 finalists of Nuestra Belleza Latina 2014 where she finished as 2nd runner-up.

== Life ==
Tapia was born on October 6, 1992, in Santo Domingo, Republica Dominicana. Her father died of a brain tumor when she was 6 years old and 8 years later her mother was detected with breast cancer but survived. She has an older brother named Rodney Tapia who also serves as her pageant coach.

== Pageants ==
Prior to participating in Nuestra Belleza Latina, she won several beauty pageants including Miss Turismo Dominicana 2010 and Miss Teen República Dominicana 2009. In November 2010, she represented Dominican Republic at Miss Teen International 2010 held in San Jose, Costa Rica where she placed as 2nd runner-up.

== Nuestra Belleza Latina 2014 ==
Nabila auditioned for Univision's hit reality show and beauty pageant Nuestra Belleza Latina 2014 in New York City on December 8, 2013. She was selected to travel to Miami to audition in front of the show's judges. After several eliminations, she was selected to be part of the 12 finalists who enter the mansion of Nuestra Belleza Latina. During the competition, she won the 50 Mas Bellos challenge and was featured among People en Español magazine's 50 most beautiful people of 2014. After landing in the top 4, Nabila Tapia finished as 2nd runner-up. The eventual winner was Aleyda Ortiz of Puerto Rico.

Awards and achievements
Preceded by (Puerto Rico) Viviana Ortiz	Nuestra Belleza Latina 2nd runner-up 2014	Succeeded by (Puerto Rico) Catherine Castro
Preceded by Audris Rijo	Miss Turismo Dominicana; 2010	Succeeded by Laura Báez
