= Bidot =

Bidot is a surname, likely of French origin. Notable people with the surname include:

- Denise Bidot (born 1986), American plus-sized fashion model
- Jean Bidot (1905–1986), French professional cyclist
- Marcel Bidot (1902–1995), French professional road bicycle racer
