= Reinado Internacional del Café 2010 =

Beauty pageant edition

Reinado Internacional del Café 2010, was held in Manizales, Colombia, on January 9, 2010. 19 contestants attended the event. The winner was Mariana Notarangelo, from Brazil.

== Results ==
=== Placements ===
| Final results | Contestant |
|---|---|
| Reina Internacional del Café 2010 | Brazil - Mariana Notarangelo |
| Virreina Internacional del Café 2010 | Poland - Iwona Wyrzykowska |
| 1st Runner Up | Bolivia - Flavia Foianini |
| 2nd Runner Up | Dominican Republic - Audris Rijo |
| 3rd Runner Up | Venezuela - Elizabeth Mosquera |

=== Special awards ===
- Queen of Water: Dominican Republic Audris Rijo
- Finalists: Bolivia, Poland
- Queen of Police: Brazil
- Finalists: Bolivia, Spain, United States, Venezuela
- Best Face: Dominican Republic Audris Rijo
- Best Hair: United States

== Official delegates ==
| ! País | Candidatas | Año | Estatura (cm) | Medidas (ft) | Ciudad |
|---|---|---|---|---|---|
| Argentina | Yanina Ruiz | 24 | 175 | 5'9" | Morón |
| Bahamas | Nikie Severe | 26 | 170 | 5'7" | Freeport |
| Bolivia | Flavia Foianini | 20 | 176 | 5'9.5" | Santa Cruz |
| Brazil | Mariana Notarangelo | 23 | 175 | 5'9" | Rio de Janeiro |
| Canada | Mariana Valente | 24 | 175 | 5'9" | Toronto |
| Colombia | Alejandra Tovar | 23 | 170 | 5'7" | Neiva |
| Costa Rica | Angie Alfaro | 18 | 174 | 5'8.5" | Alajuela |
| Dominican Republic | Audris Rijo | 24 | 170 | 5'7" | Santo Domingo |
| El Salvador | Michelle Bustamante | 19 | 175 | 5'9" | La Libertad |
| Guatemala | Jessana Paté | 22 | 177 | 5'9.5" | Guatemala City |
| Honduras | Blaise Masey | 20 | 173 | 5'8" | San Pedro Sula |
| Paraguay | Viviana Benítez | 24 | 172 | 5'7.5" | San Juan Bautista |
| Peru | Danissa Zurek | 19 | 173 | 5'8" | Lima |
| Poland | Iwona Wyrzykowska | 19 | 171 | 5'7.5" | Łódź |
| Puerto Rico | Yerlyn Rodríguez | 23 | 178 | 5'10" | Mayagüez |
| Spain | Ara Jurado Calero | 21 | 181 | 6'0" | Peñarroya |
| United States | Amanda Delgado | 20 | 176 | 5'9.5" | Upland |
| Uruguay | Cinthia Furtado | 26 | 172 | 5'7.5" | Durazno |
| Venezuela | Elizabeth Mosquera | 18 | 177 | 5'9.5" | Valera |

== Trivia ==
- Elizabeth Mosquera (Venezuela) won Miss International 2010.
- Flavia Foianini (Bolivia) competed in Reina Hispanoamericana 2009 and Miss World 2009.
- Mariana Valente (Canadá) competed in Miss Universe 2009 and Miss Continente Americano 2009.
- Angie Alfaro (Costa Rica) and Blaise Masey (Honduras) competed in Miss World 2009.
- Viviana Benítez (Paraguay) competed in Miss Globe International 2009.
- Amanda Delgado (United States) competed in Miss Tourism Queen International 2008.
- Audris Rijo (Dominican Republic) Won Miss Turismo Dominicano 2009 competed in Nuestra Belleza Latina 2013 placing as 1st runner up.
