= Nuestra Belleza Latina 2018 =

- Season 11
- Presented by: Alejandra Espinoza
- Judges: Jomari Goyso; Giselle Blondet; Denise Bidot; El Dasa
- Winner: Migbelis Castellanos
- Runner-up: Yaritza Owen
- No. of episodes: 11

Release
- Original network: Univision
- Original release: September 23 – December 2, 2018

Season chronology
- ← Previous; Nuestra Belleza Latina 2016

Nuestra Belleza Latina 2018 is the eleventh season of Nuestra Belleza Latina, which premiered on September 23, 2018. In February 2017, the program was put on hiatus after ten seasons of broadcasting. However, in May 2018, it was announced that the program would return the following September. This would be the first season in the history of the show to premiere during the fall, as the previous ten all took place during the springtime. Several changes were implemented in the format such as removing the age and weight limit requirements as seen before. Migbelis Castellanos would be crowned the winner of this season on December 2, 2018.

== Results ==
Position	Contestant
Winner	Venezuela – Migbelis Castellanos
2nd Place	Honduras – Yaritza Owen
3rd Place	Dominican Republic – Ceylin Rosario
4th Place	Mexico – Nancy Alejandre
5th Place	Cuba – Massiel Mantilla
6th Place	Venezuela – Andrea González
7th Place	Mexico – Vanessa Romo
8th Place	Colombia – Arana Lemus
9th Place	Cuba – Sheila Laza
10th Place	Mexico – Elvira Reyes
11th Place	Puerto Rico – Carmen Batiz
12th Place	Panama – Brenda Smith
13th Place	Mexico – Andrea Bazarte
14th Place	Puerto Rico – Nobiraida Infante
Top 20	Dominican Republic – Eví Siskos; Dominican Republic – Jessica Castillo; Mexico – Lizzy Arredondo; Puerto Rico – Desire Ortiz; Puerto Rico – Laurie Simpson; Puerto Rico – Leslie Oquendo
