= Josephine Ochoa =

American model and businesswoman (born 1992)

- Born: Josephine Jasmine Ochoa; December 8, 1992 (age 33); Los Angeles, California
- Occupations: American social influencer, spokesmodel, creative director, founder of non-profit organization mision guatemala
- Height: 5 ft 6 in (168 cm)
- Title: Miss Guatemala US 2014 (Winner); Nuestra Belleza Latina 2014 (2nd Place); Nuestra Belleza Latina 2016 (7th Place)
- Website: jossieochoa.com

Josephine Jasmine Ochoa (born December 8, 1992) is an American model and businesswoman. She appeared on fashion and beauty platforms such as Univision Network's Nuestra Belleza Latina, L.A Fashion Week, LA Swim Week, Miami Fashion Week and Mercedes-Benz Fashion Week in Central America. She was crowned the Miss of Guatemala in 2014 and became the organization's Creative director in 2015.

Ochoa is the founder of the non-profit organization Mission Guatemala, which helps children with low resources in Guatemala by collecting donations for school supplies, hygiene products and food.

== Early life ==
Ochoa was born on December 8, 1992, in Los Angeles, California, United States to immigrant parents. She is of Guatemalan descent. Her father works as a painter for the contemporary artist Retna. She saw modelling as an avenue to take her family out of poverty and competed in the regional competition for Miss Guatemala US before winning the crown.

== Career ==
She was invited to Central America's Mercedes-Benz Fashion Week, where she walked for several designers and represented Los Angeles. Ochoa was the first Guatemalan figure to appear at Fenway Park Stadium as a special guest of El Mundo Media and local community organization, Casa Guatemala, at the Xfinity Latino Family Festival. Ochoa has worn many couture pieces, including, Walter Mendez, Alejandro Fajardo, Giovanni Scutaro, Willfredo Gerardo and Glaudi Johana. The artist Retna was inspired by Ochoa and her work with such organizations as Beautify Earth and named her muse, creating urban billboard artwork in her likeness. The artwork can be seen in West Hollywood (Sunset and San Vicente).

Ochoa has been featured in such published work like Univision, Belleza y Moda, Primer Impacto, Iconos Magazine, El Mundo Boston, Soy502.com, To the Point Magazine, People en Espanol, TV y Notas, La Prensa, Nuestro Diario, and Adelante Magazine.

=== Nuestra Belleza Latina 2014 ===
Ochoa competed in Miss Guatemala US 2013 and won the title. After winning Miss Guatemala US 2013, she competed in Univision's Nuestra Belleza Latina (Our Latin Beauty). Ochoa was the first runner-up, and won the title "Fan Fave".

Ochoa's mother voiced her opinion about the network's apparent disregard for the voting polls. "I’m talking legally, this is pure cheating", she said. Ochoa told Huffington Post Voces that she was happy for Aleyda Ortiz NBL 2014 Winner. "You hear everything here: yes, many expected me to be the winner, but Aleyda also had her fans, and the public voted. I am very glad that people can imagine a crown on my head, it means I did a good job," she said.

=== Nuestra Belleza Latina 2016 ===
Ochoa was chosen by the producers to compete in the first "All-Star" season of Nuestra Belleza Latina. The Nuestra Belleza Latina 2016 season premiered on February 28, 2016, and after several elimination rounds, she made it to the Top 12 girls and entered the Mansion of Beauty. On May 1, 2016, Ochoa was eliminated from the competition for not receiving enough votes to continue in NBL VIP and finished in 7th place.

== Humanitarian work ==
Ochoa hosted Heroinas de Hoy, an award show that recognizes women doing good work for the Latin community. In response to her passionate advocacy for raising awareness for children affected by cancer, the Junior Foundation awarded Ochoa accolades for the children whose lives have been made better by her advocacy work. For speaking on issues affecting the Central American immigrant community, Ochoa received special recognition from the Consulate-General of Guatemala in Los Angeles. From conducting toy drives for underprivileged children and participating with non-profits, the Senate of California, awarded Ochoa special recognition, thanking her for her avid altruistic work.

In 2015, Josephine founded a project called Misión Guatemala to help underprivileged children in Guatemala. Their mission is to raise donations and provide assistance to children by donating school supplies, food and hygiene kits to the villages within the country.

Awards and achievements
Preceded by (Dominican Republic) Audris Rijo	Nuestra Belleza Latina 2nd Place; 2014	Succeeded by (Honduras) Nathalia Casco

Preceded by (Mexico) Cynthia Pérez	Nuestra Belleza Latina 7th Place; 2016	Succeeded by TBA
