= Zoila Ceballos =

- Born: Santo Domingo, Dominican Republic
- Beauty pageant titleholder
- Hair color: Blonde
- Eye color: Brown
- Major competitions: Nuestra Belleza Latina 2008 (4th Place); Nuestra Belleza Latina 2016 (9th place)

Zoila Ceballos is a Dominican beauty pageant titleholder, professional model, and actress. She represented her country at Nuestra Belleza Latina.

In 2008, Ceballos became one of the 12 finalists of Nuestra Belleza Latina 2008 where she finished as 4th runner-up.

In 2016, Zoila give it another chance in Nuestra Belleza Latina 2016. She later became one of the 12 finalists in Nuestra Belleza Latina 2016. Despite being a favorite, She finished in 9th Place.

== Career ==
Ceballos has worked with several companies, and has performed in TV shows Don Francisco, movies and video clips with Pitbull, Don Omar and others.

After Nuestra Belleza Latina Ceballos moved to Miami, Florida to take some acting classes. Zoila had appeared in a novela Marido en Alquiler for Telemundo. Ceballos also had worked on Mortales la Serie a Hispanic television series.

== Nuestra Belleza Latina 2008 ==
Ceballos auditioned in New York to participate in the second year of Nuestra Belleza Latina. Ceballos then was chosen to travel to Miami and see if she could win the PASS to enter the mansion. In 2008 she became the 4th runner up of Nuestra Belleza Latina 2008.

=== NBL VIP "All★Star"- Nuestra Belleza Latina 2016 ===
Zoila has been chosen by producers to compete in the first ever "All★Star" season of Nuestra Belleza Latina. The season of Nuestra Belleza Latina 2016 premiered on Sunday February 28, 2016 where 25 girls from past seasons were selected to compete. After several elimination rounds she made it to the Top 12 girls, but on Sunday April 17, 2016 she was eliminated for not receiving enough votes to stay in the competition leaving her in 9th place.

== Movies/Videos ==
Zoila Ceballos featured in several videos and movies:

- Lotto man 2
- Maestra Barraza
- Rey Ungria the game
- El Pelotudo
- Dark Dreams by Wilton Reynoso
- Donde Quieras Que Vallas by Eduardo Luna
- La fiesta ya empezó by Yalitza Lora
- Don't Stop the Party by Pittbull
- El Amor De Mi Vida by Anthony Mana
- I Swing Merengue Tipico
- Hasta Abajo by Don Omar

== Awards ==
She received the Actress of the Year Award and Gruperos Latinos Show Awards 2014.

Awards and achievements
| Preceded by (Cuba) Elizabeth López | Nuestra Belleza Latina 4th Place; 2008 | Succeeded by (Mexico) Monica De Leon |

| Preceded by (Mexico) Bridget Ruiz | Nuestra Belleza Latina 9th Place; 2016 | Succeeded by TBA |
