= Susie De Los Santos =

American model and DJ (born 1988)

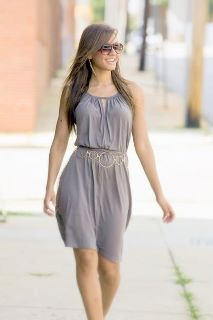
- Born: November 6, 1988 (age 37); Queens, New York, U.S.
- Beauty pageant titleholder
- Hair color: Brown
- Eye color: Brown
- Major competitions: Nuestra Belleza Latina 2009 (10th Place); Nuestra Belleza Latina 2016 (Top 20)

Susie De Los Santos (born November 6, 1988) is an American model and DJ of Dominican and Mexican descent. De Los Santos is from Corona, Queens, New York. She later began a career in modeling.

== Achievements ==
In 2007, De Los Santos won the Miss North Carolina Hawaiian Tropic pageant and went on to compete in the United States Miss Hawaiian Tropic finals in Hawaii. Later that year, she hosted a weekly entertainment segment for North Carolina's Univision 40 called Muévete Carolina. She also auditioned for America's Next Top Model and did not even make it to the top house.

In December 2009, De Los Santos won Miss Dominican Republic for Fox Sports en Español's Premios Fox Sports out of over 50 contestants nationwide. She has done promotions for Eurosport, Compare Foods and Wendy's. In 2010, De Los Santos won Model Of The Year in the Carolina Music Awards. Later that year, she won a national model search featured on Telefutura's Escandalo TV "Buscando la Modelo del Chapo de Sinaloa." In 2011 she appeared alongside El Chapo de Sinaloa as the lead model in his music video, "Embrujado."

In 2010 De Los Santos won model of the year in the Carolina Music Awards.

== Nuestra Belleza Latina ==
=== Nuestra Belleza Latina 2009 ===
In 2009, De Los Santos auditioned for Univision's Nuestra Belleza Latina. Out of thousands of models, she was selected as a finalist and to date she is the only girl from North Carolina to have made it to the top 12. She was on the show for two months before she was eliminated. Susie gained international exposure and some degree of fame through her participation. Susie has been interviewed on various occasions on Univision shows including, Don Francisco Presenta, Despierta America and El Gordo y La Flaca.

=== NBL VIP "All★Star"- Nuestra Belleza Latina 2016 ===
Susie De Los Santos has been chosen by producers to compete in the first ever "All★Star" season of Nuestra Belleza Latina, The season of Nuestra Belleza Latina 2016 will premiere on Sunday February 28, 2016. Susie was eliminated from the competition on 3/13/16 as the judge Osmel Souza said that her performance was worse than when she first auditioned in 2009

== Personal life ==
Susie is the owner of her own beauty pageant and magazine called Nuestra Belleza Carolina and is C.E.O. of DLS Premiere. She is part owner of Susie Taxi, a taxicab company in Durham, North Carolina.

Susie is signed to Elite Miami.

Susie De Los Santos dated music producer A.B. Quintanilla III, brother of Selena Quintanilla and creator of Los Kumbia Kings and Los Kumbia All Starz, in 2013. They remain good friends after their relationship ended and on August 2, 2017, Susie De Los Santos defended and spoke positively about A.B. Quintanilla during his 2017 court case against an ex-romantic partner of his, saying "We are very, very good friends" and "He'll take care of it" in regard to his court case.
