= Gredmarie Colón =

Puerto Rican model, actress, reporter and radio host (born 1988)

Gredmarie Colón Jiménez
- Born: October 7, 1988 (age 36); Cayey, Puerto Rico
- Occupations: Model; actress; reporter; TV host
- Years active: 2010–present
- Spouse: Raúl Alexis Ortiz Rolón (m. 2006; div. 2016)
- Children: 1

Gredmarie Colón Jiménez (born October 7, 1988) is a Puerto Rican model, actress, reporter and TV host.

== Career ==
She was the first runner-up of the beauty pageant and reality show Nuestra Belleza Latina 2011. She formerly appeared as a TV reporter and presenter on the Univision morning show Tu Mañana and was the host of La Hora del Chavo.

Colón appeared as the social media ambassador and co-host of the TV program Rubén & Co., alongside Rubén Sánchez and Daniela Droz. She was the presenter on the program Lo sé Todo in Wapa Puerto Rico. Colón has returned to acting, with her latest credit being in "Los Mecanicos", released in January 2023.

== Personal life ==
Colón announced her pregnancy in mid-2015, giving birth to daughter Kamilia Thompson Colón that same year.

Awards and achievements
Preceded by (Colombia) Carolina Ramirez	Nuestra Belleza Latina 1st Runner-Up; 2011	Succeeded by (Mexico) Setareh Khatibi
