= Miss Nicaragua 2013 =

- Date: March 2, 2013
- Presenters: Ivan Taylor; Valeria Sanchez
- Venue: Teatro Nacional Rubén Darío, Managua, Nicaragua
- Broadcaster: VosTv
- Entrants: 14
- Winner: Nastassja Bolívar; Diriamba

The Miss Nicaragua 2013 pageant was held on March 2, 2013, in Managua, after weeks of events. At the conclusion of the final night of competition. The winner represented Nicaragua at Miss Universe 2013

== Results ==
=== Placements ===
Placement	Contestant
Miss Nicaragua 2013	Diriamba – Nastassja Bolívar
Miss Nicaragua World 2013	Nueva Segovia – Luz Mery Decena
Miss Nicaragua International 2013	Tipitapa – Celeste Castillo
Top 6	Managua – Luviana Torres; Granada – Daysi Largaespada; Ciudad Sandino – Cristina Soto

== Special awards ==
- Most Beautiful Face – Carazo – Nastassja Bolívar
- Miss Congeniality – Chinandega – Katherine Molina
- Miss Photogenic – Rivas – Karla Corea
- Best Smile – Carazo – Nastassja Bolívar
- Best Hair – Managua – Luviana Torres
- Miss Fitness – Tipitapa – Celeste Castillo
- Miss Popularity – Chinandega – Katherine Molina (by Text votes of CLARO Telecom company)

== Official contestants ==
State	Contestant
Bluefields	Jotishema Fox
Diriamba	Nastassja Bolívar
Chinandega	Katherine Molina
Chontales	Cristian Fajardo
Ciudad Sandino	Cristina Soto
Carazo	Sara Tapia
Granada	Daysi Largaespada
La Libertad	Ana Yanzy Toledo
Managua	Luviana Torres
Masaya	Dayanna Méndez
Nueva Segovia	Luz Mery Decena
Rivas	Karla Corea
Tipitapa	Celeste Castillo
Villanueva	Ariadna Orellana

== Judges ==
- Juan Brenes – Professional Hair Stylist
- Mariu E. Lacayo – Professional Image Consultant & Owner of Ponte Vecchio Boutique
- Adriana Dorn – Miss Nicaragua 2011
- Miguel Arrieta – Executive Director of Grupo Q Nicaragua
- Jorge Pivaral – Regional Manager of Procter & Gamble Co.
- Francina Navas Debayle – Operations Manager of Nica A Mano S.A

.

== Background music ==
- Opening Show – Luis Pastor Gonzalez – "Nicarafricanico"
- Swimsuit Competition – Kat DeLuna – "Run the Show" & "Whine up"
- Evening Gown Competition – Avicii – Silhouettes
