= Audris Rijo =

Dominican Republic model

- Born: Audris Marlenys Rijo; April 8, 1985 (age 41); Santo Domingo, Dominican Republic
- Height: 1.73 m (5 ft 8 in)
- Beauty pageant titleholder
- Title: Miss Turismo Dominicana; Reinado Internacional del Café 2010
- Hair color: Black
- Eye color: Brown
- Major competitions: Miss Turismo Dominicana 2009 (Winner); Reinado Internacional del Café 2010 (2nd Runner Up); Nuestra Belleza Latina 2013 (1st Runner Up)

Audris Rijo (born April 8, 1985) is a Dominican beauty pageant titleholder, professional model, actress, presenter and journalist. She represented her country at Miss Turismo Dominicana, Reinado Internacional del Café, and Nuestra Belleza Latina.

In 2013, Rijo became first runner-up of Nuestra Belleza Latina 2013. In 2015 she became the host of entertainment for Telemundo 47 New York. She also was the host of the morning show Acceso Total Nueva York.

== Career ==
In 2009, Rijo won the national title of Miss Dominican Tourism 2009, as well as the Miss Elegance and Miss Culture titles."Audris Rijo es la nueva Miss Turismo Dominicana 2009". Diario Libre.

In 2010, Rijo represented the Dominican Republic at the International Queen of Coffee pageant in Manizales, Colombia, where she won the titles of Queen of the Waters and Perfect Face. She also won the Queen of the Americas title in Guatemala City, Guatemala.

Rijo has also worked in fashion design. In 2014, she launched a children’s swimwear line called “Kisses Audris Rijo by DM”, created in collaboration with designer Diany Mota. The brand was officially presented on June 8, 2014, during Kids Fashion Week NY, where Rijo participated in the runway presentation.

Rijo currently works for Telemundo 47 New York, where she is a host of ‘‘Acceso Total Nueva York’’.

== Nuestra Belleza Latina 2013 ==
In 2011, Audris auditioned for Univision’s reality show, Nuestra Belleza Latina. However, she took time off from her career to focus on other personal interests. Rijo returned to her career in 2013 and was first runner-up on Nuestra Belleza Latina. During the competition, she won the 50 Mas Bellos challenge and was featured among People en Español magazine's "50 most beautiful people of 2014". The eventual winner was Marisela Demontecristo of El Salvador. Since participating in Univision contract, Rijo has worked as a reporter for Univision and was a presenter on Premios Juventud. She also appeared on People en Español. She has made appearances on ¡Despierta América!, El Gordo y la Flaca, and Don Francisco.

=== NBL VIP "All★Star"- Nuestra Belleza Latina 2016 ===
Audris has been chosen by the fans to compete in the first ever "All★Star" season of Nuestra Belleza Latina, The season of Nuestra Belleza Latina 2016 will premiere on Sunday February 28, 2015, but on March 6, 2016, she was eliminated because she did not receive enough votes to continue in the competition.

== Magazine/newspaper covers ==
- Mujer Unica
- El Especialito
- Universal
- L'Estilo
- Eventos
- El Mundo del ShowBiz
- Metro.pr
- People en Español
- Latin Show
- All the Picture

== Awards ==
She received the Model of the Year Award and Gruperos Latinos Show Awards 2014.

She was presented with a Dominican of the Year award by Senator Adriano Espaillat of the United States Senate.

Awards and achievements
Preceded by (Mexico) Setareh Khatibi	Nuestra Belleza Latina 1st Runner Up; 2013	Succeeded by (Guatemala) Josephine Ochoa
Preceded by Victoria de Jesús Fernández Tavez	Reinado Internacional del Café 2nd Runner-Up; 2010	Succeeded by Ana Isabel Miranda Socorro
Preceded by Keiry Calderón Herrera	Miss Turismo Dominicano; 2009	Succeeded by Nabila Tapia
