= Viviana Ortiz =

Puerto Rican actress, model, & beauty pageant titleholder (born 1986)

Viviana Ortiz Pastrana
- Born: Viviana Ortiz Pastrana; September 12, 1986 (age 40); Corozal, Puerto Rico
- Education: Universidad del Sagrado Corazón (BA)
- Occupations: Actress; model
- Height: 1.76 m (5 ft 9 1/2 in)
- Spouse: J. J. Barea (m. 2016)
- Children: 2
- Beauty pageant titleholder
- Title: Miss Corozal Universe 2011; Miss Universe Puerto Rico 2011
- Hair color: Brown
- Eye color: Brown
- Major competitions: Miss Universe Puerto Rico 2011 (Winner) (Payless Best Catwalk) (JCPenney Best Style) (Buscando La Más Bella Week 2 Winner); Miss Universe 2011 (Top 16); Nuestra Belleza Latina 2013 (3rd place)

Viviana Ortiz Pastrana (born September 12, 1986) is a Puerto Rican actress, model and beauty pageant titleholder who was crowned Miss Universe Puerto Rico 2011 on November 4, 2010 and represented Puerto Rico at Miss Universe 2011 where she placed in the Top 16.

== Early life ==
Ortiz was born in Corozal, Puerto Rico to Héctor Ortiz and Mercedes Pastrana. She is the middle child, and has an older sister and a younger brother.

She earned a bachelor's degree in telecommunications from the Sacred Heart University of Puerto Rico, graduating magna cum laude.

== Miss Universe Puerto Rico ==
Ortiz, who stands 1.77 m (5 ft 9 1/2 in) tall, competed as Miss Corozal in Miss Universe Puerto Rico 2011, held in San Juan, where she won the Payless Best Catwalk award, the JCPenney Best Style award, and the title of Miss Universe Puerto Rico. She competed in the 2011 Miss Universe pageant in São Paulo, Brazil on September 12, 2011, her 25th birthday, where she finished in the Top 16.

== Nuestra Belleza Latina ==
Viviana competed in Univision's Nuestra Belleza Latina 2013 representing Puerto Rico and was part of Lupita Jones' team. After weeks of intense competition and challenges she made it to the top 5. She finished in third place and was awarded a scholarship to study acting at Televisa's Centro de Educacion Artistica (CEA) in Mexico.

== Personal life ==
Since 2013, Viviana has been in a relationship with Puerto Rican NBA player, José Juan Barea. Viviana gave birth to their daughter, Paulina Barea Ortiz, on March 30, 2016. Ortiz and Barea got married on August 20, 2016 in a lavish ceremony at the church of the Universidad del Sagrado Corazón in San Juan, Puerto Rico.

Awards and achievements
Preceded by (Venezuela) Karol Scott-Tracy	Nuestra Belleza Latina 2nd Runner-Up; 2013	Succeeded by (Dominican Republic) Nabila Tapia
Preceded by Mariana Vicente (Río Grande)	Miss Universe Puerto Rico; 2011	Succeeded by Bodine Koehler (Río Grande)
Preceded by Melany Rivera	Miss Corozal Universe; 2011	Succeeded by María Nelly Vicioso
