= Elizabeth Mosquera =

Venezuelan model and beauty queen (born 1991)

- Born: Ana Elizabeth Mosquera Gómez; March 16, 1991 (age 35); Maracaibo, Venezuela
- Other name: Elizabeth Mosquera
- Height: 1.77 m (5 ft 9 1/2 in)
- Beauty pageant titleholder
- Title: Miss Trujillo 2009; Miss Venezuela International 2009; Miss International 2010
- Hair color: Brown
- Eye color: Brown
- Major competitions: Miss Venezuela 2009; (Miss Venezuela International); Reinado Internacional del Café 2010; (3rd Runner-up); Miss International 2010; (Winner)

Ana Elizabeth Mosquera Gómez (born March 16, 1991) is a Venezuelan model and beauty queen who was crowned Miss International 2010, becoming the sixth woman from her country to capture the Miss International title. She is also considered the first Afro-Venezuelan woman to win a Grand Slam beauty title for Venezuela.

== Early life ==
Born in Maracaibo, Zulia, Mosquera grew up in Cabimas, with 3 brothers and one sister and was studying civil engineering at the University of Zulia in Maracaibo prior to her participation in Miss Venezuela 2009.

== Pageants ==
=== Miss Venezuela International ===
Mosquera, who stands 1.77 m (5 ft 9 1/2 in) tall, competed in 2009 as Miss Trujillo in her country's national beauty pageant, Miss Venezuela, obtaining the title of Miss Venezuela International on September 24, 2009.

=== International Queen of Coffee ===
Prior to her participation in Miss International, Mosquera represented Venezuela at Reinado Internacional del Café 2010, held in Manizales, Colombia on January 9, 2010, and placed fifth.

=== Miss International 2010 ===
As the official representative of her country to the 2010 Miss International pageant held in Chengdu, China on November 7, 2010, Mosquera competed against 69 other delegates and was crowned the eventual winner of the title, becoming the sixth woman from Venezuela to capture the Miss International crown in 50 years of history. She had a homage in Super Sabado Sensacional on Venevisión (Venezuela's main TV network). She appears on television in Venezuela and she works with children, humanitarian and charity of the Cisneros Foundation.

Awards and achievements
Preceded by (Mexico) Anagabriela Espinoza	Miss International; 2010	Succeeded by (Ecuador) Fernanda Cornejo
Preceded by (Monagas) Laksmi Rodríguez	Miss Venezuela International; 2009	Succeeded by (Caracas) Jessica Barboza
Preceded by Stefanía Fernández	Miss Trujillo; 2009	Succeeded by Jéssica Ibarra
