= Nuestra Belleza Latina 2014 =

American television series

- Season 8
- Presented by: Chiquinquira Delgado; Alejandra Espinoza; Pedro Moreno
- Judges: Osmel Sousa; Lupita Jones; Jencarlos Canela
- Winner: Aleyda Ortiz
- Runner-up: Josephine Ochoa
- No. of episodes: 13

Release
- Original network: Univision
- Original release: February 16 – May 18, 2014

Season chronology
- ← Previous; Nuestra Belleza Latina 2013 Next → Nuestra Belleza Latina 2015

Nuestra Belleza Latina 2014 is the eighth season of Nuestra Belleza Latina. The season premiered on Univision on February 16, 2014. The season finale was on Sunday, May 18, 2014.

The auditions will be shown Sundays, prior to the final 12 are revealed. Auditions were held from December 2013 through January 2014 in five major US cities (Miami, Florida; Chicago, Illinois; New York City, New York; San Antonio, Texas; Los Angeles, California) and in San Juan, Puerto Rico with also Online Castings available. During the audition process, 60 young women were given passes to the semi-finals in Miami. Two contestants were chosen from online Auditions, with the help of public votes.

The winner of the contest will be awarded a contract to be one of the new personality faces on many of Univision's programs and award shows and a chance to win $200,000 in cash and prizes; a prize reduction from previous four seasons and back to its original format. In addition, she will appear on the cover of Cosmopolitan en Español magazine. She will also be a host for Sabado Gigante and reign as Nuestra Belleza Latina for 2014.

The winner of Nuestra Belleza Latina 2014 is Aleyda Ortiz from Puerto Rico.

== 2014 Judges ==
Judges	Occupation	Judging Years
Osmel Sousa	President of the Miss Venezuela Organization	2007 - Present
Lupita Jones	Former Miss Universe and President of Nuestra Belleza México	2008 - Present
Jencarlos Canela	Filmography Pasión Prohibida	2014

== 2014 contestants ==
Final results	Contestant
Winner	Puerto Rico - Aleyda Ortiz
2nd Place	Guatemala - Josephine Ochoa
3rd Place	Dominican Republic - Nabila Tapia
4th Place	Mexico - Aly Villegas
5th Place	Cuba - Alina Robert
6th Place	Mexico - Maria Elena Anaya
7th Place	Mexico - Prissila Sanchez
8th Place	Venezuela - Gabriela Alvarez
9th Place	Colombia - Valeria Moreno
10th Place	Mexico - Yesenia Hernandez
11th Place	Mexico - Maria E. Delgado
12th Place	Mexico - Carolina Verdura

== Contestant Chart ==
Top 12	Winner	1st Runner-Up

Safe	Won the challenge of the week	Bottom 3	Bottom 2	Eliminated	Won the challenge of the week / Eliminated

Stage:		Finalist										Finale
Week:		1	2	3	4	5	6	7	8	9	10	11
Place	Candidate	Results										
1	Aleyda Ortiz	Safe	Safe	Safe	Safe	Safe	Safe	Safe	Bottom 3	Bottom 2	Bottom 2	Winner
2	Josephine Ochoa	Safe	Bottom 2	Bottom 3	Safe	Safe	Safe	Safe	Safe	Safe	Safe	Runner-Up
3	Nabila Tapia	Safe	Safe	Bottom 2	Safe	Safe	Safe	Bottom 3	Safe	Safe	Safe	3rd Place
4	Aly Villegas	Safe	Safe	Safe	Bottom 3	Safe	Bottom 2	Safe	Bottom 2	Bottom 3	Safe	4th Place
5	Alina Robert	Safe	Safe	Safe	Safe	Safe	Safe	Safe	Bottom 2	Safe	5th Place	
6	Maria Elena Anaya	Safe	Safe	Safe	Safe	Safe	Safe	Bottom 2	Safe	6th Place		
7	Prissila Sanchez	Safe	Safe	Safe	Safe	Bottom 2	Bottom 3	7th Place				
8	Gabriela Alvarez	Safe	Safe	Safe	Safe	Bottom 3	8th Place					
9	Valeria Moreno	Safe	Safe	Safe	Bottom 2	9th Place						
10	Yesenia Hernandez	Safe	Safe	Safe	10th Place							
11	Maria E. Delgado	Safe	Bottom 3	11th Place								
12	Carolina Verdura	Safe	12th Place									

== Top 12 Contestants Notes ==
- CUB Alina Robert has won several beauty pageants including Miss Latinoamérica 2012 representing Cuba, Miss Cuban American 2012 and Reina Mundial de los Carnavales 2012. She also represented Cuba at Miss Caribbean World 2012 where she finished as 3rd runner up. She also made it to the Top 18 in Nuestra Belleza Latina 2013.
- DOM Nabila Tapia won Miss Turismo Dominicana 2010 and Miss Teen Dominican Republic 2009. She represented Dominican Republic at Miss Teen International 2010 where she finished as 2nd runner up.
- GUA Josephine Ochoa won Miss Guatemala U.S. 2013.
- MEX Aly Villegas worked as an entertainment news reporter and TV host of the show "La Aficcion" in Mexico.
- MEX Maria Delgado made it to the Top 75 in Nuestra Belleza Latina 2013.
- MEX Maria Elena Anaya was a finalist in Univision's Miss Republica Deportiva 2010. She also made it to the Top 20 in Nuestra Belleza Latina 2009.
- MEX Prissila Sanchez is a well-known TV host and weather reporter at channel Info 7 on the Azteca network.
- MEX /PRI Yesenia Hernandez won Miss HispanoAmerica Illinois 2012.
- PRI Aleyda Ortiz was 1st runner up at Miss Universe Puerto Rico 2014 and represented Puerto Rico at Miss Intercontinental 2013 where she won Best in Swimwear and Best Smile. She made it to the Top 5 and finished as 1st runner up.
- VEN Gabriela Alvarez won Chica Venezuela USA 2006.

== Winners ==
Preceded by Marisela Demontecristo	Nuestra Belleza Latina 2014; Aleyda Ortiz	Succeeded by Francisca Lachapel

== Sources ==
- https://web.archive.org/web/20100317141801/http://foro.univision.com/univision/board?board.id=bellezalatina
- http://video.aol.fr/video-detail/nuestra-belleza-latina-2010/784361480/?icid=VIDURV12
- http://network.nshp.org/events/nuestra-belleza-latina-2010-1
- https://web.archive.org/web/20110218104928/http://mipagina.univision.com/nuestrabelleza
- http://foro.univision.com/t5/Nuestra-Belleza-Latina/MIREN-NUESTRA-BELLEZA-LATINA-2011/m-p/389909861
