= Marisela de Montecristo =

Salvadorian beauty pageant winner

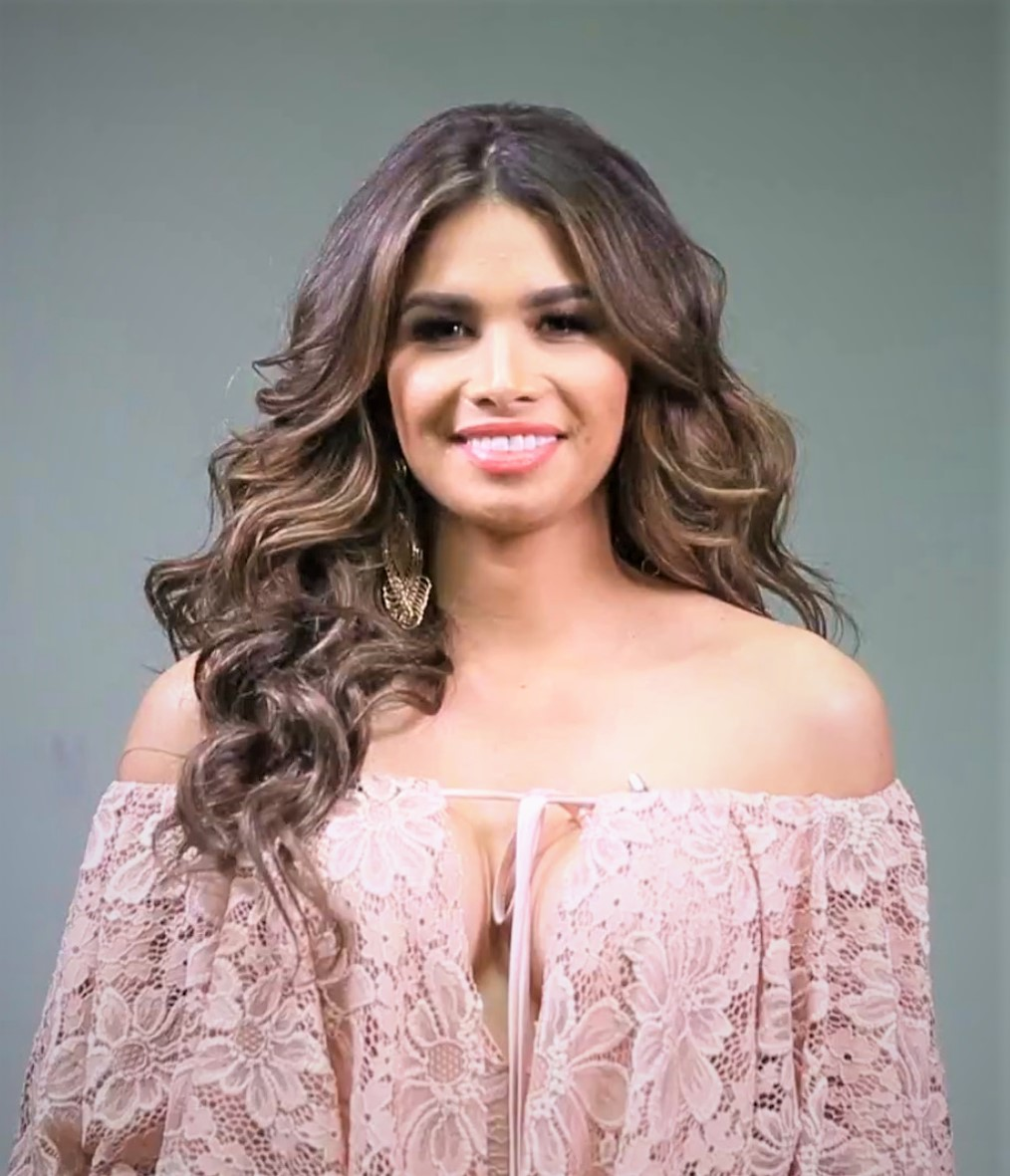
- de Montecristo for La Prensa Gráfica in 2018
- Born: 25 August 1992 (age 34); Olocuilta, El Salvador
- Occupations: Model; television presenter; actress; beauty pageant titleholder
- Height: 1.76 m (5 ft 9 1/2 in)
- Beauty pageant titleholder
- Title: Nuestra Belleza Latina 2013; Miss El Salvador 2018
- Hair color: Brown
- Eye color: Brown
- Major competitions: Nuestra Belleza Latina 2013 (Winner); Miss El Salvador 2018 (Winner); Miss Universe 2018 (Unplaced)

Marisela de Montecristo (born 25 August 1992) is a Salvadoran-American model, television presenter, actress, and beauty pageant titleholder who has been crowned Nuestra Belleza Latina 2013 and Miss El Salvador 2018.

After winning Nuestra Belleza Latina 2013, de Montecristo made appearances on several television shows, was a backstage presenter on Premios Juventud, worked as a model on Sábado Gigante, and made a cameo appearance in the "Fun" music video by Pitbull. As Miss El Salvador 2018, she represented El Salvador at Miss Universe 2018 but failed to place in the Top 20.

== Early life ==
De Montecristo was born on 25 August 1992 in Olocuilta, La Paz. When she was ten years old, the family left El Salvador and settled in Las Vegas, Nevada in the United States. She studied communications as a university student.

== Pageantry ==
In 2013, de Montecristo auditioned in Los Angeles to be a part of Nuestra Belleza Latina 2013, a Latina beauty pageant reality show broadcast on Univision. During the competition, her mentor was Venezuelan Osmel Sousa. She was ultimately selected as one of the twelve finalists, and progressed each week until being declared as the winner. De Montecristo became the first woman from El Salvador to win the competition, in addition to being only the second Central American after Nastassja Bolívar of Nicaragua won Nuestra Belleza Latina 2011. Following her win, she was awarded US$250,000, a new Kia Forte, and a year-long television presenting contract with Univision.

Following her reign as Nuestra Belleza Latina 2013, de Montecristo had planned to take part in Nuestra Belleza El Salvador 2015 competition. However, she dropped out following comments against Mexican immigrants said by Donald Trump, who owned the Miss Universe Organization at the time, which the winner of Nuestra Belleza El Salvador went on to compete in. After Trump sold the organization to WME-IMG, de Montecristo announced that she would compete in the Miss El Salvador 2018 competition. She won and was crowned Miss El Salvador 2018. She went on to represent El Salvador at Miss Universe 2018, where she was unplaced.

Awards and achievements
Preceded by (Puerto Rico) Vanessa De Roide	Nuestra Belleza Latina; 2013	Succeeded by (Puerto Rico) Aleyda Ortiz
Preceded by Alisson Abarca	Miss El Salvador; 2018	Succeeded by Zuleika Soler
