= Alisson Abarca =

Salvadoran model

- Born: Alisson Abarca; 25 January 1996 (age 30); San Salvador, El Salvador
- Height: 5 ft 7 in (170 cm)
- Beauty pageant titleholder
- Title: Miss Universe El Salvador 2017
- Hair color: Dark Brown
- Eye color: Brown
- Major competitions: Miss Universe El Salvador 2017 (Winner); Miss Universe 2017 (Unplaced)

Alisson Abarca (born 25 January 1996) is a Salvadoran model and beauty pageant titleholder who was crowned Miss Universe El Salvador 2017. She represented El Salvador at the Miss Universe 2017 pageant.

== Pageantry ==
=== Miss Universe El Salvador 2017 ===
Abarca was crowned Miss Universe El Salvador 2017 on July 7, 2017, and competed at Miss Universe 2017 but did not place. She was the subject of some controversy in El Salvador for having some plastic surgery after her national win and before the Miss Universe pageant.

=== Miss Universe 2017 ===
As Miss Universe El Salvador, she competed at the Miss Universe 2017 pageant. She gave all her press junket interviews in English, which has not been common for prior representatives from the country.

== Personal ==
Abarca was the valedictorian of her class in high school and speaks English fluently. Abarca is seeking a bachelor's degree in English and hopes to become an English teacher. Abarca was still a university student when she was crowned Miss Universe El Salvador in 2017.

She received both criticism and support for using cosmetic surgery, including breast enhancement, to improve her appearance in preparation for the Miss Universe pageant. Abarca says she is not ashamed.

During the Miss Universe pageant, Abarca dressed in an elaborate costume as "Goddess of the River Lempa." However, during her performance she tripped several times over the fake boat from her costume and couldn't finish the catwalk. Although it likely contributed to her loss, she received an outpouring of support from her fans.

Abarca enjoys soccer, softball, singing and belly dancing. She volunteers at a local orphanage and at her church. She is 1.65 meters (5'4") tall, and has been criticized as being too short for pageantry.

Awards and achievements
Preceded by Idubina Rivas	Miss Universe El Salvador; 2017	Succeeded by Marisela de Montecristo
