= Fuego en el alma =

- Fuego en el alma (Fire in the Soul)
- Directed by: Abdiel Colberg
- Written by: Flora Perez Garay and José Félix Gómez
- Produced by: Rey Pascual; Israel Rodriguez
- Cinematography: Pedro Juan Lopez
- Edited by: Abdiel Colberg
- Music by: José Ojeda
- Production companies: "Amatista Films" and "Y Si Nos Gusta"
- Release date: September 26, 2005 (Puerto Rico)
- Running time: 105 minutes
- Country: Puerto Rico
- Language: Spanish

Fuego en el alma (Fire in the Soul) is a 2005 Puerto Rican film production. The film was produced by Amatista Films and the production company "Y Si Nos Gusta" that belonged to Julián Gil. It was directed by Abdiel Colberg.

== Cast ==
- Julián Gil - Millo
- Daniela Droz - Luisa, Millo's wife
- Braulio Castillo, Jr. - Raúl, lover and photoreporter
- Luisa de los Ríos
- Raúl Dávila - Jorge, Anhelo's husband
- Rey Pascual
- Idalia Pérez Garay - Anhelo
- Néstor Rodulfo - Gabriel

== Film locations ==
The movie was recorded in Puerto Rico: Carolina, Isabela, San Juan and in New York City.
