= Odaray Prats Molina =

Cuban dancer and choreographer

Odaray Prats Molina (born November 13, 1985) is a Cuban professional ballet dancer, dance instructor, choreographer and model. She was dance partner of Henry Santos, winner of Univision Competition Mira Quien Baila Season 3. She was also Top 6 in Nuestra Belleza Latina 2013.

== Early life ==
Prats was born in Havana, Cuba. She started taking ballet classes at age 9 in Alejo Carpentier Elementary School. She received a first position diploma in an international ballet competition when she was 14 years old at ENA School. At the age of 17 she joined the National Ballet Company of Cuba. She graduated and obtained a title as a Professional Ballet Dancer and Teacher.

== Professional career ==
Prats became a soloist as part of the Cuban National Ballet performing different types of ballet dances like classical, neoclassical and contemporary. She worked with renowned dancers and choreographers. She has been able to travel around the world.

Odaray Prats, has worked for different dance companies New Century Dance Company being one of them. As well as performing arts companies such as Florida Grand Opera. Where she was a dancer in the 2011-2012 Rigoletto Production of Florida Grand Opera. Wearing dress designed by costume designer Camilla Haith and assistant Genesis V. Cordoba.

In 2011, once she relocated in Miami she worked as a ballet instructor. Prats collaborated in República de la Copa as a model and entertainer.

In 2013, Odaray was actively working as a dance partner. She became part of dance crew for second time in Mira Quien Baila Season 4. Prats was part of the dance crew in Premio Lo Nuestro performing with Romeo Santos.

In recent Twitter posts Odaray has shared with her fans her participation in TV commercials and Venevision.

== Personal life ==
She is currently residing in Miami, United States. Odaray has offered several interviews where she explains how she came to the United States and the struggles she encountered by leaving her family and ballet career behind to pursue a different path in the entertainment industry.
