= Julián Gil =

Argentine-Puerto Rican film, television, and stage actor

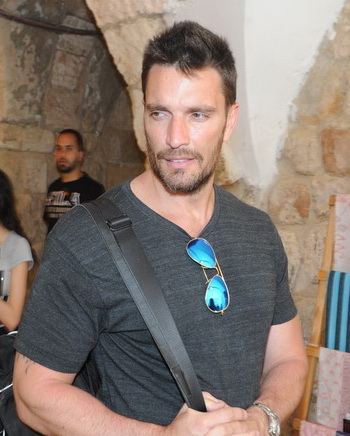
- Gil in 2015
- Born: 13 June 1970 (age 56); Buenos Aires, Argentina
- Occupations: Actor; model; businessman; TV host
- Years active: 1993–present
- Children: 3

Julián Elías Gil Beltrán (born 13 June 1970) is an Argentine-born Puerto Rican actor, model, businessman and TV host.

== Early life ==
Although Gil was born in Argentina, he lived some time in Venezuela as well. He grew up in Puerto Rico and he considers himself Puerto Rican. He has two sisters, Lorena and Patricia.

== Career ==
At the age of 20, he began his career in television with his own shows Apartamento 52, where he was the principal conductor of both television shows. Over the years he has worked for television networks such as RCTV, Telemundo, Univisión and Televisa. From 2001 to 2006 he participated in several films such as Marina, Más allá del límite, Fuego en el alma, El milagro de Coromoto and La caja de problemas, films produced for television.

In 2006, he participated in the Venezuelan telenovela Por todo lo alto, where he interpreted the character "Halcón", which helped to internationalize. The following year, he joined the cast of the telenovela produced by Venevisión and Univisión entitled Acorralada, where he played Pancholón.

From 2007 until 2011, Gil was part of the jury Nuestra Belleza Latina, where he shared credits with Osmel Sousa. In 2008 he participated in Valeria, at the same time he obtained his first antagonist role on television in the telenovela Amor comprado where he played Esteban Rondero. Then he participated in the television series Gabriel, along with Chayanne.

In 2008 he obtained his first starring role in the telenovela Los Barriga. He starred beside the actress Claudia Bérninzon.

In 2009, he participated in the telenovela Sortilegio. In the same year, he became the protagonist of the Spain series Valientes. That year he won the Califa de Oro Award for Best Actor.

In May 2015, Gil officially replaced Fernando Fiore as host of Republica Deportiva.

== Personal life ==
He was married to Brenda Torres. He has a daughter, Nicolle, and a son, Jules. In 2016, he had a romantic relationship with Marjorie de Sousa, with whom he had a son named Matías Gregorio Gil de Sousa. Their relationship ended in 2017 on unfavorable terms.

== Filmography ==
=== Films ===
Year	Title	Role	Notes
2001	Marina	John	
2002	Más allá del límite	Boxer	
2004	La caja de problemas	Gardener	
2005	Fuego en el alma	Millo	
2006	El milagro de Coromoto	Jaime	
2008	Historias Delirantes		
2010	Entre piernas	Paco	
2014	Lotoman 003	El Boricua	
2014	Misterio's: Llamas de sueños	Leonardo Aguilar	
2016	Loki 7	Rodrigo	
2017	Santiago Apóstol	Santiago Apóstol	
2022	Valentino, Be Your Own Hero Or Villain	Fernando	

=== Television ===
Year	Title	Role	Notes
2001	Julián por la noche	Himself	Presenter and director
2002	Mi conciencia y yo	Alfonso	
2004	Apartamento 52	Himself	Presenter and director
2004	La caja de problemas	Gardener	Television film
2006	Decisiones	Efrain	Episode: "La rubia, la triguena & la morena"
2006–2007	Por todo lo alto	Halcón	
2007–2008	Acorralada	Pancho "Pancholón"	
2007	Isla Paraiso	Armando	
2007	Mi adorada Malena	Mateo	
2008; 2010–2013	Nuestra Belleza Latina	Himself	Guest Judge; Celebrity Guest (Season 9 – Season 10)
2008	100 x 35	Himself	Presenter and director
2008	Valeria	Daniel Ferrari	
2008	Amor Comprado	Esteban Rondero	
2008	Los Barriga	Francesco Cézanne	
2008	Gabriel	Dr. Bernardo Padrón	"Perdóname padre porque he pecado" (Season 1, Episode 1); "Libranos de nuestros enemigos" (Season 1, Episode 2); "El último amanecer" (Season 1, Episode 10)
2009	Sortilegio	Ulises	
2009	Valientes	Leo Soto	
2010–2011	Eva Luna	Leonardo "Leo" Arisméndi	Main cast
2011–2012	La que no podía amar	Bruno Rey	Main cast
2012	¿Quién eres tú?	Felipe Esquivel	Lead role
2013	Los secretos de Lucía	Robert Neville	Main cast
2014–2015	Hasta el fin del mundo	Patricio Iturbide	Main cast
2015—2024	República Deportiva	Himself	Presenter
2016	Sueño de amor	Ernesto de la Colina	Main cast
2018–2019	Por amar sin ley	Carlos Ibarra	Main cast
2020	Médicos, línea de vida	Carlos Ibarra	Cameo
2021	¿Qué le pasa a mi familia?	Carlos Iturbide Urquidi	Main cast
2022	La herencia	Próspero Millán Rico	Recurring role
2022–2023	Siéntese quien pueda	Himself	Presenter
2023	El maleficio	Gerardo	Main cast
2024	La isla: desafío extremo	Himself	Contestant
2025	El conquistador	Himself	Host
2026	Tan cerca de ti, nace el amor	Mario Nolivos	

== Theater ==
- 2000: Nueve semanas y media
- 2000: Sexo, pudor y lagrimas
- 2001: En pelotas: Papito
- 2002: Los gallos salvajes: Luciano Miranda Junior
- 2002: El cotorrito by the sea: Bugambilia
- 2004: La princesa en el lago de los cisnes
- 2005: Luminaria: Franz
- 2003: Tarzan – Salvemos la selva: Tarzan
- 2005: El crimen del Padre Amaro: Padre Amaro Viera
- 2007: Descarados
- 2008: ¿Por qué los hombre aman a las cabronas?: Jorge
- 2013: Aquel tiempo de campeones: Phil Romano
- 2015: Divorciemonos mi amor: Benigna "Benny"

== Awards and nominations ==
Year	Association	Category	Telenovela	Result
2010	Premios People en Español	Best Male Revelation	Sortilegio	Won
2011	Premios Juventud	What a Hottie!	Eva Luna	Nominated
2011	Premios People En Español	Best Male Antagonist	Eva Luna	Won
2012	Premios People En Español	Best Male Antagonist	La que no podía amar	Nominated
2014	Premios People En Español	Best Male Antagonist	Hasta El Fin Del Mundo	Nominated
2017	35th TVyNovelas Awards	Best Male Antagonist	Sueno De Amor	Nominated
2019	37th TVyNovelas Awards	Best Male Antagonist	Por amar sin ley	Nominated

Latino Wall Street Award, 2024 “Liderazgo Excepcional”
