= Denise Bidot =

American plus-size fashion model (born 1986)

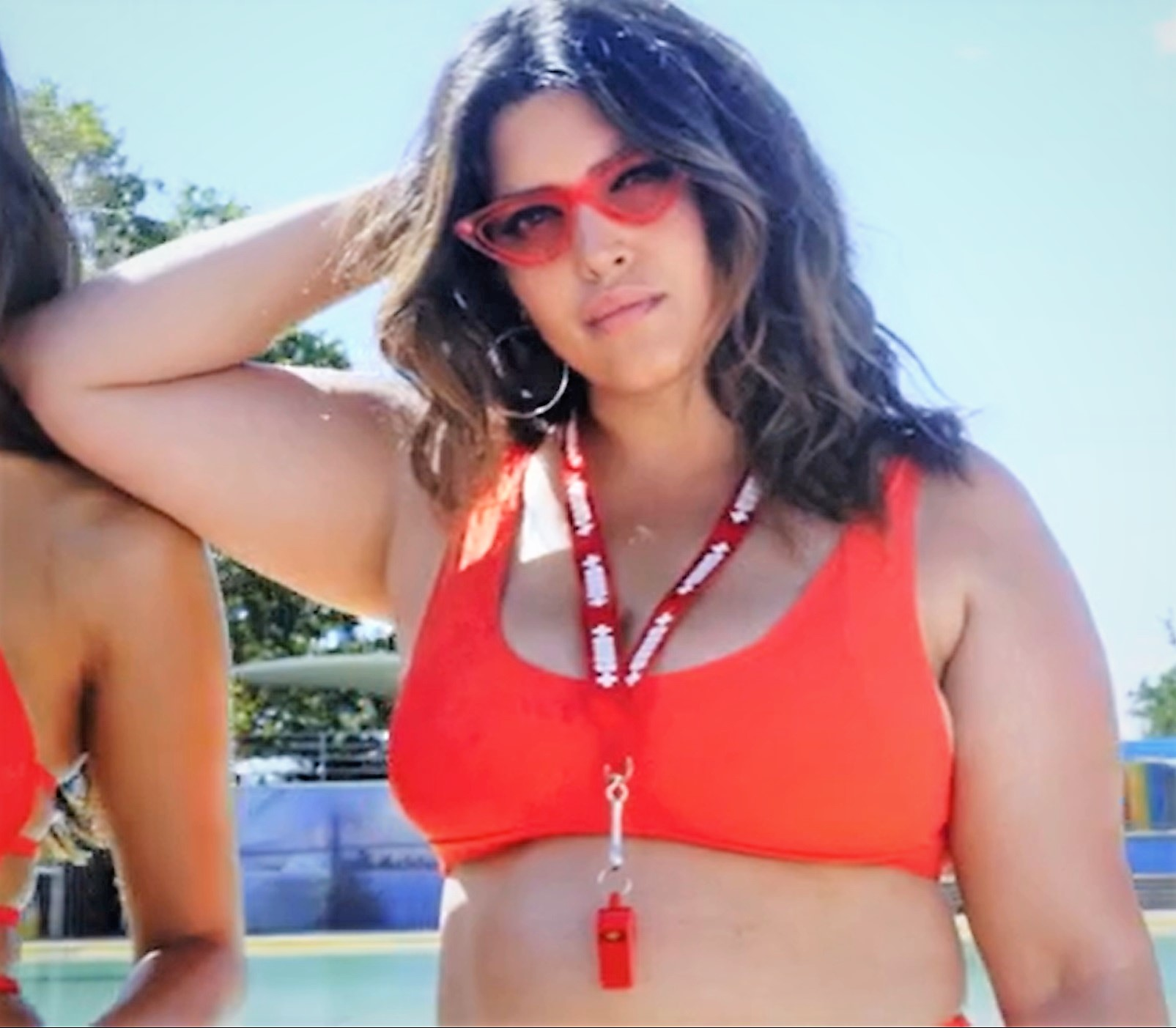
- Bidot advertising for Chromat in 2018
- Born: Denise Marie Bidot; June 13, 1986 (age 40); Miami, Florida, U.S.
- Occupation: Model
- Years active: 2014–present
- Known for: There Is No Wrong Way to Be a Woman
- Partner: Lil Wayne (2020–2022)
- Children: 1
- Modeling information
- Height: 5 ft 9 in (1.75 m)
- Hair color: Brunette
- Eye color: Brown
- Agency: Creative Artists Agency (New York, Los Angeles)

Denise Marie Bidot (born June 13, 1986) is an American plus-size fashion model.

== Early life ==
Bidot was born on June 13, 1986, in Miami, Florida. Her mother is of Puerto Rican descent while her father is of Kuwaiti descent. Bidot’s mother was a beauty pageant winner who was aspiring to become a professional model, but had struggled to make it in the business due to her plus-size figure and was failing to lose weight. Bidot had started acting at the age of 12, then started traveling to California at the age of 18 to pursue an acting career. She had faced the same challenges as her mother did with being told to lose weight in order to make it in acting. After giving up on acting, Bidot decided to work behind the scenes as a makeup artist.

== Career ==
While working as a makeup artist, Bidot was discovered by a photographer who had approached her about getting into modelling, to which she agreed. In 2014, Bidot became the first plus-size model to walk the runway for two straight-size brands during New York Fashion Week. Bidot has worked for clients such as Nordstrom, Forever21, Target, Old Navy, Lane Bryant, Levi's, Macy's. Bidot has been featured on several television shows including nuvoTV's Curvy Girls, HBO's Habla Women, and Yahoo! En Español web series Mama vs. Mama. She has also been included on segments on The Tyra Banks Show and The Real. In 2016, Bidot launched a lifestyle movement called "There Is No Wrong Way to Be a Woman". Bidot is one of the featured models in the 2016 documentary film Straight/Curve. In December 2016, Bidot's picture of her wearing a two-piece bathing suit in Lane Bryant's new resort collection ad campaign with the photo unretouched showing her stretch marks went viral within hours. In 2018, Bidot joined Univision's reality television beauty pageant Nuestra Belleza Latina as a main judge.

== Personal life ==
Bidot and her childhood sweetheart, Joshua Adams, have a daughter, Joselyn Adams, who was born in 2008.

Bidot began dating rapper and producer Lil Wayne in June 2020. They broke up that November once Bidot noticed Wayne supporting former president of the United States, Donald Trump. They reconciled shortly after. They ended their relationship again in early 2022. On May 12, 2025, Bidot accused Lil Wayne of verbal and emotional abuse, furthermore claiming that the pair broke up on May 9, 2025, during a Mother's Day celebration, kicking her and her daughter out of his house.
