= Nuestra Belleza Latina 2011 =

- Season 5
- Hosted by: Giselle Blondet
- Judges: Osmel Sousa; Lupita Jones; Julián Gil
- No. of contestants: 13
- Winner: Nastassja Bolivar
- Runner-up: Gredmarie Colon

Release
- Original network: Univision
- Original release: March 6 – May 22, 2011

Season chronology
- ← Previous; Nuestra Belleza Latina 2010 Next → Nuestra Belleza Latina 2012

Nuestra Belleza Latina 2011 is the fifth season of Nuestra Belleza Latina. The season premiered on Univision on Sunday March 6, 2011 and concluded on May 22, 2011.

Auditions for the show were held in January and February 2011 in the cities of Chicago, San Antonio, New York City, Los Angeles, Miami, and San Juan, Puerto Rico. During the audition process, 73 women were given passes to the semi-finals in Miami. Two contestants were chosen from online auditions, with the help of public votes.

The winner of the competition was Nastassja Bolívar from Nicaragua. She received a contract with Univision, $250,000 in cash and prizes, a correspondent position on El Gordo y la Flaca and the opportunity to reign as Nuestra Belleza Latina for a year.

== Auditions ==
Open casting calls for the show were held in the cities listed below:

- January 6, 2011 in Chicago, Illinois
- January 15, 2011 in San Antonio, Texas
- January 20, 2011 in Los Angeles, California
- January 29, 2011 in San Juan, Puerto Rico
- February 5, 2011 in New York City, New York
- February 19, 2011 in Miami, Florida

Separate online auditions were held from January 6 to February 19 on the show's website. The public were allowed to select two contestants from the online auditions to advance to the semi-finals.

== Cast ==
=== Contestants ===
(Ages stated are at time of contest)

Country	Contestant	Age	Finish
(Dominican Republic)	Yahaira Nuñes	24	12th place
(Mexico)	Paulette Acosta	19	11th place
(Cuba)	Juliete Cabrera	23	Disqualified^{1}
(Mexico)	Jocell Villa	19	10th place
(Puerto Rico)	Darla Delgado	22	9th place
(Mexico)	Maribel De Santiago	27	8th place
(Ecuador)	Diana Cano	24	7th place
(Puerto Rico)	Patricia Corcino	23	6th place
(Mexico)	Miriam Hernandez	21	5th place
(Cuba)	Jenny Arzola	22	3rd runner-up^{1}
(Colombia)	Nicole Suarez	19	2nd runner-up
(Puerto Rico)	Gredmarie Colón	22	1st runner-up
(Nicaragua)	Nastassja Bolívar	22	Winner

=== Judges ===
Osmel Sousa	President of the Miss Venezuela organization
Lupita Jones	Miss Universe 1991 and president of Nuestra Belleza México
Julian Gil	Argentine-born Puerto Rican-raised model and actor

== Episodes ==
=== Episode 1 ===
Original air date: 6 March 2011

The episode was a compilation from all of the auditions that had been held during the two months prior, and featured several guest appearances at panel from various celebrities. In order to receive a pass for boot camp in Miami, each aspiring contestant had to score a minimum of at least five points during her interview.

- Guest judges: Eddie "Piolín" Sotelo (Los Angeles), Julian Gil (Puerto Rico, New York City), Jackie Guerrido (Chicago), Vadhir Derbez (Texas), Carlos Calderón (Miami)

=== Episode 2 ===
Original air date: 13 March 2011

The first group of contestants selected during the auditions were flown to Miami, where they received training and classes in diction, choreography, fitness, and runway. Several contestants performed badly, and were eliminated by the judges. The remaining semi-finalists at the end of the first week had a runway presentation in swimwear during the first live gala, and had to explain why they should be chosen as the winner of the competition. Two of the semi-finalists (Altagracia Garcia and Natasha Rodriguez) had to leave the competition due to health concerns. At the end of the week, only 12 semi-finalists remained.

Semi-finalists from group 1:

Contestant	Age	Country	Audition	Contestant	Age	Country	Audition
Altagracia Garcia (Note: Altagracia Garcia quit do exhaustion, caused by her illness, Lupus.)	18	(Puerto Rico) (Dominican Republic)	New York	Nicole Suarez	19	(Colombia)	Los Angeles
Bruna Silva	22	(Brazil)	San Antonio	Patricia Cardona	26	(Colombia)	Miami
Darla Delgado	22	(Puerto Rico)	Puerto Rico	Patricia Corcino (Note: Patricia Corcino, had previously auditioned for Nuestra Belleza Latina 2010 but did not make it to the final 12.)	22	(Puerto Rico)	Puerto Rico
Diana Cano	24	(Ecuador)	New York	Ruth Fabiny	25	(Paraguay)	Chicago
Diane Ocañe	24	(Puerto Rico)	New York	Saidee Collado	22	(Mexico) (Cuba)	Miami
Hanna Tejada	24	(Mexico)	Los Angeles	Sonia Rivera	19	(Mexico)	Los Angeles
Joseline Farrera	21	(Mexico)	Los Angeles	Vanessa Arriola	20	(Mexico)	Los Angeles
Juliete Cabrera	23	(Cuba)	Miami	Vanessa Reyes	22	(El Salvador)	Chicago
Maribel De Santiago	27	(Mexico)	All (Note: Maribel De Santiago auditioned in every city, but only received a pass during her final audition in Miami.)	Veronica Mayorga	25	(Mexico)	Chicago
Miriam Hernandez	21	(Mexico)	San Antonio	Yahaira Nuñes	24	(Dominican Republic)	New York
Nastassja Bolivar	22	(Nicaragua)	Miami	Zuleidy Cirino	22	(Puerto Rico)	Puerto Rico
Natasha Rodriguez (Note: Natasha Gonzalez quit after finding out she was 5 weeks pregnant.)	23	(Puerto Rico)	Puerto Rico				

The contestant was chosen as one of the top 12 among that group and advanced into the top 24.
The contestant quit the competition.

- Special guest: Prince Royce

=== Episode 3 ===
Original air date: 20 March 2011

The second group of contestants was flown to Miami for their lessons and training. At the end of the week only 24 semi-finalists remained. After a series of challenges during the second live gala, the judges chose the final 12 contestants from group two, who would advance into the top 24 to compete for a place in the beauty mansion.

Semi-finalists from group 2:

Contestant	Age	Country	Audition	Contestant	Age	Country	Audition
Adrialys Gutiérrez	18	(Cuba)	Miami	Gredmarie Colón (Note: Gredmarie Colon had previously auditioned for Nuestra Belleza Latina 2010 but did not make it to the final 12.)	22	(Puerto Rico)	Puerto Rico
Alexandra Olavarría	26	(Venezuela)	Miami	Jenny Arzola	22	(Cuba)	New York
Ana Valencia	24	(Mexico)	Los Angeles	Jessica Sepúlveda	19	(Colombia)	New York
Audris Rijo	25	(Dominican Republic)	New York	Jocell Villa	19	(Mexico)	Los Angeles
Betzabe Arzola	21	(Venezuela)	Los Angeles	Laurita Rodríguez	25	(Mexico)	San Antonio
Carol Ramos	24	(Puerto Rico)	Online (Note: Vivian Valadez and Carol Ramos were the two contestants selected from the online auditions.)	Leslie Galarreta	24	(Peru)	San Antonio
Claudia Carlos	18	(Mexico)	Los Angeles	Paulette Acosta	19	(Mexico)	Miami
Deyanira Díaz	26	(Cuba)	Miami	Roxana Lucero	23	(Mexico) (Nicaragua)	Los Angeles
Eliana Moreno	25	(Colombia)	San Antonio	Tessy Acevedo	20	(Puerto Rico)	Puerto Rico
Erica Fulcar	23	(Dominican Republic)	New York	Vivian Valadez	24	(Mexico)	Online
Fabiola González	25	(Mexico)	Chicago	Yashira Ayala	24	(Puerto Rico)	Puerto Rico
Graciela Montenegro	20	(Guatemala)	New York	Yhoana Martínez	22	(Mexico)	Chicago

The contestant was chosen as one of the top 12 among that group and advanced into the top 24.

- Special guest: Gloria Trevi

=== Episode 4 ===
Original air date: 27 March 2011

The remaining 24 semi-finalists from both groups received makeovers and had a photo shoot session in bikinis. They also took part in their first challenge, which was won by Gredmarie Colon. The three semi-finalists with the most votes, Maribel, Darla, and Gredmarie, received passes into the top 12. One of the semi-finalists, Audris Rijo from the Dominican Republic, decided to drop out of the competition due to a family emergency. Throughout the rest of the night, the judges chose the remaining 9 contestants who would move into the beauty mansion as finalists.

Top 24 semi-finalists:

Contestant	Age	Country	Audition	Contestant	Age	Country	Audition
Alexandra Olavarría	26	(Venezuela)	Miami	Juliete Cabrera	23	(Cuba)	Miami
Ana Valencia	24	(Mexico)	Los Angeles	Maribel De Santiago	27	(Mexico)	All
Audris Rijo (Note: Audris Rijo quit the competition due to a family emergency.)	25	(Dominican Republic)	New York	Miriam Hernandez	21	(Mexico)	San Antonio
Carol Ramos	24	(Puerto Rico)	Online	Nastassja Bolivar	22	(Nicaragua)	Los Angeles
Darla Delgado	22	(Puerto Rico)	Puerto Rico	Nicole Suarez	19	(Colombia)	Los Angeles
Deyanira Díaz	26	(Cuba)	Miami	Patricia Corcino	22	(Puerto Rico)	Puerto Rico
Diana Cano	24	(Ecuador)	New York	Paulette Acosta	19	(Mexico)	Miami
Fabiola González	25	(Mexico)	Chicago	Saidee Collado	22	(Mexico) (Cuba)	Miami
Gredmarie Colón	22	(Puerto Rico)	Puerto Rico	Sonia Rivera	19	(Mexico)	Los Angeles
Hanna Tejada	24	(Mexico)	Los Angeles	Vivian Valadez	24	(Mexico)	Online
Jenny Arzola	22	(Cuba)	New York	Yahaira Nuñes	24	(Dominican Republic)	New York
Jocell Villa	19	(Mexico)	Los Angeles	Yashira Ayala	24	(Puerto Rico)	Puerto Rico

The contestant was chosen as one of the top 12 finalists.
The contestant quit the competition.

- Challenge winner: Gredmarie Colon (Puerto Rico)
- Special guests: R.K.M & Ken-Y

=== Episode 5 ===
Original air date: 3 April 2011

The 12 chosen contestants moved into the beauty mansion, and took part in their first challenge, which was won as a group by Maribel, Gredmarie, Diana, Josell, Miriam, and Paulette. The contestants also began a strict regimen of lessons, rehearsals, and exercise in preparation for the live galas every week. For the live portion of the show, the contestants took part in a scored challenge in front of the judges, which was won by Nastassja. The three contestants with the fewest votes from the public (Nicole, Patricia, and Yahaira) were automatically nominated for elimination. Of the three, Patricia received the fewest votes overall and had to face the judges for their final decision. The contestants who were safe then had to nominate one of the other two contestants (Nicole or Yahaira) for elimination. They chose Yahaira, who joined Patricia in the bottom two. The judges decided to retain Patricia, and Yahaira was eliminated from the competition.

- Main challenge winners: Maribel De Santiago, Gredmarie Colon, Diana Cano, Josell Villa, Miriam Hernandez, and Paulette Acosta
- Live challenge winner: Nastassja Bolivar
- Bottom three: Nicole Suarez, Patricia Corcino, and Yahaira Nuñes
- Bottom two: Patricia Corcino (by popular vote at 4.0%) and Yahaira Nuñes (by fellow contestants)
- Eliminated: Yahaira Nuñes
- Special guests: Lucero and Larry Hernandez

=== Episode 6 ===
Original air date: 10 April 2011

The contestants participated in two challenges; the first took place at a construction site, and the second was a pole dancing challenge. For the first challenge, the contestants had to perform naturally in an interview while standing in the midst of construction activity. The winner of this challenge was Nicole Suarez. The pole-dancing challenge was won by Patricia Corcino. After these challenges, the contestant with the lowest votes from the public was Paulette Acosta, and the worst rated contestants were Jocell Villa and Diana Cano. The judges chose to eliminate Acosta.

- Challenge of the week winner: Nicole Suarez
- Guest Artist: Tito El Bambino
- Mini-Challenge Winner: "Pole Dancing" Patricia Corcino (29 points)
- First Call-Out (At the Final Runway): Nastassja Bolivar
- Given the opportunity to save fellow Contestant: Nicole Suarez
- Bottom Three: Jocell Villa, Diana Cano and Paulette Acosta
- Sent to bottom two by Viewers Lowest Percentage of votes: Paulette Acosta 3.8%
- Sent to bottom two by fellow Contestants: Jocell Villa
- Saved by the Judges: Jocell Villa
- Eliminated: Paulette Acosta

=== Episode 7 ===
Original air date: 17 April 2011

Julitete Cabrera is eliminated from the show at the start of the episode after it is revealed that she had taken part in a sexually suggestive photoshoot. The production replaces her with a previously eliminated contestant, Jenny Arzola. The main challenge of the week involved a visit to the Miami Zoo to test the courage of the contestants when encountering snakes and other animals. After the challenges, Jocell Villa was eliminated from the competition. The most successful contestants, Patricia Corcino and Nastassja Bolivar, were rewarded with a dinner with Alejandro Chaban and Giselle Blondet, and were taken to a concert in Miami.

- Challenge of the week winner: Patricia Corcino and Nastassja Bolivar
- Guest Artist: Maná and Joe Montana
- Mini-Challenge Winner: "Reptile Cave/Amazonian Interview" Darla Delgado
- First Call-Out (At the Final Runway): Gredmarie Colon
- Given the opportunity to save fellow Contestant: Nastassja Bolivar
- Bottom Three: Diana Cano, Nicole Suarez, Jocell Villa
- Sent to bottom two by Viewers Lowest Percentage of votes: Nicole Suarez 8.6%
- Sent to bottom two by fellow Contestants: Jocell Villa
- Saved by the Judges: Nicole Suarez
- Re-Entered the Competition: Jenny Arzola
- Automatic Expulsion: Juliete Cabrera
- Eliminated: Jocell Villa

=== Episode 8 ===
Original air date: 24 April 2011

For the mini-challenge, the contestants competed in a boxing competition, and the winner was Gredmarie Colon. For the main challenge, the contestants took turns to portray a character on stage with an actor. All the contestants were dressed the same and directed to act the same scene, and the judges ranked the performances. The winner of this challenge was Nicole Suarez. Dala Delgado was eliminated from the competition.

- Challenge of the week winner: Nicole Suarez
- Guest Artist: Los Horóscopos de Durango
- Guest Celebrity in Challenge: Sebastián Rulli
- Mini-Challenge Winner: "Cereza" Gredmarie Colon
- First Call-Out (At the Final Runway): Miriam Hernandez
- Given the opportunity to save fellow Contestant: Nicole Suarez
- Bottom Three: Diana Cano, Patricia Corcino, Darla Delgado
- Sent to bottom two by Viewers Lowest Percentage of votes: Patricia Corcino
- Sent to bottom two by fellow Contestants: Tied. Darla Delgado 9.1%, Diana Cano 10%
- Saved by the Judges: Patricia Corcino
- Eliminated: Darla Delgado

=== Episode 9 ===
Original air date: 1 May 2011

The first challenge for this episode was sponsored by Subway, and the contestants were directed to host a cooking show that also featured an exercise segment. The winner of this was Nasstajsa Bolivar, who received $10,000 as a prize. In the second challenge, entitled "Dancing with the Stars", the contestants were paired with a dancer and competed in a dance competition. Following the challenges, Maribel de Santiago was eliminated.

Dancing with the Stars (Individual judges scores in the chart below (given in parentheses) are listed in this order from left to right:Julian Gil, Lupita Jones and Osmel Sousa)

Artist	Paired with	Score	Dance
Raúl González	Patricia Corcino	(9,9,8)= 26	Salsa
Rodolfo Jiménez	Diana Cano	(4,5,4)= 13	Pop
Alfonso de Anda	Nastassja Bolivar	(8,8,7)= 23	Merengue
Carlos Calderón	Miriam Hernandez	(10,8,8)= 26	Flamenco
Rafael Mercadante	Gredmarie Colon	(9,10,8)= 27	Regional Mexicano
Johnny Lozada	Nicole Suarez	(8,7,6)= 21	Folklorico
Felipe Viel	Maribel De Santiago	(4,6,0)= 10	Rock and Roll
Tony Andrade	Jenny Arzola	(7,7,5)= 19	Waltz

Special Guest at Mansion:

Season	Guest	Help/Advice
2007	Martha Maria López	Helped Maribel De Santiago with her runway walk
2008	Zoila Ceballos	Helped Nastassja Bolivar and Gredmarie Colon, giving Nastassja an Attitude boost, and Gredmarie toning her energy down.
2009	Marycarmen López	Helped Miriam Hernandez, open up to the audience and boosting her confidence.
2010	Bárbara Moros	Advised Diana Cano to tone down her aggressively and to not raise her eyebrows, which read as arrogance.

- Guest Artist: None
- Challenge of the week winner: Nastassja Bolivar
- Guest Celebrity in Challenge: Raúl González, Rodolfo Jiménez, Alfonso de Anda, Carlos Calderón, Rafael Mercadante, Johnny Lozada, Felipe Viel, Tony Andrade
- Mini-Challenge Winner: "Dancing with the Stars" Gredmarie Colon
- First Call-Out (At the Final Runway): Patricia Corcino
- Given the opportunity to save fellow Contestant: Nastassja Bolivar
- Bottom Three: Diana Cano, Jenny Arzola, Maribel De Santiago
- Sent to bottom two by Viewers Lowest Percentage of votes: Jenny Arzola 8.3%
- Sent to bottom two by fellow Contestants: Maribel De Santiago
- Saved by the Judges: Jenny Arzola
- Eliminated: Maribel De Santiago

=== Episode 10 ===
Original air date: 8 May 2011

In this episode, the contestants were given a photo of a celebrity that they had to imitate by using makeup, wigs and costumes in a photoshoot. In another challenge, they had to do a catwalk with their mothers in honor of Mother's Day. In the final challenge, the contestants had to present television segments. After these challenges, Diana Cano was eliminated by the judges.

Nuestra Belleza Anchor

Anchor	Contestant	Score
Bárbara Bermudo	Diana Cano	(8,8,5)= 21
Chiquinquirá Delgado	Miriam Hernandez	(7,8,5)= 20
Marisa del Portillo	Jenny Arzola	(8,8,5)= 21
Lili Estefan	Nicole Suarez	(7,7,4)= 18
María Elena Salinas	Patricia Corcino	(9,9,8)= 26
Jackie Guerrido	Gredmarie Colon	(9,8,8)= 25
Lourdes Stephen	Nastassja Bolivar	(4,5,2)= 11

- Challenge of the week winner: Miriam Hernandez and Nastassja Bolivar
- Guest Artist: Intocable
- Mini-Challenge Winner: "Nuestra Belleza Anchor" Patricia Corcino
- First Call-Out (At the Final Runway): Nicole Suarez
- Given the opportunity to save fellow Contestant: None
- Bottom Three: Diana Cano, Jenny Arzola and Nastassja Bolivar
- Sent to bottom two by Viewers Lowest Percentage of votes: Jenny Arzola 11.6%
- Sent to bottom two by fellow Contestants: Diana Cano
- Saved by the Judges: Jenny Arzola
- Eliminated: Diana Cano

=== Episode 11 ===
Original air date: 15 May 2011

The contestants are taken to a Miami beach. While there, the contestants are approached by a group of actors who verbally abuse them. The contestants are then immediately told to do a catwalk challenge on the beach, where they must perform while overcoming negative feelings from being criticized. In the next challenge, the contestants competed in a trivia challenge. After the challenges, the judges eliminated Miriam Hernandez.

The Final Question

Contestant	Judge/Occupation	Question	Score
Miriam Hernandez	Carlos Alvarez - Univision Radio Klove 107.5 (Los Angeles)	"¿Si tuvieras la opportunidad de hablar con el presidente de los Estados Unidos, de una reforma immigratoria que le dirias?"	(5,5,3)= 13
Patricia Corcino	Luis Alfonso Borego- Editor and Chief of TvyNovelas (US)	"¿Al principio de esta competencia tus compañeras estaban contra ti, que consejo le darias a adolecentes que estan pasando por algo similar?"	(7,8,4)= 19
Nastassja Bolivar	Sara Moreno- Editor and Chief of El General	"¿Has manifestado que te gusta luchar por tus sueños y que tu familia es sumamente importante para ti, que harias si tu familia algun dia se opusiera alguno de estos sueños?"	(9,10,3)= 22
Gredmarie Colon	Mark Thacher- El Triunfo del Amor Actor	"¿Las estadisticas dicen que las parejas de artistas son dificiles de llevar, puesto que tu eres la esposa de Alexis (Duo Alexis & Fido) cual seria tu secreto para llevar una buena relacion con tu pareja?"	(8,10,7)= 25
Nicole Suarez	Angie Romero- Editor and Chief of Latina Magazine	"¿Has manifestado que te gusta estar enfrente de la camara, y por esa razon estudias periodismo. Si alguien te dijera que estar en Nuestra Belleza Latina es lo opuesto al periodismo que les dirias?"	(10,10,9)= 29
Jenny Arzola	Rodner Figueroa- Univision Fashionista	"¿Muchos criticos dicen que para estar en un concurso de Belleza se nesesita hacer cosas extremas (Alimentacion, Ejercicio) para ganar la corona que les dirias a estos criticos?"	(6,6,2)= 14

- Challenge of the week winner: Nicole Suarez
- Guest Artist: Chino & Nacho
- Guest in Mini-Challenge: Carlos Alvarez, Luis Alfonso Borego, Sara Moreno, Mark Thacher, Angie Romero and Rodner Figueroa
- Mini-Challenge Winner: "The Final Question" Nicole Suarez
- First Call-Out (At the Final Runway): Gredmarie Colon
- Bottom Two (Lowest Percentage of votes): Jenny Arzola and Patricia Corcino
- Bottom Two (By the judges): Nastassja Bolivar and Miriam Hernandez
- Saved by the Judges: Nastassja Bolivar
- Eliminated (Lowest Percentage of votes): Patricia Corcino 11.9%
- Eliminated (By the judges): Miriam Hernandez

=== Episode 12 ===
Original air date: 22 May 2011

The final four contestants competed in a dance challenge, which was won by Gredmarie Colon. The judges then assessed the contestants for their performance across the whole season, and chose Nastassja Bolivar as the overall winner of the competition.

- 3rd runner-up: Jenny Arzola (Cuba)
- 2nd runner-up: Nicole Suarez (Colombia)
- 1st runner-up: Gredmarie Colon (Puerto Rico)
- Nuestra Belleza Latina 2011: Nastassja Bolivar (Nicaragua)
- Special guests: Aarón Díaz, Luis Fonsi, Ana Patricia González (2010 winner), Greydis Gil (2009 winner), Melissa Marty (2008 winner), Alejandra Espinoza (2007 winner)

== Elimination table ==
Place	Country	Contestant	Week											
Place	Country	Contestant	3/13 (Ep. 2)	3/20 (Ep. 3)	3/27 (Ep. 4)	4/3 (Ep. 5)	4/10 (Ep. 6)	4/17 (Ep. 7)	4/24 (Ep. 8)	5/1 (Ep. 9)	5/8 (Ep. 10)	5/15 (Semifinal)^{3}		5/22 (Final)
1	(Nicaragua)	Nastassja Bolívar	GRP1		SAFE	SAFE	SAFE	SAFE	SAFE	WIN	BTM3	SAFE	BTM2	Winner
2	(Puerto Rico)	Gredmarie Colón		GRP2	WIN	WIN	SAFE	SAFE	SAFE	SAFE	SAFE	SAFE	SAFE	1st runner-up
3	(Colombia)	Nicole Suarez	GRP1		SAFE	BTM3	WIN	BTM2	WIN	SAFE	SAFE	WIN	WIN	2nd runner-up
4	(Cuba)	Jenny Arzola		GRP2	ELIM			RET^{1}	SAFE	BTM2	BTM2	BTM2	SAFE	3rd runner-up
5	(Mexico)	Miriam Hernandez	GRP1		SAFE	WIN	SAFE	SAFE	SAFE	SAFE	WIN	SAFE	ELIM	
6	(Puerto Rico)	Patricia Corcino	GRP1		SAFE	BTM2	SAFE	WIN	BTM2	SAFE	SAFE	ELIM		
7	(Ecuador)	Diana Cano	GRP1		SAFE	WIN	BTM3	BTM3	BTM3^{2}	BTM3	ELIM			
8	(Mexico)	Maribel De Santiago	GRP1		SAFE	WIN	SAFE	SAFE	SAFE	ELIM				
9	(Puerto Rico)	Darla Delgado		GRP2	SAFE	SAFE	SAFE	SAFE	ELIM					
10	(Mexico)	Jocell Villa		GRP2	SAFE	WIN	BTM2	ELIM						
DQ	(Cuba)	Juliette Cabrera	GRP1		SAFE	SAFE	SAFE	DISQ^{1}						
11	(Mexico)	Paulette Acosta		GRP2	SAFE	WIN	ELIM							
12	(Dominican Republic)	Yahaira Nuñes	GRP1		SAFE	ELIM								

The contestant was part of the semi-finalists from group 1.
The contestant was part of the semi-finalists from group 2.
The contestant won the week's reward challenge.
The contestant was eliminated.
The contestant was in the bottom three, but was saved by the other contestants.
The contestant was in the bottom two.
The contestant was disqualified from the competition.
The contestant re-entered the competition, replacing a contestant who was disqualified.
The contestant was a finalist, but did not win.
The contestant was the runner-up.
The contestant won Nuestra Belleza Latina 2011.

== Notes ==
1. Juliette was disqualified from the competition after it was revealed on some of the show's online forums that she had taken part in several sexually suggestive photo shoots, which was against the rules for eligibility in the competition. She was replaced by Jenny Arzola, who had been eliminated some weeks prior during the selection of the final 12.
2. In episode 8, Darla, Diana, and Patricia received the fewest votes and were in the bottom three. Patricia received the fewest votes overall and had to face the judges for elimination. The contestants who were safe had to decide which of the other two contestants (Darla and Diana) would be facing elimination with Patricia. The votes were evenly split. In order to break the tie, the decision was brought back to the public vote. Among the two, Darla received the second lowest number of votes, landing her in the bottom two. Diana was saved by default.
3. During the week of the semifinal, there were two separate eliminations. The first was based entirely on the results of the viewer vote, Jenny and Patricia received the fewest votes, but Patricia received the fewest votes overall, resulting in her elimination. During the remainder of the evening, Gredmarie, Nicole, and Jenny received gold 'passes' for the grand finale. The last pass was left between Miriam and Nastassja. The judges decided to save Nastassja, and Miriam was eliminated.
