= Nastassja Bolívar =

Nicaraguan beauty queen

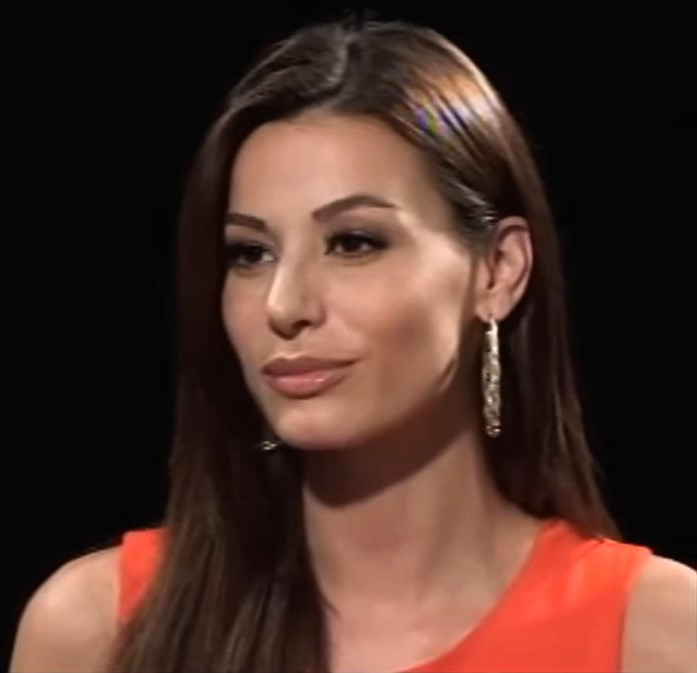
- Bolívar interviewed in 2014
- Born: Nastassja Isabella Bolívar Cifuentes; October 24, 1988 (age 37); Miami, Florida, U.S.
- Height: 1.78 m (5 ft 10 in)
- Beauty pageant titleholder
- Title: Nuestra Belleza Latina 2011; Miss Nicaragua 2013
- Hair color: Black
- Eye color: Brown
- Major competitions: Nuestra Belleza Latina 2011 (Winner); Miss Nicaragua 2013 (Winner); Miss Universe 2013 (Top 16) (Best National Costume)

Nastassja Isabella Bolívar Cifuentes (born October 24, 1988) is a Nicaraguan-American actress, tv host and beauty queen who won Nuestra Belleza Latina 2011 and was crowned Miss Nicaragua 2013 and represented Nicaragua at Miss Universe 2013.

== Early life ==
Bolívar was born in Miami to a Colombian father and a Nicaraguan mother and speaks English, Spanish and French. When she auditioned for Nuestra Belleza Latina 2011 she was studying fashion merchandising at Miami International University of Art and Design. However, with the possibility of appearing in many programs for a year when Univision offered the contract, she decided to venture into television production .

== Pageantry ==
=== Nuestra Belleza Latina 2011 ===
On May 22, 2011, Nastassja Bolivar from Nicaragua won the beauty pageant/reality show Nuestra Belleza Latina 2011 on Univision. After 12 weeks of competition, Nastassja won $250,000 in cash and prizes and a one-year contract with the Univision Network. She is the first (and so far only) winner who was born and raised in the continental United States.

=== Miss Nicaragua 2013 ===
Nastassja Bolivar was crowned Miss Nicaragua 2013 at the 31st edition of Miss Nicaragua beauty contest. Outgoing titleholder Farah Eslaquit crowned Bolívar as Miss Nicaragua 2013 at the beauty contest that took place at the Ruben Dario National Theater on Saturday night of March 2, 2013. This win gave her the right to represent Nicaragua at Miss Universe 2013.

=== Miss Universe 2013 ===
Bolivar represented Nicaragua at the Miss Universe 2013 pageant on November 9, 2013, in Moscow, Russia , eventually finishing in the Top 16. During the preliminary competition Nastassja won Best National Costume and was awarded a $5,000 Credit Card from Russian Standard Bank.

After the contest, Bolívar had her crown taken away by director of the franchise, Karen Celebertti, for insubordination.

Awards and achievements
Preceded by (Mexico) Ana Patricia González	Nuestra Belleza Latina; 2011	Succeeded by (Puerto Rico) Vanessa De Roide
Preceded by Farah Eslaquit	Miss Nicaragua; 2013	Succeeded by Marline Barberena
