= Aleyda Ortiz =

Puerto Rican model, TV host, actress and beauty pageant titleholder

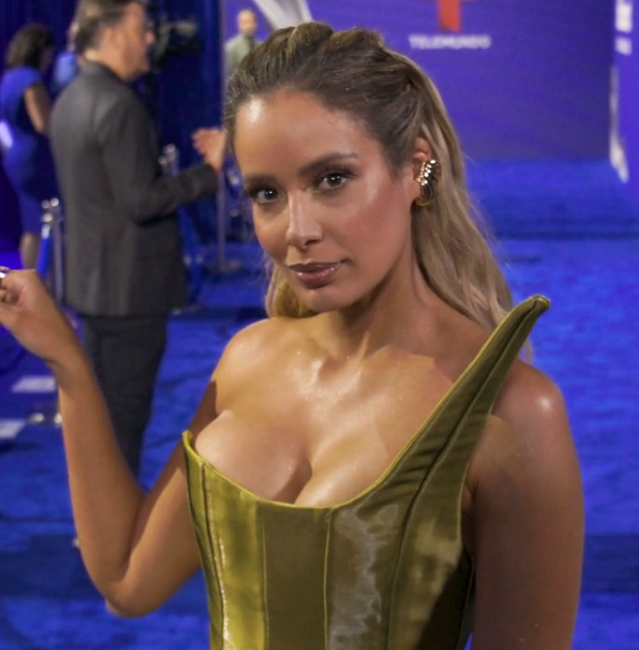
- Ortiz at the 2024 Billboard Latin Music Awards red carpet
- Born: Aleyda Enid Ortiz Rodríguez; October 5, 1988 (age 38); Bayamón, Puerto Rico
- Occupations: Model, TV host, Actress
- Height: 1.75 m (5 ft 9 in)
- Spouse: Ricardo Casanova (m. 2019)
- Beauty pageant titleholder
- Title: Miss Universe Bayamón 2014; Miss Intercontinental Puerto Rico 2013; Nuestra Belleza Latina 2014
- Hair color: Medium Brown
- Eye color: Brown
- Major competitions: Miss Universe Puerto Rico 2014 (1st Runner-Up); Miss Intercontinental 2013 (1st Runner-Up); Nuestra Belleza Latina 2014 (winner) (Mira Quien Baila 2020) (runner-up)

Aleyda Enid Ortiz Rodríguez (born October 5, 1988 in Bayamón) is a Puerto Rican model, TV host, actress and beauty pageant titleholder who finished as 1st Runner-Up at Miss Universe Puerto Rico 2014 and Miss Intercontinental 2013. She was later crowned Nuestra Belleza Latina 2014.

== Pageantry ==
=== Miss Universe Puerto Rico 2014 ===
Aleyda represented Bayamón at Miss Universe Puerto Rico 2014 on October 3, 2013, where she finished as 1st Runner-Up to Gabriela Berrios of Toa Baja. Being the 1st Runner-Up she was awarded the opportunity to represent Puerto Rico at Miss Intercontinental 2013.

=== Miss Intercontinental 2013 ===
Aleyda represented Puerto Rico at Miss Intercontinental 2013 where she finished as 1st Runner-Up. This was Puerto Rico's second consecutive placement as 1st Runner-Up as Ortiz' predecessor Génesis Dávila also placed 1st Runner-Up the previous year.

=== Nuestra Belleza Latina 2014 ===
Ortiz auditioned for Univision's reality show and beauty pageant Nuestra Belleza Latina 2014 in Miami and advanced to Round 2 where she was selected to be part of the 12 finalists who enter the mansion of Nuestra Belleza Latina. On May 18, 2014, Aleyda was declared the winner, becoming the third Puerto Rican to do so after Melissa Marty in 2008 and Vanessa De Roide in 2012. She was awarded $200,000 in prizes, a Kia Soul, a contract with Univision Network and appeared on the cover of Cosmopolitan en Español magazine. With her win Puerto Rico currently has the most Nuestra Belleza Latina wins.

=== Mira Quien Baila 2021 ===
She participated in Mira Quien Baila and she was the runner up with a good price for her charity that she dance for and many fans said she was robbed the win because the audience choose her as their winner while the judge pick Cheft as the winner.

== Personal life ==
From 2014 to 2015 Ortiz was in a relationship with Gabriel Valenzuela. In 2016, Ortiz began a relationship with financial adviser Ricardo Casanova. The couple became engaged in late 2018 and wed on March 22, 2019.

Awards and achievements
Preceded by (El Salvador) Marisela de Montecristo	Nuestra Belleza Latina; 2014	Succeeded by (Dominican Republic) Francisca Lachapel
Preceded by (Puerto Rico) Génesis Dávila	Miss Intercontinental 1st Runner-Up; 2013	Succeeded by (Cuba) Jeslie Mergal
Preceded by Génesis Dávila (Arroyo)	Miss Intercontinental Puerto Rico; 2013	Succeeded by Keysi Marie Vargas (Quebradillas)
Preceded by Génesis Dávila (Arroyo)	Miss Universe Puerto Rico 1st Runner-Up; 2014	Succeeded by Nivializ Pérez (Aguas Buenas)
Preceded by Stephanie Román	Miss Universe Bayamón; 2014	Succeeded by Valeria Torres
