= Osmel Sousa =

Venezuelan beauty pageant entrepreneur

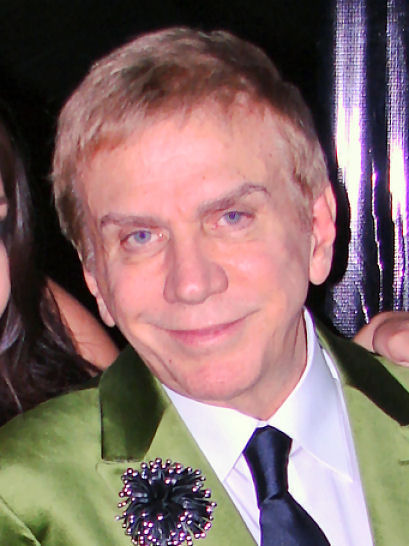
- Born: Osmel Ricardo Sousa Mansilla; 26 September 1946 (age 80); Rodas, Cuba
- Other name: The "Tzar" of Beauty
- Occupations: President of the Miss Venezuela pageant 1981 – 2018 (retired) National director of the Miss Universe Argentina pageant (2019-2021) and Uruguay (2019)

Osmel Ricardo Sousa Mansilla (born 26 September 1946) is a Cuban-Venezuelan beauty pageant entrepreneur, and the former president of the Miss Venezuela Organization.

Known for his career in both pageantry and advertising, Sousa has been called "The Tsar of Beauty" for his significant role in producing a number of beauty titles for Venezuela.

On 8 February 2018, Sousa announced his public intention to retire from the position and was ultimately succeeded by Gabriela Isler as national director for the Miss Venezuela pageant.

== Early life ==
Osmel Sousa was born in Rodas, a town in the province of Cienfuegos in Cuba. When he was thirteen, his family sent him to live with his grandmother in Maracaibo, Venezuela. After high school he studied with Horacio Peterson's acting company with Lupita Ferrer, Miguel Ángel Landa and Luis Abreu, but quickly realized that he was not cut out to be an actor. He then briefly held jobs as an advertising draftsman and art designer for the two large television networks in Venezuela, the state owned VTV and the cable network RCTV.

== Miss Venezuela ==
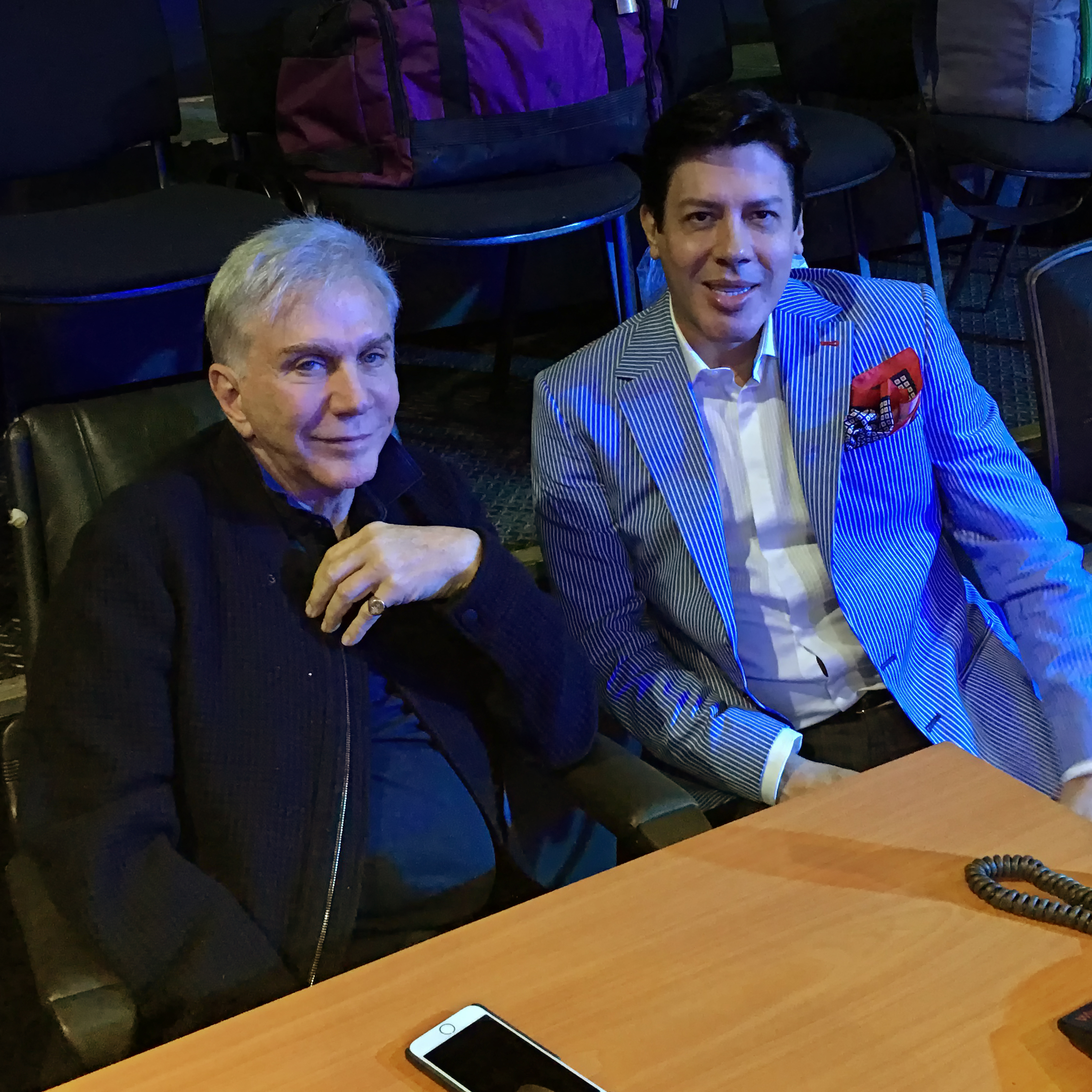
Osmel Sousa (Left) in 2016.

In 1969, Osmel Sousa went to work for the publicity company in charge of organizing the annual Miss Venezuela contest. He was assigned to work with the Venezuelan Committee of Beauty. Sousa continued working with that committee when, in 1970, Ignacio Font Coll reconstituted it as the OPPA Advertising Agency, which in turn was the predecessor of the actual Miss Venezuela Organization.

In the 1970s, Osmel Sousa undertook advising selected contestants, many of whom went on to win the Miss Venezuela crown, at the same time he started designing nightgowns for most of the contestants. His first success was Jeannette Donzella, who became Miss Venezuela in 1971.

In October 1981, Ignacio Font Coll died and Osmel Sousa became the president of the Miss Venezuela Organization. During his thirty-year career he has been considered to be the driving force behind the large number of Miss Venezuelas who go on to become Miss World, Miss Universe, Miss International and Miss Earth.

Tulio Hernandez, a Venezuelan sociologist, has called Sousa a Pygmalion, an artist who turns out talented and beautiful young women. To date, Venezuela has had seven Miss Universe titleholders, six Miss World winners, nine Miss International crowns, and two wins in Miss Earth, becoming the most successful pageant powerhouse in history.

In 2007, Sousa joined with Lupita Jones, a former Miss Universe (1991), and Carlos Calderón, emcee of "El Gordo y La Flaca", in judging Univision's Hispanic beauty contest Nuestra Belleza Latina.

On 6 February 2018, Sousa publicly announced his retirement from the Miss Venezuela organization after forty years of tenure.

== Mister Mundo ==
In 1996 he became the franchise manager for the Mister World for Venezuela; In 1998, he achieved his first success in this contest for male beauty, awarding the first title of Mister world to Venezuela, which was won by Sandro Finoglio.

== Miss Argentina ==
At the beginning of July 2019, Sousa announced, through his social networks, that he will assume the direction of the Miss Argentina beauty pageant.

== Controversies and legacy ==
Osmel Sousa has been involved in a number of controversies over the years, with everything from whether the color and style of dress that he picked was appropriate, to whether or not he advised plastic surgery for a particular contestant to the charge that he creates "fashion mannequins". In 1979, Maritza Sayalero was the first Venezuelan contestant to admit that she'd had plastic surgery. Sousa changed the way that the Miss Venezuela contestants achieved success and public attitudes on plastic surgery In Venezuela, and other countries plastic surgery received much more general acceptance and even became fashionable.

In recent years, Sousa has been also involved in several controversies related to same-sex marriage in Venezuela, by saying he's not only against it, but also against child adoption by same sex parents. He also has said in many occasions he was estranged by his parents, and consequently sent to Venezuela when he was only a teenager, and even put him on hormonal treatment to make him "manlier" due to his sexual orientation.
