= Miss Universe Puerto Rico 2014 =

59th Annual Miss Universe Puerto Rico pageant

- Date: October 3, 2013
- Presenters: Raymond Arrieta; Mayra Matos
- Venue: Luis A. Ferré Performing Arts Center, Santurce, Puerto Rico
- Broadcaster: Telemundo
- Entrants: 28
- Placements: 16
- Winner: Gabriela Berrios; Toa Baja
- Congeniality: María Isabel Vele, Camuy
- Best National Costume: Linoshka Marlene Castro González, Carolina
- Photogenic: Stephanie Soto, Añasco

Miss Universe Puerto Rico was the 59th Miss Universe Puerto Rico pageant, held at the Luis A. Ferré Performing Arts Center in Santurce, Puerto Rico, on October 3, 2013.

Monic Pérez of Arecibo crowned Gabriela Berrios of Toa Baja at the end of the event. Berrios represented Puerto Rico at Miss Universe 2014 on January 25, 2015 in Doral, Florida, United States, where she won the Miss Photogenic special awards but was unplaced.

== Results ==
=== Placements ===
Placement	Contestant
Miss Universe Puerto Rico 2014	Toa Baja – Gabriela Berrios
1st Runner-Up	Bayamón – Aleyda Ortiz
2nd Runner-Up	Añasco – Stephanie Soto
3rd Runner-Up	Juana Díaz – Alexandra Porrata
4th Runner-Up	Cayey – Patricia Quiñones
5th Runner-Up	Río Grande – Larissa Santiago
Top 12	Cabo Rojo – Zamira Mendoza; Carolina – Linoshka Marlene Castro; Cidra – Lourel Victoria Vivoni; Luquillo – María Rivera; San Juan – Larissa Dones; Yabucoa – Tershya Marie Soto
Top 16	Arecibo – Suzette Eunice Rivera; Camuy – María Isabel Vélez; Dorado – Kristhielee Caride; Orocovis – Irmalís Rodríguez

=== Miss Universe Puerto Rico 2014 Mall Tour ===
The delegates of the Miss Universe Puerto Rico 2014 edition, made a summer mall tour. During the tour the delegates competed on different mini competitions and presented Sears summer season clothes on the runway. The mall tour mini competition awards were given as follows:

Awards	Contestant
Best Auto-Presentation Award	Yabucoa - Tershya Soto
Sears Fashionista Award	Dorado - Kristhielee Caride
Miss Fitness	Cidra - Lourel Vivoni
Most Improvised Answer	Yabucoa - Tershya Soto
Payless Best Legs Award	Toa Baja - Gabriela Berrios
Hair TRESemmé	Ponce - Shantal Gonzalez; Río Grande - Larissa Santiago
Talent Show Award	Toa Baja - Gabriela Berrios

=== Gala de Premios (Special Awards Gala) ===
The Special Awards Gala took place on September 25, 2013 and the following awards were given:

Awards	Contestant
Best Body Award	Luquillo - María Rivera
Econo Altruistic Award	Añasco - Stephanie Soto
Caras Most Beautiful Face Award	Añasco - Stephanie Soto
Bloom Beauty Award	Caguas - Krystal De Jesús
TRESemmé Most Beautiful Hair Award	Cayey - Patricia Quiñones
Payless Best Catwalk Award	Toa Baja - Gabriela Berrios

These awards were given during the pageant on October 3:

Awards	Contestant
Miss Photogenic	Añasco - Stephanie Soto
Miss Congeniality	Camuy - María Isabel Vélez
Best National Costume	Carolina - Linoshka Castro
Miss Sears Style	Toa Baja - Gabriela Berrios

=== Best National Costume ===
Result	Contestant
Winner	Carolina - Linoshka Castro
2nd Place	Luquillo - María Rivera
3rd Place	Caguas - Krystal De Jesús
4th Place	Orocovis - Irmalís Rodríguez
5th Place	Río Grande - Larissa Santiago
6th Place	Ceiba - Krystal Lee Pérez
7th Place	Camuy - María Isabel Velez
8th Place	Yabucoa - Tershya Soto
9th Place	Cayey - Patricia Quiñones
10th Place	Juana Diaz - Alexandra Porrata

== Contestants ==
28 contestants competed for the title:

Municipality	Contestant	Age	Height	Hometown
Añasco	Stephanie Soto Ríos	17	1.73 m (5 ft 8 in)	Bayamón
Arecibo	Suzette Eunice Rivera Sanes	23	1.75 m (5 ft 9 in)	Arecibo
Bayamón	Aleyda Enid Ortiz Rodríguez	24	1.79 m (5 ft 10 1/2 in)	Bayamón
Cabo Rojo	Zamira Mendoza Morales	20	1.72 m (5 ft 7 1/2 in)	Cabo Rojo
Caguas	Krystal Marie De Jesús Nogueras	18	1.74 m (5 ft 8 1/2 in)	San Juan
Camuy	María Isabel Vélez González	22	1.68 m (5 ft 6 in)	Ponce
Carolina	Linoshka Marlene Castro González	22	1.70 m (5 ft 7 in)	Carolina
Cayey	Patricia Quiñones Negrón	24	1.78 m (5 ft 10 in)	Cayey
Ceiba	Krystal Lee Pérez Flores	21	1.73 m (5 ft 8 in)	Bayamón
Cidra	Lourel Victoria Vivoni Ortiz	21	1.75 m (5 ft 9 in)	San Juan
Dorado	Kristhielee Yinaira Caride Santiago	22	1.75 m (5 ft 9 in)	Ponce
Fajardo	Julimar Terie Santiago Rivera	18	1.73 m (5 ft 8 in)	Fajardo
Hatillo	Carla Michelle Harrison Canals	25	1.70 m (5 ft 7 in)	San Juan
Juana Diaz	Alexandra Porrata Montalvo	19	1.85 m (6 ft 1 in)	Juana Diaz
Luquillo	María Rivera García	26	1.69 m (5 ft 6 1/2 in)	San Juan
Mayagüez	Alexandra Ninoshka Alemañy Ojeda	17	1.68 m (5 ft 6 in)	Mayagüez
Morovis	Luz Johanna Rivera Collazo	25	1.68 m (5 ft 6 in)	Morovis
Orocovis	Irmalís Rodríguez Figueroa	25	1.77 m (5 ft 9 1/2 in)	San Juan
Ponce	Shantal Yaniré González Peña	18	1.75 m (5 ft 9 in)	Ponce
Río Grande	Larissa Santiago Escazo	22	1.77 m (5 ft 9 1/2 in)	San Juan
Salinas	Natacha Marie Romero Correa	19	1.69 m (5 ft 6 1/2 in)	Salinas
San Juan	Larissa Dones Rosario	17	1.79 m (5 ft 10 1/2 in)	San Juan
Toa Alta	Ethelin Tort Santiago	25	1.68 m (5 ft 6 in)	Mayagüez
Toa Baja	Gabriela Berríos Pagán	23	1.76 m (5 ft 9 1/2 in)	San Juan
Trujillo Alto	Diandra Janisse Nieves Morengo	23	1.71 m (5 ft 7 1/2 in)	Trujillo Alto
Utuado	Natalie Maldonado Montalvo	24	1.70 m (5 ft 7 in)	Utuado
Vega Alta	Weadaleth Albarrán Ortiz	19	1.73 m (5 ft 8 in)	Vega Alta
Yabucoa	Tershya Marie Soto Morales	21	1.74 m (5 ft 8 1/2 in)	Yabucoa

== Notes ==
- Miss Toa Baja, Gabriela Berrios, competed at Miss Universe Puerto Rico 2012 as Toa Alta and finished as 2nd runner-up. She also competed at Miss Supranational 2012 and finished in Top 10.
- Miss Bayamón, Aleyda Ortiz, later placed 1st runner-up at Miss Intercontinental 2013 and later competed at Nuestra Belleza Latina 2014 where she became the third Puerto Rican woman to be crowned Nuestra Belleza Latina.
- Miss Carolina, Linoshka Castro, was Miss Turismo Latino 2011. She also competed at Miss Earth Puerto Rico 2011 where she placed 2nd runner-up.
- Miss Cayey, Patricia Quiñones, competed at Miss Puerto Rico Universe 2009 representing Rio Grande. She placed in Top 10. She later won the title of Miss Puerto Rico International 2014 and was to represent the island at Miss International 2014 before withdrawing for personal reasons. Her 1st Runner-Up, Valerie Hernandez, took her place at the pageant where she was crowned the winner.
- Miss Arecibo, Suzette Rivera, represented Puerto Rico at Reina Hispanoamericana 2013 where she placed 4th runner-up.
- Miss Hatillo, Carla Harrison, competed at Miss Mundo de Puerto Rico 2009 representing Camuy. She placed in Top 12.
- Miss Yabucoa, Tershya Soto, competed at Nuestra Belleza Latina 2013. She placed in Top 20 semi-finalists.
- Miss Río Grande, Larissa Santiago, would later represent Puerto Rico at Miss Supranational 2017 where she finished as 4th Runner-Up and later went on to compete at Miss Universe Puerto Rico 2018 representing Fajardo where she finished in the Top 6.
- Miss Luquillo, Maria Rivera, competed at Miss Universe Puerto Rico 2013 representing Guaynabo. She didn't classify.
- Miss Dorado, Kristhielee Caride, would later compete at Miss Universe Puerto Rico 2016 representing Isabela where she won and was represent Puerto Rico at Miss Universe 2016 until her dethronement on March 17, 2016. She was replaced by 1st Runner-Up Brenda Jiménez who represented the island at Miss Universe 2016 in Manila, Philippines where she failed to place in the Top 13.
- Miss Salinas, Natacha Romero, would later compete at Miss Universe Puerto Rico 2017 representing Guayama where she finished in the Top 10.

=== Historical significance ===
- Toa Baja won Miss Universe Puerto Rico for the first time.
- The following municipalities also made the semi-finals last year were Arecibo, Cayey, Orocovis, and Toa Baja.
- Toa Baja placed for the fifth consecutive year.
- Cayey placed for the third consecutive year.
- Luquillo last placed in 2000.
- Cidra last placed in 2004.
- Añasco last placed in 2006.
- Cabo Rojo last placed in 2009.
- Dorado and Juana Diaz last placed in 2010.
- Bayamón and San Juan last placed in 2011.
- Camuy, Carolina, Río Grande, and Yabucoa last placed in 2012.
- Gabriela Berrios is the first Miss Universe Puerto Rico since Uma Blasini to win the competition after placing runner-up a previous year. Blasini placed 4th runner-up in 2005 and won in 2007. She is also the fifth consecutive winner of Miss Universe Puerto Rico to also win the Payless Best Catwalk Award.

Preceded by {{{before}}}	Miss Universe Puerto Rico; 2014	Succeeded by 2015
