= Miss Universe Puerto Rico 2015 =

- Date: October 9, 2014
- Presenters: Raymond Arrieta; Alexandra Fuentes; Monic Pérez
- Venue: Centro Ferial Juan H. Cintrón, Ponce, Puerto Rico
- Broadcaster: WKAQ-TV
- Entrants: 45
- Placements: 20
- Winner: Catalina Morales; Guaynabo
- Congeniality: Elinnette Rodríguez, Yauco
- Best National Costume: Heilymar Rosario, San Juan
- Photogenic: Nivializ Pérez, Aguas Buenas

Miss Universe Puerto Rico 2015 was the 60th Miss Universe Puerto Rico pageant, held at the Centro Ferial Juan H. Cintrón in Ponce, Puerto Rico, on October 9, 2014.

Gabriela Berrios of Toa Baja crowned Catalina Morales of Guaynabo at the end of the event. Morales represented Puerto Rico at the Miss Universe 2015 pageant, where she was unplaced.

== Results ==
=== Placements ===
Placement	Contestant
Miss Universe Puerto Rico 2015	Guaynabo – Catalina Morales
1st Runner-Up	Aguas Buenas – Nivializ Pérez
2nd Runner-Up	Cayey – Nicole Marie Colón
3rd Runner-Up	Humacao – Stephanie Cruz
4th Runner-Up	Mayagüez – Alina Teresa Román
5th Runner-Up	Utuado – Brenda Paola Hernández
Top 12	Adjuntas – Karol Maryorie Ayala; Añasco – Andrea Nicole Mercado; Arecibo – Perla del Mar Matos; Bayamón – Valeria Torres; Lares – Melanie Rivera; Salinas – Wilmary Monción Román
Top 20	Caguas – Josmarie Soto; Camuy – Lorena Segarra Rancel; Coamo - María Elis Rodríguez; Dorado – Rayza Merari Rivera; Las Marías – Nobiraida Zoet Infante; Las Piedras – Valeria Ivelisse Rivera; Ponce – Frances Cintrón; San Germán – Paola Campos

=== Gala de Premios (Special Awards Gala) ===
The Special Awarda Gala took place on October 1, 2014 and the following awards were given:

Awards	Contestant
Best Body Award	Cataño - Zuania Velez
Miss Sears Fashionista Style	Salinas - Wilmary Moncion
Caras Most Beautiful Face Award	Humacao - Stephanie Cruz
Bloom Beauty Award	Aguas Buenas - Nivializ Perez
TRESemmé Most Beautiful Hair Award	Guaynabo - Catalina Morales
Bakers Best Catwalk/Legs Award	Cayey - Nicole Colon

Also, the Hotel Melia in Ponce, chose six contestants that will be the official image of the hotel of their new publicity. The chosen contestants were: Miss Cayey (Nicole Colon), Miss Guaynabo (Catalina Morales), Miss Humacao (Stephanie Cruz), Miss Aguas Buenas (Nivializ Perez), Miss Mayaguez (Alina Roman), and Miss Ponce (Frances Cintron).

These awards were given during the final night of the pageant on October 9:

Awards	Contestant
Miss Photogenic	Aguas Buenas – Nivializ Pérez
Miss Congeniality	Yauco - Elinnette Rodríguez
Best National Costume	San Juan - Heilymar Rosario

=== Best National Costume ===
The Top 10 for Best National Costume were announced on September 8, 2014 during the Trajes de Tipico (Best National Costume) event. The winner and runners-up were announced during the pageant on October 9, 2014.

Results	Contestant
Winner	San Juan - Heilymar Rosario
2nd Place	Dorado - Rayza Rivera
3rd Place	Salinas - Wilmary Monción
4th Place	Arecibo - Perla Del Mar
5th Place	Lajas - Itzaira Velez
6th Place	Guaynabo - Catalina Morales
7th Place	Cayey - Nicole Colón
8th Place	Camuy - Lorena Segarra
9th Place	Utuado - Brenda Hernández
10th Place	Añasco - Andrea Mercado

== Contestants ==
45 contestants competed for the title:

Municipality	Contestant	Age	Height	Hometown
Adjuntas	Karol Maryorie Ayala Arroyo	19	1.70 m (5 ft 7 in)	Adjuntas
Aguada	Lourdes Villarrubia Varela	21	1.75 m (5 ft 9 in)	Aguada
Aguadilla	Natalie Marrero Aponte	19	1.73 m (5 ft 8 in)	Aguadilla
Aguas Buenas	Nivializ Pérez Hernández	21	1.78 m (5 ft 10 in)	San Juan
Añasco	Andrea Nicole Mercado Egipciaco	18	1.73 m (5 ft 8 in)	Bayamón
Arecibo	Perla Del Mar Matos Rodríguez	19	1.75 m (5 ft 9 in)	Arecibo
Barceloneta	Yanelis Urbistondo Gómez	22	1.73 m (5 ft 8 in)	San Juan
Bayamón	Valeria Torres Vélez	22	1.71 m (5 ft 7 1/2 in)	Bayamón
Cabo Rojo	Paola Andrea González Cabrera	18	1.68 m (5 ft 6 in)	Cabo Rojo
Caguas	Josmarie Soto Mercado	19	1.70 m (5 ft 7 in)	San Juan
Camuy	Lorena Segarra Rancel	19	1.73 m (5 ft 8 in)	Ponce
Cataño	Zuania Emali Vélez Castro	19	1.65 m (5 ft 5 in)	San Juan
Cayey	Nicole Marie Colón Rivera	21	1.74 m (5 ft 8 1/2 in)	Cayey
Cidra	Yara Lynnette Cid Borrero	22	1.68 m (5 ft 6 in)	San Juan
Coamo	María Elis Rodríguez Irizarry	17	1.68 m (5 ft 6 in)	Ponce
Corozal	Wallis Nannette Rosa Bobe	25	1.75 m (5 ft 9 in)	Corozal
Dorado	Rayza Merari Rivera Fernández	24	1.74 m (5 ft 8 1/2 in)	Dorado
Guánica	Paulina Victoria Palerm	20	1.78 m (5 ft 10 in)	Ponce
Guayanilla	Syndie Berríos Orengo	22	1.65 m (5 ft 5 in)	Guayanilla
Guaynabo	Catalina Morales Gómez	24	1.76 m (5 ft 9 1/2 in)	Guaynabo
Gurabo	Giovanna Raquel López	23	1.73 m (5 ft 8 in)	Bayamón
Hormigueros	Keidelyn Morales Castillo	17	1.65 m (5 ft 5 in)	Mayagüez
Humacao	Stephanie Cruz	19	1.74 m (5 ft 8 1/2 in)	Humacao
Isabela	Nashalie Rodríguez Franco	18	1.73 m (5 ft 8 in)	Isabela
Juana Díaz	Leira Ivette González Santiago	24	1.75 m (5 ft 9 in)	Juana Díaz
Juncos	Lyshne T. Torres Sotomayor	21	1.73 m (5 ft 8 in)	San Juan
Lajas	Itzaira Vélez Pardo	23	1.73 m (5 ft 8 in)	Lajas
Lares	Melanie Rivera Ruiz	23	1.72 m (5 ft 7 1/2 in)	Cayey
Las Marías	Nobiraida Zoet Infante Bosques	24	1.78 m (5 ft 10 in)	Las Marías
Las Piedras	Valeria Ivelisse Rivera Smith	25	1.73 m (5 ft 8 in)	Las Piedras
Maricao	Ninoshka Isabel Gabrielini Pérez	22	1.73 m (5 ft 8 in)	Maricao
Mayagüez	Alina Teresa Román Hubers	19	1.77 m (5 ft 9 1/2 in)	Mayagüez
Moca	Anaira González Hernández	20	1.78 m (5 ft 10 in)	Moca
Peñuelas	Marelys Santos Flores	27	1.65 m (5 ft 5 in)	Ponce
Ponce	Frances Cintrón González	19	1.73 m (5 ft 8 in)	Ponce
Rincón	Pamela Ruiz Babilonia	23	1.73 m (5 ft 8 in)	San Juan
Salinas	Wilmary Monción Román	23	1.72 m (5 ft 7 1/2 in)	Salinas
San Germán	Paola Campos Latorre	19	1.73 m (5 ft 8 in)	San Germán
San Sebastián	Mirelis Mercado Arocho	19	1.75 m (5 ft 9 in)	Bayamón
Santa Isabel	Jailene Enid Santiago Martínez	20	1.73 m (5 ft 8 in)	Santa Isabel
Toa Alta	Karla Sofia Rodríguez Rivera	21	1.70 m (5 ft 7 in)	San Juan
Utuado	Brenda Paola Hernández Santiago	19	1.73 m (5 ft 8 in)	Utuado
Villalba	Juleimy Rentas Bermúdez	17	1.69 m (5 ft 6 1/2 in)	Ponce
Yabucoa	Dinora Ruiz Arroyo	24	1.73 m (5 ft 8 in)	San Juan
Yauco	Elinnette Rodríguez Calderín	19	1.60 m (5 ft 3 in)	Yauco

== See also ==
- Miss Puerto Rico

== Notes ==
- The pageant originally consisted of 51 contestants but Miss Sabana Grande (Perla Aquino), Miss Guayama (Hilda Rivera), Miss Carolina (Ashley Ruiz), Miss Hatillo (Tania Soto), Miss Quebradillas (Keysi Marie Vargas), and Miss San Juan (Heilymar Rosario) withdrew for various reasons, dropping the number of contestants to 45.
- Miss Carolina, Ashley Ruiz, previously competed at Miss Universe Puerto Rico 2010 representing Rincón where she finished in Top 10. She also competed at Miss International Puerto Rico 2012 where she won the title.
- Miss Cayey, Nicole Colón, previously competed at Miss Pan American International 2012 where she won the title.
- Miss Gurabo, Giovanna López, previously competed at Miss Universe Puerto Rico 2011 representing San Lorenzo but failed to place in semi-finals.
- Miss Lajas, Itzaira Vélez, previously competed at Miss Universe Puerto Rico 2011 representing Lajas but failed to place in semi-finals.
- Miss Lares, Melanie Rivera Ruíz, previously competed at Miss Puerto Rico Teen 2010 where she won the title.
- Miss Quebradillas, Keysi Marie Vargas, withdrew from the competition after being appointed to represent Puerto Rico in Miss Intercontinental 2014 in Germany.
- Miss San Juan, Heilymar Rosario, withdrew from the competition for medical reasons after developing severe pneumonia being hospitalized for almost three weeks. She would later compete the following year at Miss Universe Puerto Rico 2016 where she finished as 2nd Runner-Up. Additionally she represented Puerto Rico at Miss Intercontinental 2016 where she won the title. She later competed at Miss Universe Puerto Rico 2021 representing Toa Baja where she finished in the Top 5.

=== Historical significance ===
- Guaynabo won Miss Universe Puerto Rico for the fifth time, the last time was Zoribel Fonalledas in 2000.
- The following municipalities also made the semi-finals last year were Añasco, Arecibo, Bayamón, Camuy, Cayey, and Dorado.
- Cayey placed for the fourth consecutive year as well as the Top 5 for the third consecutive year.
- Coamo and San Germán last placed in 2007.
- Caguas and Salinas last placed in 2009.
- Las Marías and Utuado last placed in 2010.
- Guaynabo and Ponce last placed in 2011.
- Adjuntas, Aguas Buenas, Humacao, Lares, Las Píedras, and Mayagüez last placed in 2013.

Preceded by {{{before}}}	Miss Universe Puerto Rico; 2015	Succeeded by 2016
