= Catalina Morales =

Beauty pageant titleholder

- Born: Catalina Morales Gómez; December 11, 1990 (age 35); Medellín, Colombia
- Education: University of Puerto Rico, Río Piedras Campus (BA); University of Puerto Rico School of Law (JD)
- Height: 1.75 m (5 ft 9 in)
- Beauty pageant titleholder
- Title: Miss Gurabo Mundo 2011; Miss Guaynabo Universe 2015; Miss Universe Puerto Rico 2015
- Hair color: Brown
- Eye color: Brown
- Major competitions: Miss World Puerto Rico 2011 (Top 12); Miss Universe Puerto Rico 2015 (Winner); Miss Universe 2015 (Unplaced)

Catalina Morales Gómez (born December 11, 1990) is a Colombian-born Puerto Rican actress, TV host, model and beauty pageant titleholder who was crowned Miss Universe Puerto Rico 2015. She represented Puerto Rico at Miss Universe 2015, where she was unplaced. In 2021, Morales appeared on season 25 of The Bachelor.

Outside of her career in entertainment and television, Morales is also a practicing attorney, who works in business and entertainment law in New York City.

== Early life and education ==
Morales was born in Medellín. When she was six months old, the family left Colombia and settled in Guaynabo, Puerto Rico. She attended Colegio Católico Notre Dame in Caguas, later graduating with a 4.0 GPA. Afterwards, she enrolled in the University of Puerto Rico, Río Piedras Campus, graduating magna cum laude with a bachelor's degree in advertising and public relations. After taking a year off from school to care for her terminally ill father, she enrolled in the University of Puerto Rico School of Law, and graduated with a Juris Doctor degree in 2017.

== Pageantry ==
Morales began her career in pageantry in 2008, when she was selected to represent Puerto Rico at Miss Italia nel Mondo 2008, a pageant for women belonging to the Italian diaspora. She did not place in the pageant. Morales returned to pageantry three years afterwards, when she represented Gurabo in the Miss World Puerto Rico 2011 competition, placing in the top twelve.

In 2015, Morales was selected to represent Guaynabo at the Miss Universe Puerto Rico 2015 competition. The competition was held in Ponce, Puerto Rico on October 9, 2014, and Morales went on to be crowned the winner. During her reign, she wrote a book chronicling her father's battle and subsequent death from terminal lung cancer. As Miss Universe Puerto Rico, she represented Puerto Rico at Miss Universe 2015 in Las Vegas, Nevada, where she went unplaced. Her reign as Miss Universe Puerto Rico ended after she crowned Kristhielee Caride as her successor the following year.

== Television ==
In July 2015, Morales began hosting her own television segment "Catalina's Universe" on the program Viva la tarde, aired on WAPA-TV. Her work with WAPA-TV ended in August 2016.

In October 2020, Morales was announced as one of the 43 women shortlisted as a possible competitor for season 25 of The Bachelor. She later was part of the group of five women who joined the show during episode four, aired January 25, 2021. Morales was eliminated in the following episode, aired February 1.

Awards and achievements
| Preceded by Gabriela Berríos (Toa Baja) | Miss Universe Puerto Rico; 2015 | Succeeded by Kristhielee Caride (Isabela) (Dethroned); Brenda Jiménez (Aguadilla) (Successor) |
| Preceded by María Rivera | Miss Guaynabo Universe; 2015 | Succeeded by Alejandra Rosario |
