= Miss Perú 1975 =

- Date: June 25, 1975
- Sponsor: Gente Magazine
- Entrants: 23
- Winner: Lourdes Berninzon; Lima Region

The Miss Peru Pageant was reinstated in 1975 and the winner was chosen by votes of readers of Gente Magazine (the official sponsor of the pageant).

That year, 23 candidates were competing for the 3 national crowns. The chosen winner represented Peru at the Miss Universe 1975, Miss World 1975, and Miss Ambar 1975. The rest of the finalists would enter in different pageants.

== Placement ==
Final Results	Contestant
Miss Peru Universe 1975	Region Lima - Lourdes Berninzon
Miss World Peru 1975	Distrito Capital – Mary Orfanides
Miss Ambar Peru 1975	Huancavelica - Mary Ann Franco
Miss Maja Peru 1975	Ancash - María Julia Fortunic
1st Runner-Up	Junín - Rocío Lazcano
2nd Runner-Up	Cajamarca - María Isabel Frías
Top 10	Madre de Dios - Luisa Malatesta; San Martín - Dina Carrera; Piura - Liliana Castaneda; Moquegua - Patricia Céspedes

== Special awards ==
- Best Regional Costume - Áncash - María Julia Fortunic
- Miss Photogenic - Lambayeque - Francis Armendáriz
- Miss Body - San Martin - Dina Carrera
- Miss Congeniality - Callao - Myriam Llosa
- Miss Elegance - Piura - Liliana Castaneda
- Most Beautiful Face - Region Lima - Lourdes Berninzon

.

== Contestants ==
- Amazonas - Carmen Lelis Wright
- Áncash - María Julia Fortunic Prado
- Cajamarca - María Isabel Frías Román
- Callao - Myriam Llosa Calderón
- Cuzco - Ada Millares Vriett
- Distrito Capital - Mary Orfanides Helmberg
- Europe Perú - Llubica Barkovich Čazporkots
- Huancavelica - Mary Ann Franco Liubetti
- Huánuco - Viviana Ezeta Rodríguez
- Ica - Susy Marie Brescia Corvall
- Junín - Rocío Ana Lazcano
- La Libertad - Lidya María Solezzi
- Lambayeque - Francisca Armendáriz Piedrahita
- Loreto - Susy Molgora Seminario
- Madre de Dios - Luisa Malatesta Wolff
- Moquegua - Patricia Céspedes La Torre
- Pasco - Pilar Galindo Mujica
- Piura - Liliana Castaneda Estrada
- Puno - Nancy Luly Tan Jun Jumpi
- Region Lima - Lourdes Berninzon
- San Martín - Dina Carrera Caballero
- Tacna - Maricarmen Villar Herrera
- Tumbes - Carmen Olaechea Normundini
