= Goyco =

Goyco is a Hispanic name that may refer to the following notable people:

- Sergio Goycochea (born 1963), Argentine football goalkeeper known as El Goyco
- Ana Nisi Goyco (1951–2019), Puerto Rican politician
- Charytín Goyco, Dominican singer, television hostess and actress
