= Miss World Puerto Rico 2013 =

Annual beauty competition

- Date: April 24, 2013
- Presenters: Braulio Castillo; Yara LaSanta; Madelyn Ortiz
- Venue: Guaynabo School of Fine Arts Theatre, Guaynabo, Puerto Rico
- Broadcaster: Univision Puerto Rico (WLII-DT)
- Entrants: 21
- Placements: 13
- Winner: Nadyalee Torres; Caguas

Miss World Puerto Rico 2013 was the 40th Miss World Puerto Rico pageant, held at the Guaynabo School of Fine Arts Theatre in Guaynabo, Puerto Rico, on April 24, 2013.

Janelee Chaparro of Barceloneta crowned Nadyalee Torres of Caguas as her successor at the end of the event. Torres represented Puerto Rico at Miss World 2013 which was held at Bali Nusa Dua Convention Center in South Kuta, Bali, Indonesia on September 28, 2013.

== Results ==
=== Placements ===
Placement	Contestant
Miss World Puerto Rico 2013	Caguas – Nadyalee Torres López
1st Runner-Up	Toa Baja – Franceska Toro
2nd Runner-Up	Bayamón – Carol Rigual
Top 5	Río Grande – Génesis Concepción; San Juan – Kiara Morales
Top 13	Cidra – Gabriela Rodríguez; Coamo – Hilda Rivera; Fajardo – Marie Santana; Guaynabo – Giannilys Bergollo; Peñuelas – Layla Velázquez; Toa Alta – Naneishka Marrero Nieves; Trujillo Alto – Karimar Quiñones; Yauco – Luisa Raquel Sotero

=== Special awards ===
Award	Contestant
Miss Beach Beauty	Bayamón – Carol Rigual
Beauty with a Purpose	Peñuelas – Layla Velázquez
Miss Sports	Toa Baja – Franceska Toro
Miss Talent	Caguas – Nadyalee Torres
Miss Top Model	Toa Baja – Franceska Toro

== Contestants ==
Official 21 candidates of Miss World Puerto Rico 2013:

- Barceloneta - Nerlene Rosado
- Bayamón - Carol Rigual
- Caguas - Nadyalee Torres López
- Canóvanas - Leishla Díaz
- Carolina - Cristina Olivieri
- Cidra - Gabriela Rodríguez
- Coamo - Hilda Rivera
- Corozal - Nathaly F. Ferreira Garcia
- Fajardo - Marie Santana
- Guaynabo - Giannilys Bergollo
- Hatillo - Joselyne Arce
- Lajas - Lualmarie Serrano
- Mayagüez - Nicole Nazario
- Peñuelas - Layla N. Velázquez Rivera
- Río Grande - Génesis Concepción
- San Juan - Kiara Morales
- Santa Isabel - Merelyn Soto
- Toa Alta - Naneishka Marrero Nieves
- Toa Baja - Franceska Toro
- Trujillo Alto - Karimar Quiñones Algarín
- - Yauco - Luisa Raquel Sotero
