= Miss World Puerto Rico 2014 =

Miss Mundo 2014

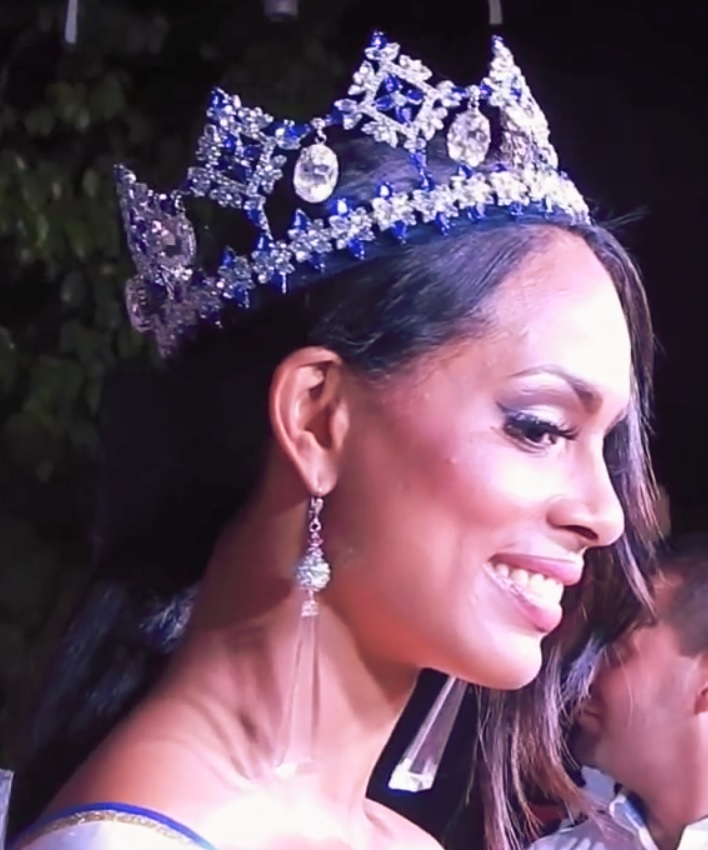
- Génesis Dávila, Miss World Puerto Rico 2014
- Date: August 13, 2014
- Presenters: Braulio Castillo Jr.; Aleyda Ortiz; Jennifer Colón; Alejandro Chabán; Gredmarie Colón
- Entertainment: Jencarlos Canela; DJ King Arthur; Yandel; Pedro Capó
- Venue: Guaynabo School of Fine Arts Theatre, Guaynabo, Puerto Rico
- Broadcaster: Univision Puerto Rico (WLII-DT)
- Entrants: 22
- Placements: 11
- Winner: Génesis Dávila; Arroyo

Miss World Puerto Rico 2014 was the 41st Miss World Puerto Rico pageant, held at the Guaynabo School of Fine Arts Theatre in Guaynabo, Puerto Rico, on August 13, 2014.

Nadyalee Torres of Caguas crowned Génesis Dávila of Arroyo as her successor at the end of the event. Dávila represented Puerto Rico at Miss World 2014 which was held at ExCeL London in London, England, United Kingdom on December 14, 2014.

== Results ==
=== Placements ===
Placement	Contestant
Miss World Puerto Rico 2014	Arroyo – Génesis María Dávila Pérez
1st Runner-Up	Toa Baja – Franceska Toro
2nd Runner-Up	Dorado – Rebeca Valentín
Top 6	Canóvanas – Shalymar Otero; Ponce – Darli Arni Pacheco; Yabucoa – Tershya Soto
Top 11	Adjuntas – Wilmarie Rosado; Isabela – Dalmar Ramos; Luquillo – Jehanna López; Orocovis – Jelianie Hernández; San Juan – Laura Irizarry

=== Special awards ===
Award	Contestant
Miss Beach Beauty	Arroyo – Génesis Dávila
Beauty with a Purpose	Orocovis – Jelianie Hernández
Miss Sports	Dorado – Rebeca Valentín
Miss Talent	Ponce – Darli Arni Pacheco
Miss Top Model	Dorado – Rebeca Valentín

== Contestants ==
Official 22 candidates of Miss World Puerto Rico 2014:

- Adjuntas - Wilmarie Rosado
- Arroyo - Génesis María Dávila Pérez
- Bayamón - Sherly Rivera
- Caguas - Lety Pérez
- Canóvanas - Shalymar Otero
- Carolina - Kassandra Meléndez
- Dorado - Rebeca Valentín
- Guayama - Génesis Santiago
- Guaynabo - Gabriela Pérez
- Gurabo - Noelia Hernández
- Isabela - Dalmar Ramos
- Juana Díaz - Sherlin Aguirre
- Juncos - Anne Alvarado
- Lajas - Julissanet Cruz
- Loíza - Cinderee Cruz
- Luquillo - Jehanna López
- Orocovis - Jelianie Hernández
- Ponce - Darli Arni Pacheco
- Río Grande - Lyannelys Rodríguez
- San Juan - Laura Irizarry
- Toa Baja - Franceska Toro
- Yabucoa - Tershya Soto
