= Miss Universe Puerto Rico 2013 =

58th annual Miss Universe Puerto Rico pageant held in Santurce, San Juan, Puerto Rico

- Date: August 29, 2012
- Presenters: Raymond Arrieta; Alexandra Fuentes; Mayra Matos; Viviana Ortiz
- Venue: Luis A. Ferré Performing Arts Center, Santurce, Puerto Rico
- Broadcaster: Telemundo
- Entrants: 32
- Placements: 16
- Winner: Monic Marie Pérez; Arecibo
- Congeniality: Yubelkis Inocencia Paredes Valdez; Trujillo Alto
- Best National Costume: Yanitza Marisol Rivera; Loíza
- Photogenic: Monic Marie Pérez; Arecibo

Miss Universe Puerto Rico 2013 was the 58th Annual Miss Universe Puerto Rico pageant, held at the Centro de Bellas Artes de Santurce in San Juan, Puerto Rico, on August 29, 2012.

Bodine Koehler of Río Grande crowned Monic Marie Pérez of Arecibo at the end of the event. Pérez represented Puerto Rico at Miss Universe 2013 on November 9, 2013 in Moscow, and placed in the Top 16.

Also, the contestants from Puerto Rico for the Miss Intercontinental 2013, Miss Supranational 2013, Miss Continente Americano 2013, and Top Model of the World Puerto Rico 2013 competitions were chosen.

== Results ==
=== Placements ===
Placement	Contestant
Miss Universe Puerto Rico 2013	Arecibo – Monic Marie Pérez
1st Runner-Up	Arroyo – Génesis María Dávila
2nd Runner-Up	Cayey – Desirée del Rio
3rd Runner-Up	Mayagüez – Cristina María Franceschini
4th Runner-Up	Orocovis – Amanda Ortiz
Top 10	Canóvanas – Nicole de Jesús; Fajardo – Patricia Corcino; Humacao – Roselyn Yarelis Acosta; Rincón – Giselle Marie Negrón; Toa Alta – Ariana Karina Díaz
Top 16	Adjuntas – Laura Irizarry; Aguas Buenas – Angélica Sofía Vázquez; Corozal – María Nelly Vicioso; Lares – Jerrica Lee Rivera; Las Piedras – Idaliz Pedraza; Toa Baja – Marla Samarie Delgado

=== Appointment ===
The contestants from Puerto Rico for the Miss Intercontinental 2013, Miss Supranational 2013, Miss Continente Americano 2013, and Top Model of the World Puerto Rico 2013 competitions were chosen.

Title	Contestant
Miss Intercontinental Puerto Rico 2013	Arroyo – Génesis Dávila
Miss Supranational Puerto Rico 2013	Cayey – Desirée del Rio
Miss Continente Americano Puerto Rico 2013	Mayagüez – Cristina María Franceschini
Top Model of World Puerto Rico 2013	Orocovis – Amanda Ortiz

== Contestants ==
32 contestants competed for the title:

Municipality	Contestant	Age	Height	Hometown
Adjuntas	Laura Irizarry Montañez	21	1.78 m (5 ft 10 in)	Adjuntas
Aguas Buenas	Angélica Sofía Vázquez Lozada	19	1.75 m (5 ft 9 in)	Guaynabo
Aibonito	Marielasofía Pennet Jordan	22	1.75 m (5 ft 9 in)	Aibonito
Arecibo	Monic Marie Pérez Díaz	22	1.78 m (5 ft 10 in)	Arecibo
Arroyo	Génesis María Dávila Pérez	19	1.81 m (5 ft 11 1/2 in)	Arroyo
Bayamón	Stephanie Román De León	19	1.84 m (6 ft 1/2 in)	Bayamón
Caguas	Kristtal Marie Cruz Nieves	21	1.73 m (5 ft 8 in)	Bayamón
Canóvanas	Nicole De Jesús Andino	19	1.79 m (5 ft 10 1/2 in)	Bayamón
Carolina	Janyll Cintrón Torres	25	1.68 m (5 ft 6 in)	Carolina
Cataño	Karina Rosalba Núñez Cintrón	20	1.68 m (5 ft 6 in)	San Juan
Cayey	Desireé Del Río De Jesús	25	1.76 m (5 ft 9 1/2 in)	San Juan
Corozal	María Nelly Vicioso Martínez	23	1.78 m (5 ft 10 in)	San Juan
Dorado	María Alejandra Feliciano Jimenez	19	1.74 m (5 ft 8 1/2 in)	Bayamón
Fajardo	Patricia Corcino Pérez	24	1.69 m (5 ft 6 1/2 in)	Bayamón
Guaynabo	María Licell Rivera Doreo	25	1.68 m (5 ft 6 in)	Bayamón
Humacao	Roselyn Yarelis Acosta Ortega	19	1.80 m (5 ft 11 in)	Bayamón
Jayuya	Tessy Inez Liddell Acevedo	21	1.78 m (5 ft 10 in)	Bayamón
Lares	Jerrica Lee Rivera Rivera	21	1.75 m (5 ft 9 in)	Bayamón
Las Piedras	Idaliz Pedraza Izquierdo	20	1.73 m (5 ft 8 in)	San Juan
Loíza	Yanitza Marisol Rivera Rivera	26	1.68 m (5 ft 6 in)	Loíza
Luquillo	Marina Vega Berti	21	1.73 m (5 ft 8 in)	Luquillo
Mayagüez	Cristina María Franceschini Sánchez	20	1.75 m (5 ft 9 in)	Mayagüez
Orocovis	Amanda Ortíz Rosado	23	1.87 m (6 ft 1 1/2 in)	Orocovis
Patillas	Marlene Cruz García	22	1.71 m (5 ft 7 1/2 in)	Bayamón
Ponce	Catherine Irizarry Zayas	20	1.68 m (5 ft 6 in)	Ponce
Rincón	Giselle Marie Negrón Coro	24	1.73 m (5 ft 8 in)	San Juan
San Juan	Andrea Rivera Ayala	19	1.70 m (5 ft 7 in)	San Juan
San Sebastián	Bárbara Fernández Báez	21	1.75 m (5 ft 9 in)	Bayamón
Toa Alta	Ariana Karina Díaz Díaz	21	1.74 m (5 ft 8 1/2 in)	San Juan
Toa Baja	Marla Samarie Delgado Adorno	20	1.73 m (5 ft 8 in)	San Juan
Trujillo Alto	Yubelkis Inocencia Paredes Valdez	26	1.68 m (5 ft 6 in)	Trujillo Alto
Yauco	Natalia Marie Leyva Lezcano	21	1.73 m (5 ft 8 in)	Ponce

== Notes ==
- Miss Arroyo, Genesis Davila, later competed at Miss Mundo de Puerto Rico 2014 representing Arroyo where she won the title and represented Puerto Rico at Miss World 2014.
- Miss Bayamón, Stephanie Román, competed at Miss Universe Puerto Rico 2011 representing Bayamón. She finished as 1st runner-up. She competed at Miss Continente Americano 2011 but didn't qualify and later represented Dorado at Miss Universe Puerto Rico 2016 where she finished as 5th Runner-Up. Additionally she competed at Miss Mundo de Puerto Rico 2016 where she finished as 1st Runner-Up. She later assumed the title of Miss Mundo de Puerto Rico 2016 after Stephanie Del Valle was crowned Miss World 2016.
- Miss Cayey, Desireé Del Río, competed at Miss Universe Puerto Rico 2011 representing Ciales. She finished as 3rd runner-up. She later competed at Miss International 2011 and finished as 3rd runner-up. Sha later went on to compete at Miss Supranational 2013, she placed on the Top 20 and won the Miss Photogenic award.
- Miss Fajardo, Patricia Corcino, competed at Miss Universe Puerto Rico 2010 representing Caguas, but didn't classify. She later went on to compete on Nuestra Belleza Latina 2011 where she finished on the 6th place.
- Miss Adjuntas, Laura Irizarry, won the Elite Model Look Puerto Rico 2010 and represented Puerto Rico in China.
- Miss Yauco, Natalia Leyva, was chosen to represent Puerto Rico at Reinado Internacional del Banano 2012 in Ecuador. She finished in Top 5.
- Miss Toa Alta, Ariana Diaz, competed at Top Model of the World 2013. She placed as Semi-finalist. Ariana was chosen to compete after the resignation of Miss Orocovis, Amanda Ortiz.
- Miss Corozal, María Nelly Vicioso, later competed at Nuestra Belleza Latina 2013 where she placed in the Top 30. She then competed at Miss Dominican Republic 2013, representing Santo Domingo Este, where she placed in the Top 13.

=== Historical significance ===
- Arecibo won Miss Universe Puerto Rico for the first time.
- The following municipalities also made the semi-finals last year were Aguas Buenas, Arroyo, Cayey, Mayagüez, Toa Alta, and Toa Baja.
- Toa Baja placed for the fourth consecutive year.
- Las Piedras last placed in 2002.
- Lares last placed in 2004.
- Fajardo last placed in 2007.
- Adjuntas and Arecibo last placed in 2009.
- Dorado and Rincón last placed in 2010.
- Canóvanas, Corozal, and Humacao last placed in 2011.

Preceded by {{{before}}}	Miss Universe Puerto Rico; 2013	Succeeded by 2014
