= Miss Universe Puerto Rico 2012 =

57th Annual Miss Universe Puerto Rico pageant

- Date: November 7, 2011
- Presenters: Raymond Arrieta; Alexandra Fuentes; Mariana Vicente
- Venue: Centro de Bellas Artes, Santurce, San Juan, Puerto Rico
- Broadcaster: Telemundo
- Entrants: 39
- Placements: 16
- Winner: Bodine Koehler; Río Grande
- Congeniality: Raiza González; Morovis
- Photogenic: Nadyalee Torres; Aguas Buenas
- Best Municipal Costume: Nicole Marie Pérez; Cayey

Miss Universe Puerto Rico 2012 was the 57th Miss Universe Puerto Rico pageant, held at the Centro de Bellas Artes de Santurce in San Juan, Puerto Rico on November 7, 2011.

Viviana Ortiz of Corozal crowned Bodine Koehler of Río Grande at the end of the event. Koehler represented Puerto Rico at Miss Universe 2012 on December 19, 2012 in Las Vegas, Nevada, United States.

Also, Stephanie Román, Chanty Vargas, and Valery Velez, who were chosen to represent Puerto Rico at Miss Continente Americano, Miss Intercontinental, and Miss Supranational, also crowned their successors to represent Puerto Rico at Miss Continente Americano 2012, Miss Intercontinental 2012 and Miss Supranational 2012.

In addition to that, Top Model of the World Puerto Rico 2012 was also crowned. On March 15, 2012, when Vanessa De Roide was crowned Nuestra Belleza Latina 2012 and was forced to give up the title of Miss Intercontinental Puerto Rico, Desiree Lowry, the director of the franchise Miss Universe Puerto Rico, said they were thinking of choosing a candidate detail to represent Puerto Rico at Miss Intercontinental in October in Germany.

== Results ==
=== Placements ===
Placement	Contestant
Miss Universe Puerto Rico 2012	Río Grande – Bodine Koehler
Miss Intercontinental Puerto Rico 2012	Carolina – Vanessa De Roide (resigned)
Miss Supranational Puerto Rico 2012	Toa Alta – Gabriela Berrios
Miss Continente Americano Puerto Rico 2012	Arroyo – Jennifer Guevara
Top Model of the World 2012	Aguas Buenas – Nadyalee Torres
1st Runner-Up	Aguada – Shaleyka Cristine Vélez
Top 10	Camuy – Verónica Rodríguez; Loíza – Sasha Valdés; Mayagüez – Mara Liz Rivera; Yabucoa – Darla Pacheco
Top 16	Cayey – Nicole Marie Pérez; Lajas – Beverly Alvarez; Morovis – Raiza González; Sabana Grande – Sue Haley Torres; Toa Baja – Rahmam Khalil Mohamed; Yauco – Jennifer Lorraine Luyando

=== Special awards ===
Award	Contestant
Best Smile	Carolina – Vanessa De Roide
Best Legs	Yabucoa – Darla Pacheco
Best Figure	Río Grande – Bodine Koehler
Best Hair	Aguas Buenas – Nadyalee Torres
Most Beautiful Face	Toa Alta – Gabriela Berrios
Skinny Cow Best Style	Arroyo – Jennifer Guevara
Payless Best Catwalk Award	Río Grande – Bodine Koehler
Miss Photogenic	Aguas Buenas – Nadyalee Torres
Miss Congeniality	Morovis – Raiza González
JCPenney Style Award	Río Grande – Bodine Koehler
Best National Costume	Cayey – Nicole Pérez

== Castings ==
Casting calls were held throughout Puerto Rico during the summer of 2011. Only 39 became the official contestants in an event on July 10, 2011 in Teatro Ambassador in San Juan. The judges of the final choice were trainer, Jackie Rodriguez, stylist, Junior Melendez, ex-Miss Puerto Rico contestant, Mari Tere Benes, choreographer, Estela Velez, designers, Richard Cotto and Rebecca Tiago and beauty queens expert Edgardo Virella.

== Contestants ==
Here is a list of the official 39 contestants:

Municipality	Contestant	Age	Height	Hometown
Aguada	Shaleyka Vélez Avilés	18	1.76 m (5 ft 9 1/2 in)	Aguada
Aguadilla	Emily Kristina Torres Suárez	18	1.69 m (5 ft 6 1/2 in)	San Juan
Aguas Buenas	Nadyalee Torres López	23	1.76 m (5 ft 9 1/2 in)	Aguas Buenas
Arroyo	Jennifer Guevara Campos	24	1.80 m (5 ft 11 in)	Arroyo
Bayamón	Kiara Lee Soto Colón	20	1.73 m (5 ft 8 in)	Bayamón
Camuy	Verónica Rodríguez Hernández	22	1.75 m (5 ft 9 in)	Camuy
Canóvanas	Wendilys Cruz Fontánez	20	1.70 m (5 ft 7 in)	Canóvanas
Carolina	Vanessa De Roide Toledo	24	1.77 m (5 ft 9 1/2 in)	Carolina
Cataño	Kiara Zayas Rodríguez	18	1.70 m (5 ft 7 in)	San Juan
Cayey	Nicole Marie Pérez Aponte	22	1.77 m (5 ft 9 1/2 in)	Cayey
Coamo	Victoria Angélica Caraballo	17	1.75 m (5 ft 9 in)	San Juan
Dorado	Vilmarie Rosado Calderón	26	1.73 m (5 ft 8 in)	Carolina
Florida	Krystal Lynn Domenech Ramos	19	1.69 m (5 ft 6 1/2 in)	Florida
Guayama	Yolanda Marrero González	24	1.80 m (5 ft 11 in)	Guayama
Guaynabo	Isabel Marisa Corsino Carro	26	1.78 m (5 ft 10 in)	Guaynabo
Gurabo	Illiane Benítez Álamo	19	1.73 m (5 ft 8 in)	Bayamón
Hormigueros	Jeanelly Vargas	18	1.68 m (5 ft 6 in)	Carolina
Humacao	Beverly Serrano Lebrón	19	1.68 m (5 ft 6 in)	Humacao
Lajas	Beverly Alvarez Torres	18	1.73 m (5 ft 8 in)	San Juan
Las Piedras	Lucianne Meléndez Rivera	18	1.70 m (5 ft 7 in)	Las Piedras
Loíza	Sasha Valdés Orta	27	1.73 m (5 ft 8 in)	San Juan
Luquillo	Isisnachelly Rosario Rivera	20	1.73 m (5 ft 8 in)	Carolina
Mayagüez	Mara Liz Rivera Ramos	19	1.73 m (5 ft 8 in)	Mayagüez
Morovis	Raiza González Montes	19	1.73 m (5 ft 8 in)	Bayamón
Naguabo	Artdalis Pérez	19	1.70 m (5 ft 7 in)	Naguabo
Orocovis	Yanilis Limar Torres Rodríguez	19	1.70 m (5 ft 7 in)	Bayamón
Río Grande	Bodine Koehler Peña	19	1.84 m (6 ft 1/2 in)	San Juan
Sabana Grande	Sue Haley Torres Feliciano	19	1.68 m (5 ft 6 in)	Sabana Grande
San Germán	Stephanie Cancel Prieto	20	1.79 m (5 ft 10 1/2 in)	San Germán
San Juan	Nanette Marie Miranda Rivera	22	1.70 m (5 ft 7 in)	San Juan
Toa Alta	Gabriela Berríos Pagán	20	1.78 m (5 ft 10 in)	San Juan
Toa Baja	Rahman Khalil Mohamed	19	1.68 m (5 ft 6 in)	Toa Baja
Trujillo Alto	Carmen Alicia Torres Ortiz	20	1.73 m (5 ft 8 in)	Trujillo Alto
Utuado	Linnette Zoé Vélez Cortés	22	1.70 m (5 ft 7 in)	Utuado
Yabucoa	Darli Arni Pacheco Montañez	21	1.84 m (6 ft 1/2 in)	San Juan
Yauco	Jennifer Lorraine Luyando Cruz	21	1.79 m (5 ft 10 1/2 in)	Bayamón

Preceded by {{{before}}}	Miss Universe Puerto Rico; 2012	Succeeded by 2013
