= Darla Pacheco =

Puerto Rican model

- Born: Darli Arni Pacheco Montañez; April 16, 1989 (age 37); Puerto Rico
- Height: 1.84 m (6 ft 1/2 in)
- Beauty pageant titleholder
- Title: Miss Ponce Universe 2009; Miss Yabucoa Universe 2012; Miss Earth Puerto Rico 2012; Miss Ponce Mundo 2014
- Hair color: Brown
- Eye color: Green
- Major competitions: Miss Puerto Rico Universe 2009 (Top 20); Miss International Beauty 2009 (semifinalist); Miss Universe Puerto Rico 2012 (Top 10); Miss Earth Puerto RIco 2012 (winner); Miss Earth 2012 (Unplaced); Miss Mundo de Puerto Rico 2014 (Top 6)

Darli Arni Pacheco Montañez (born April 16, 1989, in Puerto Rico), also known as Darla Pacheco, is a Puerto Rican beauty pageant titleholder and a model.

== Beauty pageants ==
=== Miss Puerto Rico Universe 2009 ===
On October 22, 2008, Pacheco competed at the Miss Puerto Rico Universe 2009 pageant representing the state of Ponce. Darli became one of the twenty semi-finalists.

=== Miss International Beauty 2009 ===
On August 1, 2009, Pacheco competed at the Miss International Beauty 2009 pageant representing her country Puerto Rico.

=== Miss Universe Puerto Rico 2012 ===
On November 7, 2011, Pacheco competed at the Miss Universe Puerto Rico 2012 pageant representing the city of Yabucoa. She finished in the Top 10 and won the Best Legs Award.

=== Miss Earth Puerto Rico 2012 ===
On August 11, 2012, Pacheco competed at the Miss Earth Puerto Rico 2012 pageant, where she was crowned as the Miss Earth Puerto Rico 2012. Darli represented Puerto Rico at the Miss Earth 2012 pageant in Indonesia but failed to place in the semifinals.

=== Miss Mundo de Puerto Rico 2014 ===
Pacheco represented Ponce at Miss Mundo de Puerto Rico 2014 where she finished in the Top 6. The eventual winner was Genesis Davila of Arroyo.

Awards and achievements
Preceded by Agnes Benítez (Cataño)	Miss Earth Puerto Rico; 2012	Succeeded by Velmary Cabassa (Cabo Rojo)
Preceded by Génesis Espinosa	Miss Yabucoa Universe; 2012	Succeeded by Tershya Soto
Preceded by Mónica Alvarado	Miss Ponce Universe; 2009	Succeeded by Mariela Ramirez
