= Wilnelia Merced =

Puerto Rican Miss World winner and model

Wilnelia, Lady Forsyth-Johnson
- Merced in 1975
- Born: Wilnelia Merced Cruz; 12 October 1957 (age 69); Caguas, Puerto Rico
- Occupations: Actress; model; beauty queen
- Spouse: Bruce Forsyth (m. 1983; died 2017)
- Children: 1
- Beauty pageant titleholder
- Title: Miss Caguas Mundo 1975; Miss Mundo de Puerto Rico 1975; Miss World 1975
- Hair color: Brown
- Eye color: Brown
- Major competitions: Miss Mundo de Puerto Rico 1975 (Winner); Miss World 1975 (Winner) (Miss World Americas)

Wilnelia, Lady Forsyth-Johnson (née Merced Cruz; born 12 October 1957) is a Puerto Rican former actress, model and beauty queen. She was crowned Miss World 1975, and was married to British entertainer Sir Bruce Forsyth from 1983 until his death in August 2017.

== Career ==
Born in Caguas, Puerto Rico, Merced won Miss Mundo de Puerto Rico 1975 and went on to win the Miss World 1975 title at the Royal Albert Hall in London. She remained the only Puerto Rican to win the title until Stephanie Del Valle was crowned Miss World 2016 after serving as a judge for the pageant. She travelled widely during 1975 and was invited to El Salvador by the Salvadorean military government before the civil war.

After passing on her crown in 1976, she was signed by Ford Models in New York City. In 1978, a giant poster of Wilnelia Merced was displayed in Times Square. She was introduced to British television entertainer Bruce Forsyth at the 1980 Miss World competition gala in London. While still a public figure at home in Puerto Rico, she retired from modelling after her marriage to Forsyth in 1983.

== Personal life ==
Merced married Bruce Forsyth in New York in 1983. The couple's son, Jonathan Joseph ("JJ"), was born in November 1986. She remained married to Forsyth until his death in August 2017. She now lives with her son near the Wentworth Estate in Surrey, England.

On 29 January 2018, for the first time, Merced spoke openly about the final days she spent with her husband before his death. She expressed her appreciation of being able to be with him at the last moment. She felt "lucky" that all the close family members managed to say goodbye at his deathbed. Merced recalled that Forsyth was surrounded by all his daughters, who kept him company and watched films together. Merced said that Forsyth had wished to celebrate his hundredth birthday at the London Palladium.

A portrait of Merced is displayed in the Fundación Nacional para la Cultura Popular, with others, in their "Women with their own style" exhibit.

== See also ==
- List of Puerto Ricans
- History of women in Puerto Rico

Awards and achievements
Preceded by (South Africa) Anneline Kriel	Miss World; 1975	Succeeded by (Jamaica) Cindy Breakspeare
Preceded by Loyda Eunice Valle Blas Machado	Miss Mundo de Puerto Rico; 1975	Succeeded by Ivette Rosado
