= Micah Alberti =

American model and actor (born 1984)

- Born: Micah Anthony Alberti; August 19, 1984 (age 41); Oregon, Wisconsin, US
- Occupations: Actor, model
- Years active: 2002–present

Micah Anthony Alberti (born August 19, 1984) is an American model and actor.

== Career ==
Alberti began modeling as an adolescent and obtained his first acting job playing James Edward Martin on All My Children. After his one-year stint on the soap opera ended, Alberti appeared on prime-time guest spots (8 Simple Rules, Smallville) until he landed the role on the ABC Family drama Wildfire as troubled teen Matt Ritter. In 2009, he starred in the cable thriller Xtra Credit as a convicted teen attending a prison-reform school who is seduced by a teacher desperate to get out of her abusive marriage.

== Personal life ==
In 2010, Alberti and Rumer Willis, the eldest daughter of actors Bruce Willis and Demi Moore, split.

== Filmography ==
Film
Year	Film	Role	Notes
2005	American Pie Presents: Band Camp	Football Player	Direct-to-DVD release
2008	Beer for My Horses	Jeff	
2009	Forget Me Not	Jake Mitchell	
2009	Doc West	Burt Baker	
2009	Triggerman	Burt Baker	
2010	Wake up	Rob	
2011	Rock the House	Ryan	
2013	Shadow on the Mesa	Chuck Eastman	
2013	Missing at 17	Vance	
2013	Non-Stop	Peter	
2016	Backstabbed	Grant Wilson	
Television
Year	Title	Role	Notes
2002–2003	All My Children	James Edward 'Jamie' Martin #2	2 episodes
2004	Soap Center	Self	
2004	Smallville	Nathan Dean	Episode: "Whisper"
2004	As the World Turns	Grown up Cabot	1 episode
2005	8 Simple Rules	Kenny	1 episode
2005–2008	Wildfire	Matt Ritter	52 episodes
2007	CSI: Miami	Zach Hemmings	1 episode
2011	The Icarus II Project	Jones	1 Episode
Appearances
Year	Show/Event	Role	Notes
2003	The View	Self	
2003	The 30th Annual Daytime Emmy Awards	Self	
2009	Golden Globe Awards	Self	
