= Forget Me Not (2009 film) =

2009 American supernatural horror film

- Theatrical release poster
- Directed by: Tyler Oliver
- Written by: Tyler Oliver; Jamieson Stern
- Produced by: Tyler Oliver; Jamieson Stern
- Starring: Carly Schroeder; Cody Linley; Micah Alberti; Brie Gabrielle; Jillian Murray
- Cinematography: Eric Leach
- Edited by: Radu Ion
- Music by: Elia Cmiral
- Production company: Vindicated Pictures
- Distributed by: Phase 4 Films
- Release date: October 22, 2009 (Screamfest)
- Running time: 95 minutes
- Country: United States
- Language: English
- Budget: $1.3 million
- Box office: $13,465

Forget Me Not is a 2009 American supernatural horror film written and directed by Tyler Oliver. Premiering on August 24, 2009, the film had a limited theatrical release and stars Carly Schroeder, Cody Linley, Micah Alberti, Brie Gabrielle, and Jillian Murray.

== Plot ==
A crying little girl runs through a graveyard. She makes it to her house and her parents ask her what's wrong. She responds, "I don't remember."

Years later, Sandy Channing and her brother, Eli, are college bound students who attend a party at their friend TJ's house. When they go to the graveyard to play a game, a new girl their age joins them. They play a ghost version of 'Tag', and the new girl wins. The girl asks Sandy if she remembers her. Sandy does not, and the girls states, "You will," before jumping off a cliff. The police are unable to find a body.

A flashback shows a young Sandy and another young girl playing the ghost game in the graveyard during the day. When they sit and talk, the girl explains to Sandy that the flower in her hair is a forget-me-not, which is put on graves so people remember the dead. Sandy says she doesn't know any dead people, and the girl replies, "I do". The two proclaim themselves "best friends forever."

In the present, Layla and Chad have sex in Chad's car, after which Chad tells Layla he wants to break up. Layla throws her necklace, bearing his class ring, into the lake. Chad drives off and Layla dives in to retrieve the necklace. She sees a mysterious girl in the water, who drowns her. The girl is revealed to be a demonic incarnation of the girl who jumped from the cliff. Chad arrives at Sandy and Eli's house, and when Sandy mentions Layla, Chad does not know who she means.

The group is waiting for TJ to arrive so they can go on a beach trip. TJ buys an engagement ring for his girlfriend, Lex. He is then killed by the now-demonic Layla. When Sandy mentions TJ to her boyfriend Jake (Lex's brother), none of the group know who she means.

Chad is killed next when the ghost friends make his car explode. Sandy yells at Eli to pull over when she sees Chad's car. However, only Sandy remembers who Chad is. Sandy drives to TJ's house, which is a vacant ruin. As Sandy goes into the house with Jake and Eli, Lex and Hannah get into an argument in the car. Sandy begins to remember the girl from the graveyard, and the name Angela, as her childhood friend. Lex is killed by the growing cadre of ghost friends. The other three think Sandy is crazy, as none of them remember Lex.

Sandy and the others go to the police station, where they learn the mysterious girl's name is Angela Smith and she now lives in a convent. At a hotel, Hannah and Eli go to the pool and have sex, after which Hannah is killed by the ghost friends.

At the convent, Sandy and Jake discover Angela is in a coma. Jake is killed and Eli doesn't remember him. He realizes that they are being erased from time, just like the rhyme they sing before playing the graveyard game. Sandy's parents, believing she has become depressed, admits her to a hospital. Eli is killed by his friends' ghosts, and when Sandy asks for Eli, their parents do not know him.

Sandy dreams of a time when she and her friends played a scary prank on Angela, who had a seizure in front of the convent after knocking her head into the door. Sister Dolores comes out of the convent and screams "who did this?". It is revealed that the little girl at the beginning of the film is a young Sandy, and the older girl who jumped from the cliff is Angela. Sandy awakes and, recalling the rhyme to "kill the ghost or seal your fate", goes to Angela's room and disconnects her life support. Angela sits up, and the ghost friends chase Sandy to the roof. The child version of Angela appears, hands Sandy some forget-me-nots, then reveals a demonic expression as she says, "Best friends forever, right, Sandy?" Sandy falls from the roof.

The grown Angela "miraculously" awakens from her coma, while Sandy is now in a coma of her own.

== Cast ==
- Carly Schroeder as Sandy
- Courtney Biggs as Young Sandy
- Micah Alberti as Jake
- Brittany Renee Finamore as Angela
- Bella Thorne as Young Angela
- Brie Gabrielle as Hannah
- Jillian Murray as Lex
- Zachary Abel as Chad
- Sean Wing as TJ
- Chloe Bridges as Layla
- Dan Gauthier as Sheriff Mitchell
- Christopher Atkins as Mr. Channing
- Julie Janney as Mrs. Channing
- Cody Linley as Eli
- Joey Luthman as Young Eli
- Barbara Bain as Sister Dolores
- Charles Dierkop as Foreman Pete

== Production ==
The special effects for the film were provided by Roy Knyrim of SOTA FX.

== Release ==
Forget Me Not was released at the Screamfest on October 22, 2009. Phase 4 Films released it on video on demand on May 3, 2011, and it was released on DVD on May 24, 2011.

== Reception ==
=== Box office ===
With a limited theatrical release, Forget Me Not grossed $13,465 at the box office, against a budget of $1.3 million.

=== Critical response ===
Robert Bell of Exclaim! wrote, "It's boring, insulting and can't even entertain on a superficial visceral level." Justin Felix of DVD Talk rated it 3/5 stars and called it "a surprisingly original take on standard slasher film and vengeful ghost tropes"
