= Miss World Puerto Rico =

Beauty pageant

- Formation: 1959
- Type: Beauty pageant
- Headquarters: San Juan
- Location: Puerto Rico
- Members: Miss World
- Official language: Spanish
- President: Julia Morley

Miss World Puerto Rico or Miss Mundo de Puerto Rico is a national Beauty pageant that selects Puerto Rico's representative to the Miss World pageant.

== History ==
Puerto Rico debuted in Miss World in 1959, then was absent from 1960 to 1969. In 1970 a new organization took the responsibility of sending contestants until 1985 via castings. Puerto Rico did not compete in Miss World from 1986 to 1988. The Miss Puerto Rico organization, directed by Anna Santisteban, obtained the Miss World franchise in 1989, Tania Collazo was her first Miss World delegate. Santisteban produced Miss World PR until 1995.

In 1996, Delia Cruz, mother of Miss World Wilnelia Merced Cruz, obtained the franchise and began organizing the Miss Mundo de Puerto Rico pageant with Tania Collazo as organizer for a few years before Desiree Lowry and later on Shanira Blanco. Winners have been competing ever since in the international pageant. Puerto Rico has produced two winners (1975,2016), two 2nd runners-up (2005, 2011) and ten semi-finalists (1976, 1978, 1980, 1985, 2002, 2003, 2006, 2007, 2008, 2010), and three quarter-finalists (2012, 2019, 2021).

In 2017, due to the devastating effects of two hurricanes that heavily ravaged the entire island within a week, the organizers of Miss World Puerto Rico decided not to send the country's representative in this year's Miss World. No delegate was appointed due to lack of funding and sponsorship.

== Representatives ==
The Miss World pageant began in 1951 and since then Puerto Rico has had 20 representatives classify in the finals including: 2 winners, 2 runners-up, 11 semi-finalists and 5 quarter-finalists.

Color key

- Declared as Winner
- Ended as runner-up
- Ended as one of the finalists or semifinalists

Year	Municipality	Miss World Puerto Rico	Placement	Special Awards	Notes
2027	TBA	TBA	TBA		
2026	Dorado	Suil Anyelina Pagan	Top 40	Miss World Sports	
2025	Manatí	Valeria Nicole Pérez Santiago	Top 20	Beauty With a Purpose & Best Designer Dress (Americas and Caribbean) Top 48 Miss World Talent	
2024	No competition held				
2023	Toa Baja	Elena Rivera Reyes	Top 40	Top 25 Miss World Head to Head Challenge Top 23 Miss World Talent	
2022	Miss World 2021 was rescheduled to 16 March 2022 due to the COVID-19 pandemic outbreak in Puerto Rico, no edition started in 2022				
2021	Naranjito	Aryam Mariel Díaz Rosado	Top 40	2nd runner-up Miss World Top Model	
2020	Due to the impact of COVID-19 pandemic, no pageant in 2020				
2019	Bayamón	Daniella Rodríguez Laureano	Top 40	Top 40 Miss World Top Model	
2018	Canóvanas	Dayanara Martínez Rosado		Top 18 Miss World Talent; 3rd Runner-up Sanya Tourism Promotional Video Award	
2017	No Representative due to the devastating effects of two hurricanes				
2016	Toa Baja	Stephanie Marie Del Valle Díaz	Miss World 2016	Top 21 Miss World Talent	
2016	Dorado	Stephanie Román de León	Did not compete		
2015	Quebradillas	Keysi Marie Vargas Vélez		Top 5 Miss World Top Model	
2014	Arroyo	Génesis María Dávila Pérez		Top 20 Miss World Top Model	
2013	Caguas	Nadyalee Torres López			
2012	Barceloneta	Janelee Marcus Chaparro Colón	Top 30	Top 10 Best Dress Designer Award; Top 40 Miss World Beach Beauty; Top 46 Miss World Top Model	
2011	San Juan	Amanda Victoria Vilanova Pérez	2nd Runner-up	Queen of Caribbean; Top 11 Miss World Talent; Top 24 Miss World Sports; Top 30 Beauty with a Purpose	
2010	Barranquitas	Yara Liz Lasanta Santiago	Top 25	Winner Miss World Beach Beauty	
2009	Bayamón	Jennifer Colón Alvarado		Top 12 Miss World Beach Beauty; Top 12 Miss World Sports; Top 12 Best Dress Designer Award	Later Miss Universe Puerto Rico 2024
2008	San Juan	Ivonne Marie Orsini López	Top 15	Top 32 Miss World Top Model	
2007	Orocovis	Jennifer Guevara Campos	Top 16	1st Runner-up Miss World Top Model	
2006	Arecibo	Thebyam Carrión Álvarez	Top 17	1st Runner-up Miss World Sports; Top 25 Miss World Beach Beauty	
2005	Dorado	Ingrid Marie Rivera Santos	2nd Runner-up	Queen of Caribbean	
2004	Luquillo	Cassandra Castro Holland			
2003	Bayamón	Joyceline Montero García	Top 20	1st Runner-up Miss World Talent	
2002	Guaynabo	Cassandra Polo Berríos	Top 20		
2001	Vieques	Barbara Serrano Negrón			
2000	Toa Alta	Sarybel Velilla Cabeza			
1999	Bayamón	Arlene Torres Torres			
1998	Juana Díaz	Antonia Alfonso Pagán			
1997	Dorado	Aurea Isis Marrero Nieves			
1996	Guaynabo	Marissa De La Caridad Hernández Cardona			Miss Mundo de Puerto Rico — Delia Cruz & Wilnelia Merced Cruz Lady Forsyth-Johnson Directorship
Miss Puerto Rico World/Miss World Puerto Rico through Miss Puerto Rico/Señorita Puerto Rico
1995	Guaynabo	Swanni Quiñones Laracuente			
1994	Aguas Buenas	Joyce Marie Giraud Mojica			
1993	San Juan	Ana Rosa Brito Suárez			
1992	Trujillo Alto	Lianabel Rosario Centeno			
1991	Lajas	Johanna Berenice Irizarry Nazario			
1990	San Juan	Magdalena Pabón			
1989	Orocovis	Tania Collazo Barreiro			Señorita Puerto Rico/Miss Puerto Rico — Ana Santisteban Directorship
Miss Puerto Rico for Miss World
1985	San Juan	Iris Matías Gonzáles	Top 15		
1984	San Juan	Maria De Los Angeles Rosas Silva			
1983	Aibonito	Fatima Mustafá Vázquez			
1982	Morovis	Jannette Torres Burgos			
1981	San Juan	Andrenira Ruiz			
1980	Ponce	Michele Torres Cintrón	Top 15		
1979	San Juan	Daisy Marissette López			
1978	Río Piedras	Maria Jesús Cañizares	Top 15		
1977	Santurce	Didriana "Dee Dee" Del Rio			
1976	Bayamón	Ivette Rosado	Top 15		
1975	Caguas	Wilnelia Merced Cruz	Miss World 1975		
1974	Camuy	Loyda Eunice Valle Blas Machado			
1973		Milagros García			
1972	Ponce	Ana Nisi Goyco			
1971		Raquel Quintana			
1970		Alma Doris Pérez Vélez			
Miss Puerto Rico
1959	San Juan	Lyllianna "Lilie" Díaz Noya			

== Winners' gallery ==
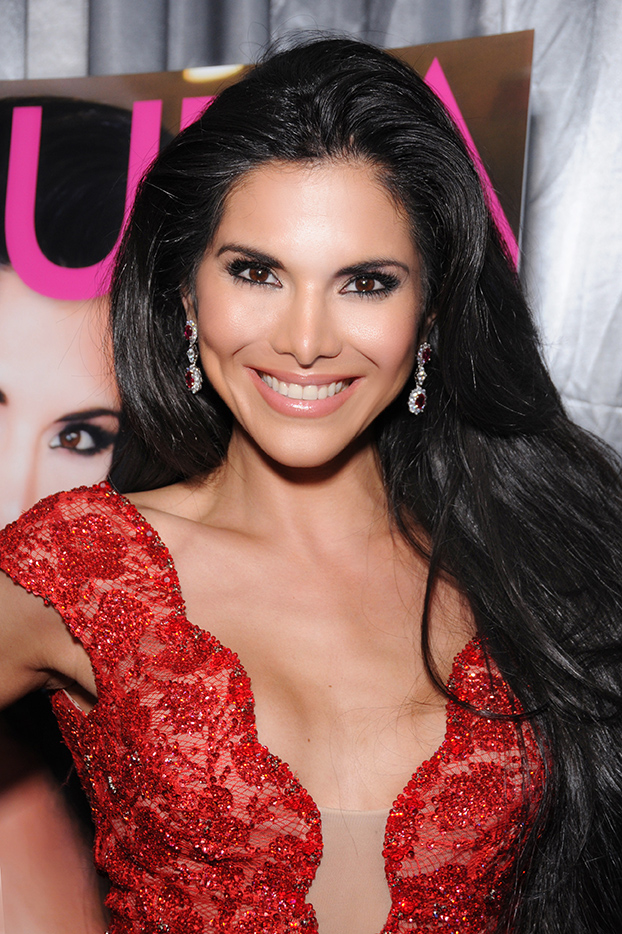
Miss World Puerto Rico 1994
Joyce Marie Giraud Mojica

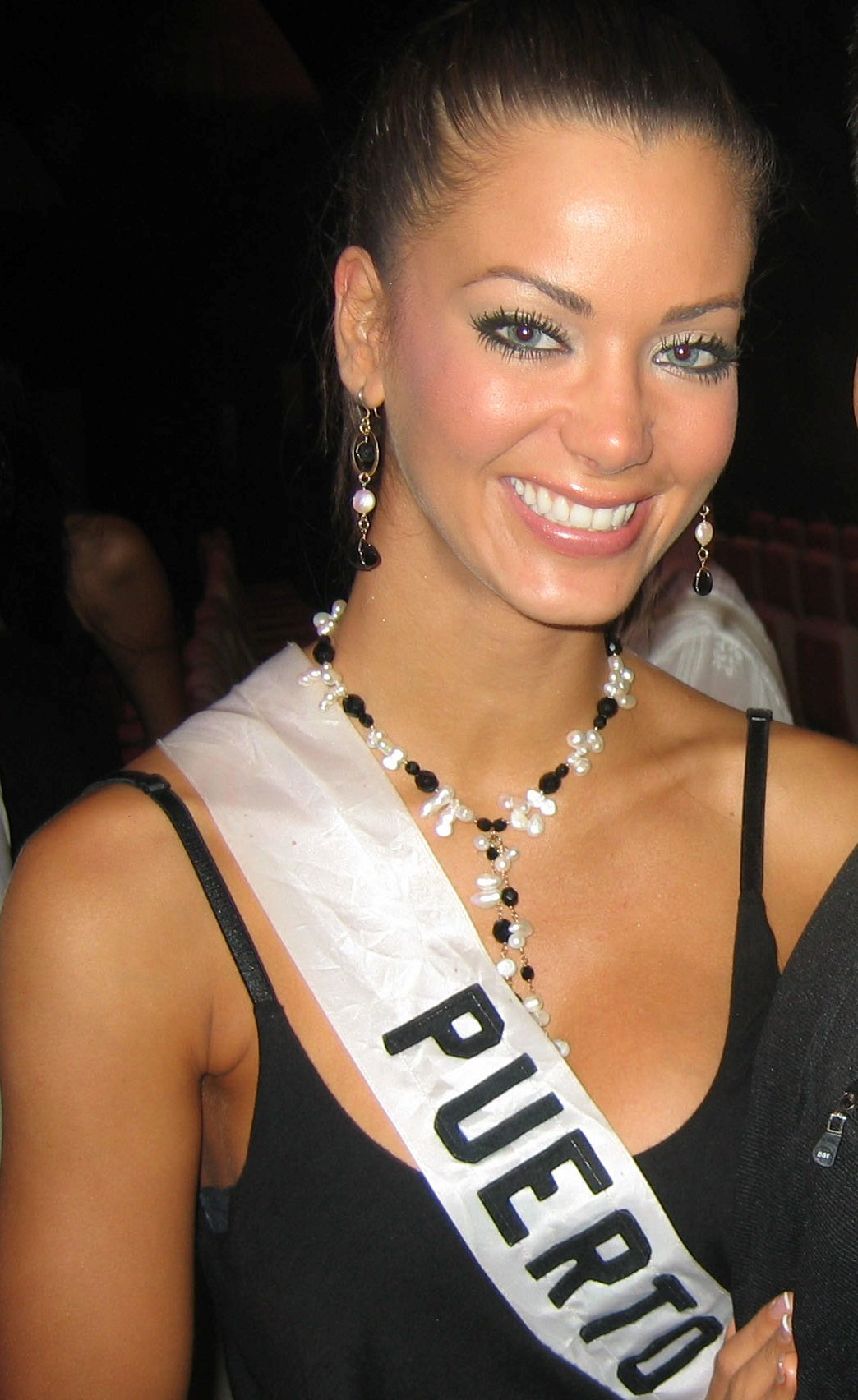
Miss World Puerto Rico 2005
Ingrid Rivera

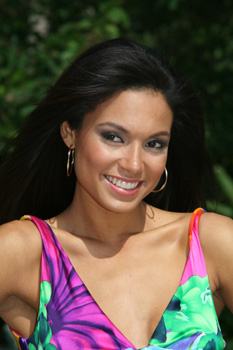
Miss World Puerto Rico 2007
Jennifer Guevara

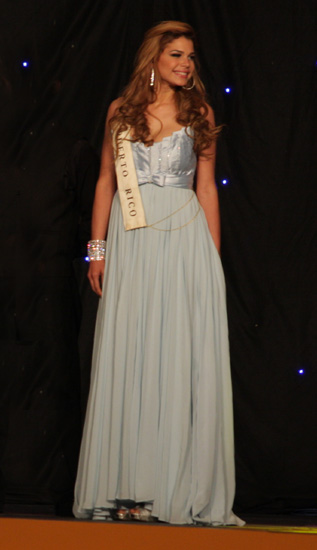
Miss World Puerto Rico 2008
Ivonne Orsini

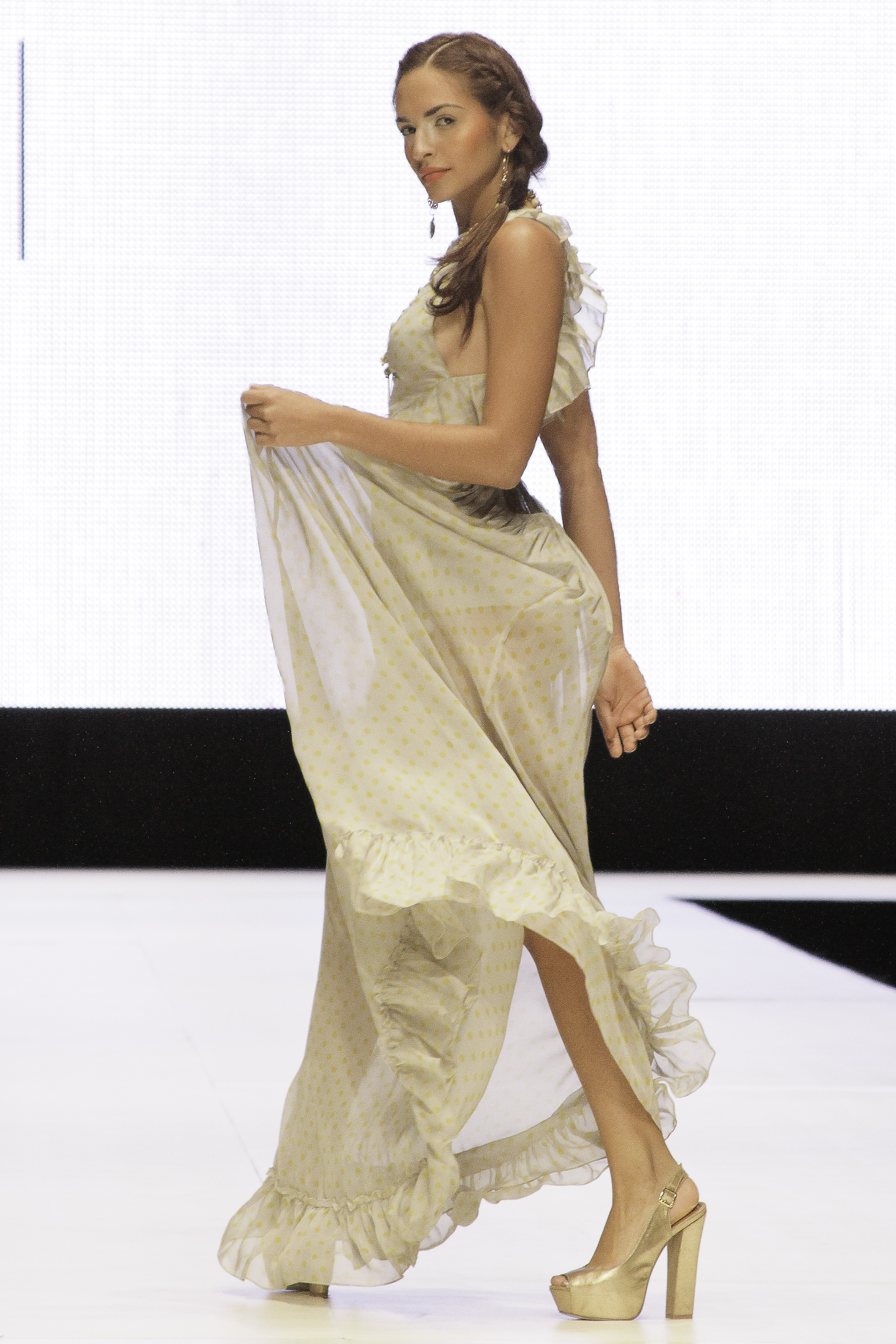
Miss World Puerto Rico 2011
Amanda Vilanova

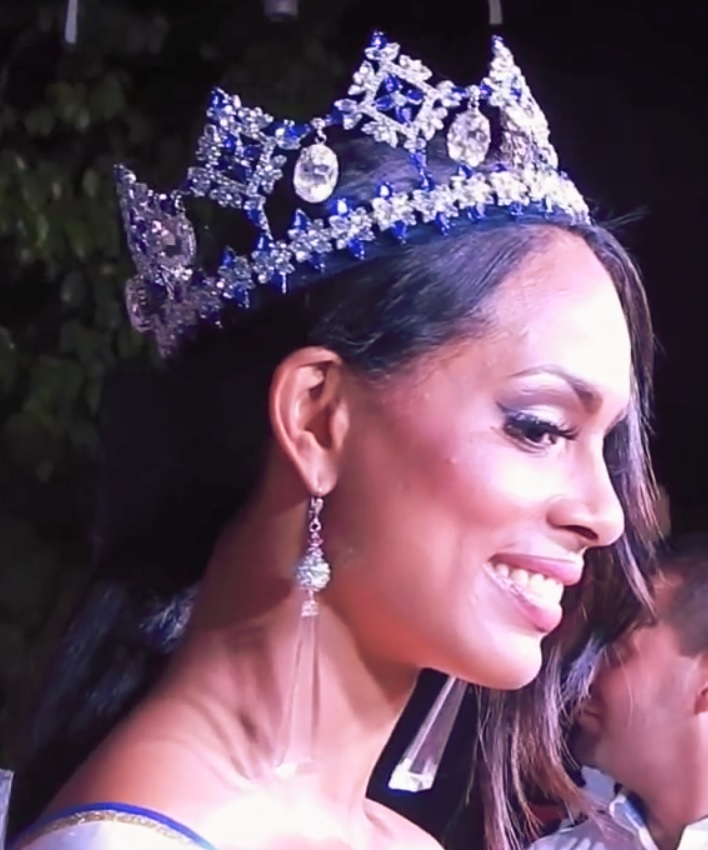
Miss World Puerto Rico 2014
Génesis Dávila

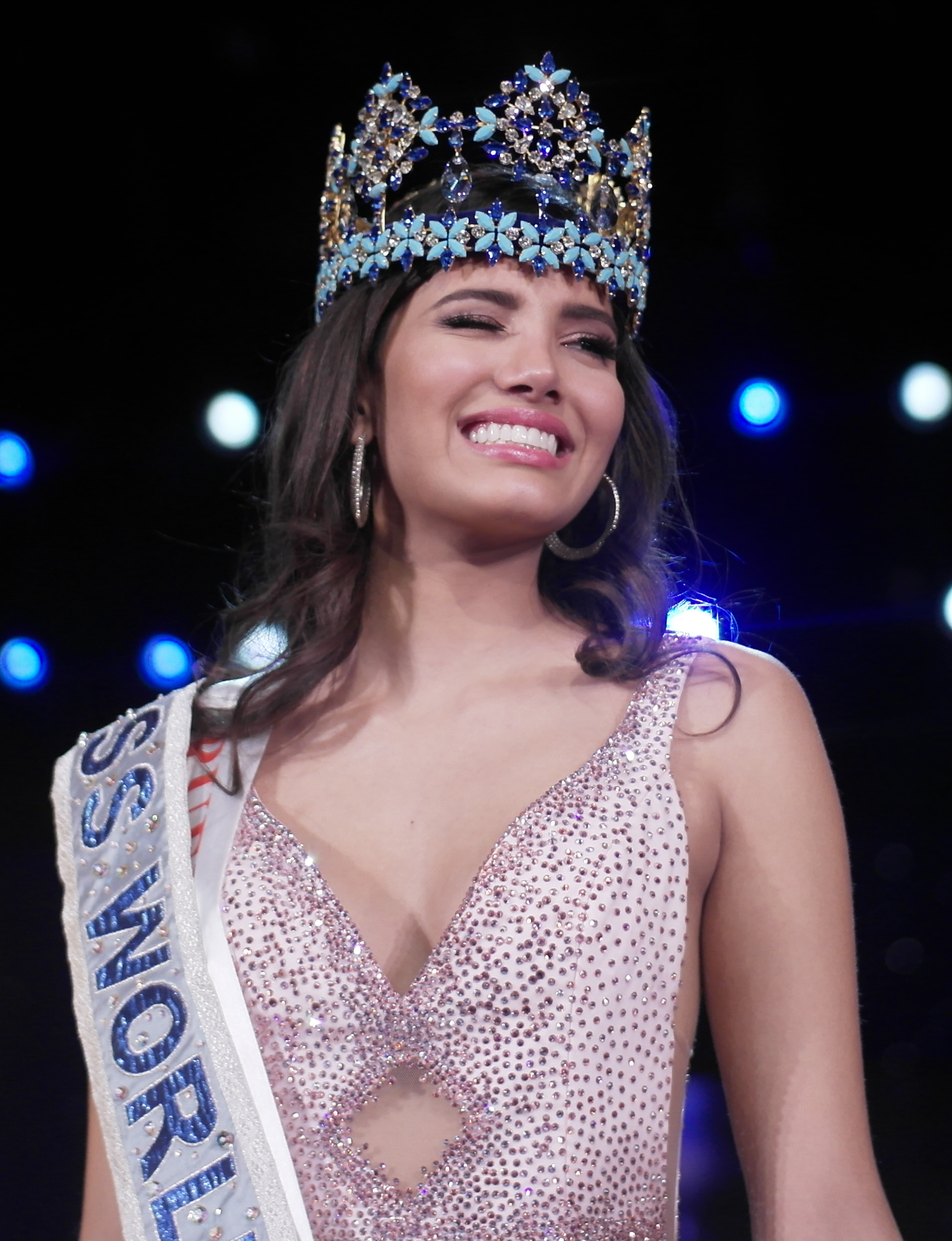
Miss World Puerto Rico 2016
Stephanie Del Valle

== See also ==
- Miss Puerto Rico
