= Brie Gabrielle =

American beauty pageant titleholder

- Born: Briegitte Marie Gabrielle Baldrica; July 4, 1990 (age 36); West Palm Beach, Florida, U.S.
- Height: 5 ft (1.5 m)
- Beauty pageant titleholder
- Title: Miss Florida USA 2016 (Winner)
- Years active: 2008–present
- Eye color: Green
- Major competitions: Miss USA 2016 (Unplaced)

Briegitte Marie Gabrielle Baldrica (born July 4, 1990), known professionally as Brie Gabrielle, is an American beauty pageant titleholder who was crowned Miss Florida USA 2016. She then competed for the national title at Miss USA 2016. As of September 2015, she was a co-host of the Chevy Florida Insider Fishing Report on Fox Sports Sun (Florida).

== Early life ==
Brie is an actress and model; she acted in several movies, including the 2009 films Forget Me Not and Spring Breakdown, and the 2012 film Beautiful Wave.

== Pageant experience ==
Brie competed at the Miss Florida USA state pageant as "Miss Palm Beach" and won the title of Miss Florida. As the state titleholder, she represented Florida at the Miss USA 2016 pageant, but did not place.

Awards and achievements
Preceded by Ashleigh Lollie	Miss Florida USA; 2016	Succeeded by Génesis Dávila (dethroned); Linette De Los Santos (successor)
