= Franceska Toro =

Puerto Rican beauty pageant titleholder (born 1993)

- Born: 1993 (age 32–33); Toa Baja, Puerto Rico
- Height: 1.73 m (5 ft 8 in)
- Beauty pageant titleholder
- Title: Miss Earth Puerto Rico 2014
- Hair color: Brown
- Eye color: Brown
- Major competitions: Miss Mundo de Puerto Rico 2013; (1st Runner-Up); Miss Mundo de Puerto Rico 2014; (1st Runner-Up); Miss Earth 2014; (Unplaced); Top Model of the World 2016; (1st Runner-Up)

Franceska Toro (born 1993 in Toa Baja) is a Puerto Rican model and beauty pageant titleholder who was crowned Miss Earth Puerto Rico 2014 and represented Puerto Rico at Miss Earth 2014.

== Pageantry ==
=== Miss Mundo de Puerto Rico 2014 ===
Franceska competed in Miss Mundo de Puerto Rico 2014, representing Toa Baja, where finished as 1st Runner-Up, giving her the right to represent Puerto Rico at Miss Earth 2014 in November. She was the first Puerto Rican representative for Miss Earth from Miss Mundo Puerto Rico franchise spearheaded by Shanira Blanco. She had also placed 1st Runner-Up at Miss Mundo de Puerto Rico the prior year.

=== Miss Earth 2014 ===
Toro later represented Puerto Rico at Miss Earth 2014 in Diliman, Quezon City, Philippines where she received 3 bronze medals for Darling of the Press, Cocktail wear, and Resort Wear and was also awarded with Miss Psalmstre and Miss Advance. However she failed to place in the Top 16.

The pageant was won by Jamie Herrell of the Philippines.

Awards and achievements
Preceded by Velmary Cabassa	Miss Earth Puerto Rico; 2014	Succeeded by Karla Victoria Aponte
Preceded by Franceska Toro	Miss Mundo Toa Baja; 2014	Succeeded by Stephanie Del Valle
Preceded by -	Miss Mundo Toa Baja; 2013	Succeeded by Franceska Toro
