= Doc West (film) =

- Directed by: Terence Hill; Giulio Base
- Screenplay by: Marcello Olivieri; Luca Biglione
- Story by: Marco Barboni; Marcello Olivieri
- Produced by: Anselmo Parrinello
- Starring: Terence Hill; Paul Sorvino
- Cinematography: Massimiliano Trevis
- Edited by: Roberto Siciliano
- Production companies: RTI; DAP
- Release date: 2009
- Running time: 100 minutes
- Country: Italy
- Language: English

Doc West is a 2009 Italian Western comedy film starring Terence Hill and Paul Sorvino. It is a re-edited version of an Italian TV miniseries.

== Plot ==
Minnesota "Doc" West (Terence Hill) is at a Santa Fe, New Mexico post office, sending marked bills to his daughter. When the post office is robbed by bandits, he rides after them and meets a boy named Silver (Benjamin Petry.)

Silver tells West that the bandits headed for the nearby town. They arrive to witness a conflict between Silver's stepfather, rancher Nathan Mitchell (Boots Southerland) and rival rancher Victor Baker (Adam Taylor.) The argument is broken up by Sheriff Roy Basehart (Paul Sorvino) and the local school teacher Denise Stark (Clare Carey).

At the saloon, West meets Nathan's ranch hand, Garvey (Alessio di Clemente,) who offers him a round of poker. West hustles Garvey, who accuses him of cheating and challenges him to a duel. Basehart arrests West and Garvey keeps the money.

Nathan's daughter, Millie (Mary Petruolo), arrives in town and is greeted by her childhood friends Burt Baker (Micah Alberti) and Jack Baker (Linus Huffman,) Victor's sons. Nathan tells Jack and Burt to stay away from Millie due to rivalry between their fathers.

West talks to the sheriff about his past. West was once a doctor who accidentally killed a patient. When West is released from jail, he gets his money back from Garvey.

Victor's barn mysteriously burns down and he blames Nathan.

In the post office, West is sending money to his daughter. The bank teller notices that the bills are marked, linking Garvey to the bank heist. West decides to stay in town until Garvey is behind bars. Millie, Burt and Jack keep their friendship a secret from their fathers.

The next morning, Nathan discovers that his cattle's waterpump was sabotaged and believes Victor did it. Victor challenges Nathan to a gunfight and Garvey attempts to challenge West, but the sheriff stops them. West decides to settle the rivalry by a boxing match and teaches Burt and Jack to box.

When the Bakers win the boxing match against Garvey. Garvey retrieves a gun, revealing that he burned down Victor's barn and sabotaged Nathan's water pump. He challenges West to another gunfight. West shoots Garvey and leaves him for dead. Garvey shoots back at West, and Silver jumps in front to take the bullet. West shoots and kills Garvey.

West hesitantly performs surgery on Silver and saves his life. West leaves the next morning and Silver rides after him.
