= Stephanie Del Valle =

American-Puerto Rican musician, model, and beauty queen

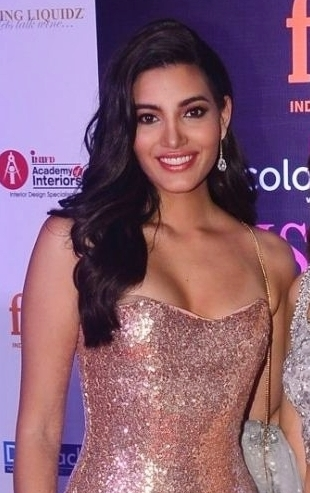
- Del Valle in 2018
- Born: Stephanie Marie Del Valle Díaz; December 30, 1996 (age 29); San Juan, Puerto Rico
- Occupations: Musician; model
- Height: 5 ft 9 in (1.76 m)
- Beauty pageant titleholder
- Title: Miss Mundo de Puerto Rico 2016; Miss World 2016
- Hair color: Brown
- Eye color: Brown
- Major competitions: Miss Mundo de Puerto Rico 2016; (Winner); Miss World 2016; (Winner)

Stephanie Marie Del Valle Díaz (born December 30, 1996) is a Puerto Rican musician, model and beauty queen who was crowned Miss World 2016. She became the second contestant from Puerto Rico to win the Miss World title, after Wilnelia Merced in 1975. She previously won Miss Mundo de Puerto Rico 2016.

== Career ==
Del Valle is attending Pace University in New York City, where she is studying law and also communication. Prior to competing in beauty pageants, Del Valle was the muse to Puerto Rican fashion designer Carlos Alberto. Del Valle speaks Spanish, English and French.

== Pageantry ==
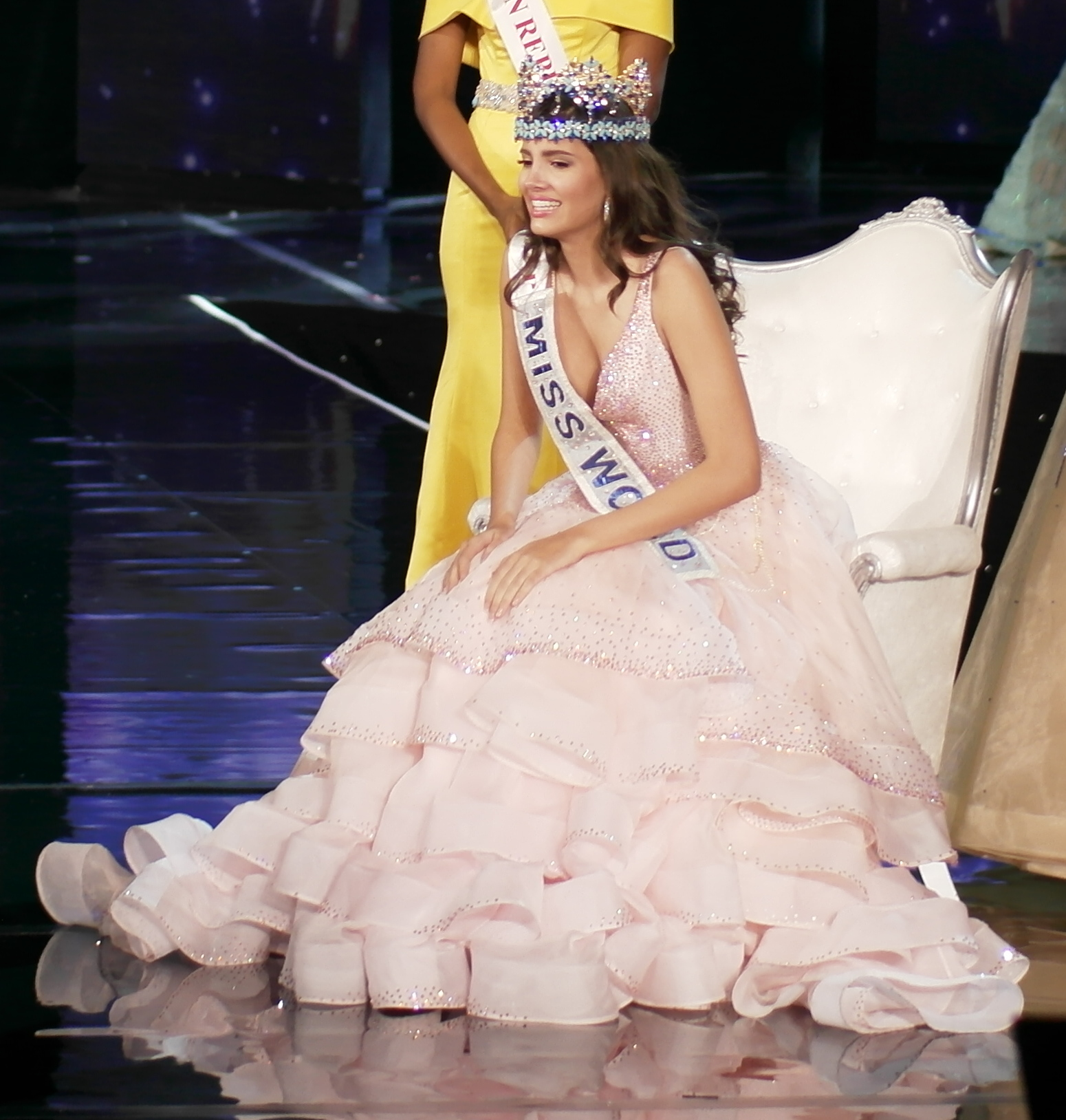
Del Valle crowned Miss World 2016 at the MGM National Harbor, Washington, D.C., United States

=== Miss World Puerto Rico ===
Del Valle competed in the Miss Mundo de Puerto Rico in the year 2016, representing the municipality of Toa Baja. She eventually won the title of Miss World Puerto Rico 2016, and was crowned by the outgoing titleholder Keysi Marie Vargas Vélez. She also won the Talent competition in the pageant.

=== Miss World 2016 ===
She represented Puerto Rico at the Miss World 2016 pageant which was held in Oxon Hill, Maryland, United States. She made it to the Top 21 in the Miss World Talent round. During the grand finale, Del Valle, as one of the Top 5 finalists was asked - “If you had an opportunity to change something about the world, what would it be?” She replied by stating:

“If I have the opportunity to change something about the world, I think what I would do is send a message of how important it is to change exclusion for acceptance, to promote and provide justice for others, and the importance of helping those in need. Thank you.”

She was eventually crowned as Miss World 2016 at the event by the outgoing Miss World 2015, Mireia Lalaguna of Spain. The event was venued in MGM National Harbor, Oxon Hill, Maryland, United States and held on December 18, 2016. This is the second time Puerto Rico had won the Miss World crown, after Wilnelia Merced, Miss World 1975.

During her capacity as Miss World, she traveled to China, United Kingdom, United States, Indonesia, India, South Africa, Philippines, and numerous trips around Puerto Rico.

=== Miss World 2021 ===
Del Valle was set to co-host Miss World 2021 alongside Peter Andre and Fernando Allende at the José Miguel Agrelot Coliseum, though the December final was postponed to March 2022 due to the surging Omicron variant cases on the island, with 23 out of the 97 contestants testing positive for the virus.

A month before the finale's new date, Del Valle and her nonprofit organization Reignite Puerto Rico were served with a lawsuit alleging a breach of contract and embezzlement with the organization Puerto Rico with a Purpose (led by venture capitalist Brock Pierce) after the pageant's initial cancellation in December 2021, demanding a minimum of $1.25 million in back payments. They are also claiming $1.5 million for damages against the non-profit organization.

Del Valle went on the record on her social media and on Puerto Rican television to refute the lawsuit, stating that "[The] allegations are baseless, completely false." Del Valle and her parents then countersued Puerto Rico with a Purpose for $31 million for alleged emotional damages caused against the former beauty queen.

On February 28, 2022, Del Valle took to Instagram to announce she would no longer be hosting the pageant's 70th edition, claiming "It is contrary to my ethics and moral principles to continue working with an organization that has acted in a defamatory, frivolous and unfair manner; solely for the purpose of causing harm."

On March 10, 2022, the Miss World organization sent out a press release from CEO and Chairman Julia Morely stating that "[...] part of the information that was being spread in the media was simply not true." Puerto Rico with a Purpose's lawsuit against Del Valle and Del Valle's countersuit are still active.

== Personal life ==
Del Valle is in a relationship with actor and TV presenter Barney Walsh, the son of Bradley Walsh.

== See also ==
- List of Puerto Ricans
- History of women in Puerto Rico

Awards and achievements
Preceded by (Spain) Mireia Lalaguna	Miss World; 2016	Succeeded by (India) Manushi Chhillar
Preceded by Keysi Vargas (Quebradillas)	Miss World Puerto Rico; 2016	Succeeded by Dayanara Martínez (Canóvanas)
Preceded by Franceska Toro	Miss Toa Baja World; 2016	Succeeded by Deyaneira Agosto Collazo
