= Miss Universe Puerto Rico 2011 =

- Date: November 4, 2010
- Presenters: Luisito Vigoreaux, Cordelia González, Rashel Díaz
- Venue: Puerto Rico Convention Center, San Juan, Puerto Rico
- Broadcaster: Telemundo
- Entrants: 40
- Placements: 15
- Winner: Viviana Ortiz Pastrana; Corozal
- Congeniality: Carolina Rodríguez Ruiz, Cabo Rojo
- Best National Costume: Azarel Nadal Torres, Toa Alta
- Photogenic: Paola Giselle Santiago Serrano, Aguadilla

The 56th Annual Miss Universe Puerto Rico pageant was held at the Centro de Convenciones de Puerto Rico, on November 4, 2010 in San Juan, Puerto Rico.

Mariana Paola Vicente, who won the title of Miss Universe Puerto Rico 2010, crowned her successor Viviana Ortiz, who then represented Puerto Rico at Miss Universe 2011 in São Paulo, Brazil, where she placed in the Top 16.

== Results ==
=== Placements ===
Final results	Contestant
Miss Universe Puerto Rico 2011	Corozal - Viviana Ortiz Pastrana
1st Runner-Up	Bayamón - Stephanie Román De León
2nd Runner-Up	Gurabo - Jessica Joan Santiago Rodríguez
3rd Runner-Up	Ciales - Desirée Del Rio De Jesús
4th Runner-Up	Humacao - Ashley Beth Pérez Calderón
Top 10	Barceloneta - Io Rivera Jiménez; Canóvanas - Raisa Maite Díaz Carrasquillo; Ponce - Giselle Marie Negrón Rivera; San Juan - Miriam Ivette Pabón Carrión; Toa Baja - Dayalí Romero López
Top 15	Guayama - Zuleyka Maril Rodríguez; Guaynabo - Lara María Mercado; Loíza - Yanitza Marisol Rivera Rivera; Mayagüez - Claudia Marie Ramos Zorrilla; Toa Alta - Azarel Nadal Torres

=== Special awards ===
Awards	Contestant
Miss Figure Holsum Light	Gurabo - Jessica Joan Santiago Rodríguez
Miss L'Bel Face	San Juan - Miriam Ivette Pabón Carrión
Miss Payless Catwalk	Corozal - Viviana Ortíz Pastrana
Bloom Best Hair	Cataño - Valery Vélez Cuevas
Miss JcPenney Style	Corozal - Viviana Ortíz Pastrana
Miss Photogenic	Aguadilla - Paola Giselle Santiago Serrano
Miss Congeniality	Cabo Rojo - Carolina Rodríguez Ruiz
Best National Costume	Toa Alta - Azarel Nadal Torres
Primera Hora's People Choice	Mayagüez - Claudia Marie Ramos Zorrilla

== Casting ==
Casting calls were held throughout Puerto Rico during the summer. Only 40 became the official contestants in an event on July 11, 2009 in Teatro Ambassador in San Juan. During the event five contestants were given the Special Awards of the night:

- Modelling Award: Yanitza Marisol Rivera Rivera - Miss Loiza
- Look Change Award: Amanda Beatriz Sanchez - Miss Coamo
- Best Projection: Viviana Ortiz Pastrana - Miss Corozal

== Contestants ==
40 contestants competed for the title:

Municipality	Contestant	Age	Height
Aguadilla	Paola Giselle Santiago Serrano	22	1.68 m (5 ft 6 in)
Aibonito	Katherine Enid Soliván	18	1.75 m (5 ft 9 in)
Añasco	Enid Méndez Soto	25	1.68 m (5 ft 6 in)
Arecibo	Catherine Paola Roldán Castro	20	1.68 m (5 ft 6 in)
Barceloneta	Ío Rivera Jiménez	24	1.71 m (5 ft 7 1/2 in)
Bayamón	Stephanie Román De León	17	1.83 m (6 ft 0 in)
Cabo Rojo	Carolina Rodríguez Ruiz	24	1.68 m (5 ft 6 in)
Caguas	Ingrid E. Fernández	26	1.70 m (5 ft 7 in)
Canóvanas	Raisa Maite Díaz Carrasquillo	19	1.70 m (5 ft 7 in)
Carolina	Madeline R. Arroyo	18	1.68 m (5 ft 6 in)
Cataño	Valery Vélez Cuevas	20	1.76 m (5 ft 9 1/2 in)
Cayey	Emeline Peña	19	1.73 m (5 ft 8 in)
Ciales	Desirée Del Rio De Jesús	24	1.75 m (5 ft 9 in)
Coamo	Amanda Beatriz Sánchez	20	1.75 m (5 ft 9 in)
Corozal	Viviana Ortíz Pastrana	24	1.76 m (5 ft 9 1/2 in)
Dorado	Sulis Marie Matos Reyes	19	1.73 m (5 ft 8 in)
Guayama	Zuleyka Maril Rodríguez	22	1.68 m (5 ft 6 in)
Guaynabo	Lara Maria Mercado	20	1.68 m (5 ft 6 in)
Gurabo	Jessica Joan Santiago Rodríguez	20	1.78 m (5 ft 10 in)
Hatillo	Adriana Pérez Mercado	18	1.68 m (5 ft 6 in)
Hormigueros	Ninoshka Beatriz Aldea Morales	18	1.68 m (5 ft 6 in)
Humacao	Ashley Beth Pérez Calderón	19	1.72 m (5 ft 7 1/2 in)
Juana Díaz	Lisa Suzette D'Aleccio Molina	24	1.70 m (5 ft 7 in)
Juncos	Verónica Maldonado	20	1.78 m (5 ft 10 in)
Lajas	Itzaira Vélez Pardo	20	1.73 m (5 ft 8 in)
Las Piedras	Kiara Marie Ortiz Rodríguez	18	1.80 m (5 ft 11 in)
Loíza	Yanitza Marisol Rivera Rivera	24	1.70 m (5 ft 7 in)
Luquillo	Letty Joan Pérez Rivera	22	1.73 m (5 ft 8 in)
Mayagüez	Claudia Ramos Zorrilla	22	1.68 m (5 ft 6 in)
Naguabo	Grace Marie García	18	1.73 m (5 ft 8 in)
Naranjito	Jamaris Rolón González	20	1.73 m (5 ft 8 in)
Ponce	Giselle Marie Negrón Rivera	22	1.73 m (5 ft 8 in)
Salinas	Katherine Marie Torres Cartagena	18	1.80 m (5 ft 11 in)
San Juan	Miriam Ivette Pabón Carrión	25	1.70 m (5 ft 7 in)
San Lorenzo	Giovanna Raquel López	19	1.70 m (5 ft 7 in)
Toa Alta	Azarel Nadal Torres	26	1.75 m (5 ft 9 in)
Toa Baja	Dayalí Romero López	20	1.70 m (5 ft 7 in)
Trujillo Alto	Keisy Denisse Blanch Rodríguez	19	1.68 m (5 ft 6 in)
Yabucoa	Génesis Espinosa	17	1.73 m (5 ft 8 in)
Yauco	Angivette Marie Billoch Cintrón	19	1.68 m (5 ft 6 in)

== Notes ==
- Miss Gurabo, Jessica Santiago, competed in America's Next Top Model, Cycle 12, where she finished 12th. Furthermore, she competed in Model Latina, Cycle 3: New York City where she finished as a 1st runner-up.
- Miss San Juan, Miriam Pabón, participated in Miss World Puerto Rico 2008, where she finished as the 3rd runner-up. As the ultimate favorite for Miss World Puerto Rico 2008 she was designated Miss Puerto Rico International 2008. She later competed at Miss International 2008 where she was a finalist. She also competed at Miss America 2010.
- Miss Ciales, Desireé Del Río, later competed at Miss Puerto Rico 2013 representing Cayey. She finished as 2nd runner-up. She represented Puerto Rico at Miss International 2011 and finished as 3rd runner-up. Sha later went on to compete at Miss Supranational 2013 where she placed in Top 20 and won the Miss Photogenic award.
- Miss Toa Alta, Azarel Nadal, previously competed at Miss World Puerto Rico 2009 where she finished as Top 15. She is also a well known top model in Puerto Rico.
- Miss Corozal, Viviana Ortiz, competed at Nuestra Belleza Latina 2013 where she finished as 2nd runner-up.
- Miss Humacao, Ashley Beth Pérez, win the title of Miss Teen Galaxy International 2009. She represented Puerto Rico at Miss International 2013 and finished as Semi-finalist.
- Miss Cataño, Valery Vélez, would later represent Puerto Rico at Miss Supranational 2011
- Miss Bayamón, Stephanie Román, later competed at Miss Universe Puerto Rico 2013 once again representing Bayamón but did not classify and later competed at Miss Universe Puerto Rico 2016 representing Dorado where she finished as 5th Runner-Up.
- Miss Lajas, Itzaira Vélez, later competed at Miss Universe Puerto Rico 2015 once again representing Lajas but did not classify.
- Miss San Lorenzo, Giovanna Lopez, later competed at Miss Universe Puerto Rico 2015 representing Gurabo but did not classify.

=== Historical significance ===
- Corozal won Miss Universe Puerto Rico for the second time, the last was Desiree Lowry in 1995.
- The following municipalities also made the semi-finals last year were Bayamón, Humacao , Barceloneta, and Toa Baja.
- Corozal last placed in 1995.
- Gurabo last placed in 2002.
- Mayagüez and Toa Alta last placed in 2003.
- Loíza last placed in 2005.
- Ponce and San Juan last placed in 2009.
- Ciales, Canóvanas, Guayama, and Gurabo had their first placements.
