= Génesis Dávila =

Puerto Rican beauty pageant titleholder veteran

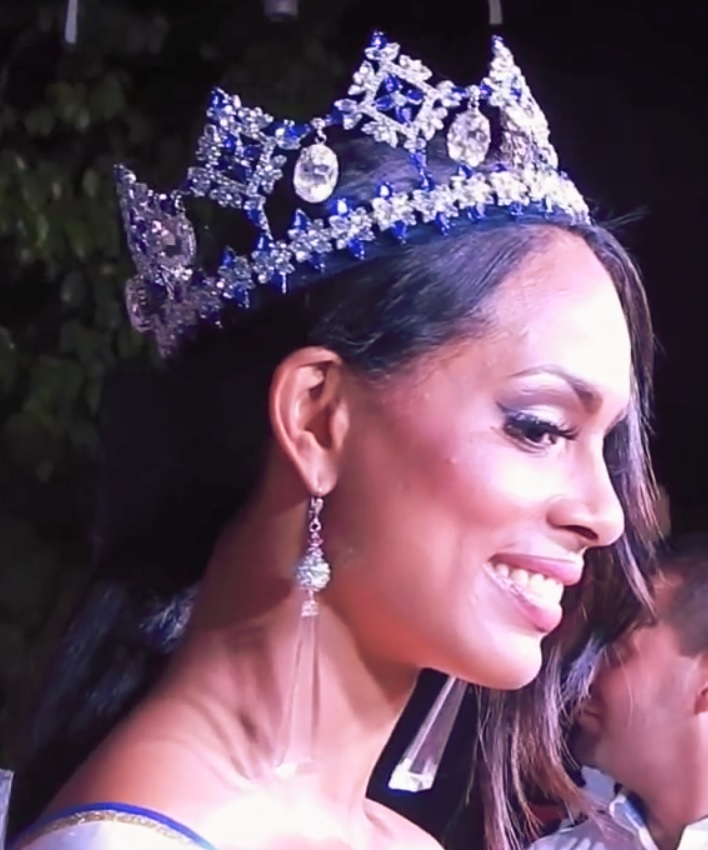
- Génesis Dávila in 2014
- Born: Génesis María Dávila Pérez; November 18, 1990 (age 35); Bayamón, Puerto Rico
- Height: 5 ft 10 in (1.78 m)
- Beauty pageant titleholder
- Title: Miss Intercontinental Puerto Rico 2012; Miss World Puerto Rico 2014; Miss Florida USA 2018
- Hair color: Brown
- Eye color: Brown
- Major competitions: Miss Intercontinental 2012 (1st Runner-Up); Miss Universe Puerto Rico 2013; (1st Runner-Up); Miss World 2014 (Unplaced); Miss USA 2018 (Top 5) Miss Universe Puerto Rico 2024 (Unplaced); Miss Universe Latina, el reality 2025 (1st Runner-Up); Miss Universe Puerto Rico 2026 (1st Runner-Up)

Génesis María Dávila Pérez (born November 18, 1990) is an Afro-Puerto Rican model and beauty pageant titleholder who was crowned Miss World Puerto Rico 2014 and represented Puerto Rico at Miss World 2014 in London.

She was crowned Miss Florida USA 2017 but was disqualified for using outside assistance on hair and makeup.

== Life and career ==
=== Early life ===
Dávila was born in Bayamón, Puerto Rico on November 18, 1990.

=== Pageantry ===
==== Puerto Rican titles ====
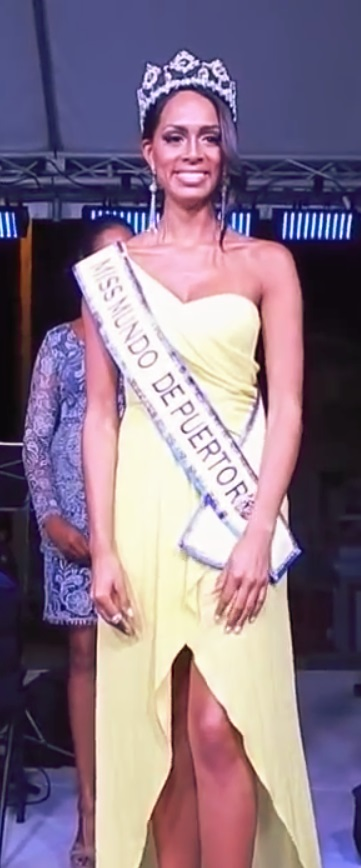
Génesis Dávila as Miss World Puerto Rico 2014 in Arroyo.

==== Miss Universe Puerto Rico 2013 ====
On August 29, 2012, Dávila represented Arroyo at the Miss Universe Puerto Rico 2013 pageant. She ended up finishing as the first runner-up, and won the Best Legs Award. The winner of Miss Universe Puerto Rico 2013 was Monic Pérez, who represented the municipality of Arecibo. As first runner up, Dávila received the right to represent Puerto Rico at Miss Intercontinental 2012. She finished as the first runner-up, and won the title of Miss North America Intercontinental

==== Miss World 2014 ====
On August 13, 2014, Dávila represented Arroyo at Miss World Puerto Rico 2014. She won the competition and also won the Beach Beauty Award. Dávila went on to represent Puerto Rico at Miss World 2014 in London, where she became the first woman of predominantly African heritage to represent Puerto Rico in Miss World but failed to place in the semifinals.

==== Miss Florida USA ====
Dávila represented Miami Beach in the Miss Florida USA 2017 pageant held on July 16, 2016. She ended up winning, and was crowned Miss Florida USA 2017 by outgoing titleholder Brie Gabrielle. Dávila was dethroned on July 22, 2016, after it was revealed that she hired outside hair and makeup professionals during the Miss Florida USA state pageant instead of doing the makeup herself, which is explicitly against pageant rules. The pageant stated they received multiple complaints from eyewitnesses and other contestants, in addition to it giving Dávila an unfair advantage. Dávila later filed a lawsuit against the owners of the Miss Florida USA pageant for $15 million, seeking damages for defamation and a restoration of her crown. The lawsuit was later dismissed in October, with its terms confidential. The following year, Dávila returned to Miss Florida USA, representing Miami, and won the competition yet again. She represented Florida at Miss USA 2018 and made the Top 5.

==== Miss Universe Puerto Rico 2024 ====
In June 2024, Dávila once again competed in Miss Universe Puerto Rico representing her hometown of Arroyo. Despite being a heavy favorite and front runner, Dávila failed to place in the semifinals.

== See also ==
- Miss Universe Puerto Rico 2013

Awards and achievements
Preceded by Nadyalee Torres (Caguas)	Miss Mundo de Puerto Rico; 2014	Succeeded by Keysi Vargas (Quebradillas)
Preceded by N/A	Miss Arroyo Mundo; 2014	Succeeded by
Preceded by Chanty Vargas (San Juan)	Miss Intercontinental Puerto Rico; 2012	Succeeded by Aleyda Ortiz (Bayamón)
Preceded by Jennifer Guevara	Miss Arroyo Universe; 2013	Succeeded by Niomi Cora
Preceded by Brie Gabrielle	Miss Florida USA; 2017 (Dethroned)	Succeeded by Linette De Los Santos
Preceded by Linette De Los Santos	Miss Florida USA; 2018	Succeeded by Nicolette Jennings
Preceded by Alexandra Rivera	Miss Arroyo Universe; 2024	Succeeded by Incumbent
