= Ana Nisi Goyco =

Puerto Rican politician and beauty pageant titleholder

Ana Nisi Goyco Graziani

Member of the Puerto Rico Senate from the Ponce district
- In office 1980–1992

Personal details
- Born: March 9, 1951 Ponce, Puerto Rico
- Died: February 8, 2019 (aged 68) Ponce, Puerto Rico
- Party: Popular Democratic Party
- Spouse: None
- Children: 0

Ana Nisi Goyco Graziani (March 9, 1951, in Ponce, Puerto Rico – February 8, 2019, in Ponce, Puerto Rico) was a Puerto Rican politician, senator, pharmacist and beauty pageant titleholder. She won the Miss World Puerto Rico beauty pageant in 1972 and represented Puerto Rico in Miss World 1972 in London. Goyco then served as a member of the Senate of Puerto Rico from 1980 to 1992. Goyco died on February 8, 2019.
