= Bodine Koehler =

Beauty pageant titleholder

Bodine Koehler Peña
- Born: September 30, 1992 (age 34); Amsterdam, Netherlands
- Height: 1.83 m (6 ft 0 in)
- Beauty pageant titleholder
- Title: Miss Río Grande Universe 2012; Miss Universe Puerto Rico 2012
- Hair color: Brown
- Eye color: Brown
- Major competitions: Miss Universe Puerto Rico 2012 (Winner) (Best Figure Award) (Payless Best Catwalk Award) (JcPenney Style Award); Miss Universe 2012 (Unplaced)

Bodine Koehler Peña (born September 30, 1992) is a Dutch-born Puerto Rican musician, model and beauty pageant titleholder who represented the municipality of Río Grande at the Miss Universe Puerto Rico 2012 pageant and represented Puerto Rico at the Miss Universe 2012 pageant.

== Early life ==
Koehler was born on September 30, 1992 in Amsterdam, Netherlands to a Dutch father and a Dominican mother. Koehler moved to Puerto Rico when she was 8 years old and was raised in San Juan. She speaks Spanish, Dutch, and English fluently, and is one of the most well-known models on the island. Koehler also plays the piano.

She is the second cousin of Miss World 1959, Corine Rottschäfer.

== Miss Universe Puerto Rico 2012 ==
On November 7, 2011, Koehler represented Río Grande at Miss Universe Puerto Rico 2012 and beat out 38 other contestants for the title, gaining the right to represent Puerto Rico at Miss Universe.

=== Controversy ===
During her reign, Koehler and the Miss Universe Puerto Rico Organization were ridiculed for the fact that Koehler was of Dominican Republic and Dutch descent, not Puerto Rican. Pageant rules state that in order to compete participants must be citizens of Puerto Rico who have lived there for at least six months. Koehler was born in the Netherlands and moved to Puerto Rico at age 8.

== Miss Universe 2012 ==
On December 19, 2012, Koehler represented Puerto Rico at Miss Universe 2012 where she competed to succeed Leila Lopes of Angola. Although considered a big favorite and a front runner, she did not reach a place in the Top 16.

== See also ==
- Miss Universe Puerto Rico 2012

Awards and achievements
Preceded by Viviana Ortiz (Corozal)	Miss Universe Puerto Rico; 2012	Succeeded by Monic Pérez (Arecibo)
Preceded by Mariana Vicente	Miss Río Grande Universe; 2012	Succeeded by Larissa Santiago
