= Eli Fantasy =

- Also known as: Fantasy
- Born: Elinnette Rodriguez Calderín; October 14, 1994 (age 31); Yauco, Puerto Rico
- Origin: Yauco, Puerto Rico
- Genres: Reggaeton; trap
- Occupations: Singer; songwriter; model; dancer
- Years active: 2017–present
- Label: Interscope
- Website: www.elifantasy.com

Elinnette Rodríguez Calderín (Yauco, Puerto Rico, October 14, 1994), stage name Eli Fantasy, is a Puerto Rican urban singer, songwriter, model, and dancer. Eliennette represented her native Yauco at the Miss Universe Puerto Rico pageant in 2015, where she won the Miss Amistad award.

In 2018, she was in at least two music videos.

In 2017, she released her second single "No soy como tu" and "Noche Inolvidable". At the end of 2017, she recorded "Desquitarnos Bailando".

In 2019, Eli Fantasy signed with Interscope Records, releasing the first single under the label titled; Si toca toca on 2020.

She was arrested in the state of Florida (USA) in May 2022 on 8 years for armed robbery, charges punishable by up to eight years in prison.

== Singles ==
- La Peseta - 2017
- No soy como tú - 2018
- Noche Inolvidable- 2018
- Más perra que yo - 2018
- Desquitarnos bailando (2018)
- Braty Puti - 2019 (feat. Tomasa del Real)
- Si Toca Toca - 2020,
