= Gabriela Berríos =

Puerto Rican beauty pageant titleholder

Gabriela Berríos Pagán
- Born: Gabriela Berríos Pagán; November 30, 1990 (age 35); San Juan, Puerto Rico
- Height: 1.75 m (5 ft 9 in)
- Beauty pageant titleholder
- Title: Miss Latin International 2010; Miss Tourism Intercontinental 2010; Miss Toa Alta Universe 2012; Miss Supranational Puerto Rico 2012; Miss Toa Baja Universe 2014; Miss Universe Puerto Rico 2014
- Hair color: Brown
- Eye color: Green
- Major competitions: Miss Latin International US 2010 (Winner); Miss Tourism Intercontinental 2010 (Winner); Miss Universe Puerto Rico 2012 (2nd Runner-Up) (Miss Supranational Puerto Rico 2012) (Winner); Miss Supranational 2012 (Top 10); Miss Universe Puerto Rico 2014 (Winner); Miss Universe 2014 (Unplaced) (Miss Photogenic); Miss International 2016 (Unplaced)

Gabriela Berríos Pagán (born November 30, 1990) is a Puerto Rican former model and beauty pageant titleholder. She represented Toa Baja municipality at Miss Universe Puerto Rico 2014 and represented Puerto Rico at Miss Universe 2014 held in Doral, Florida. She also represented Puerto Rico at Miss International 2016.

== Early life ==
Berríos was born on November 30, 1990, in San Juan, Puerto Rico. She was raised in Carolina and moved to Florida after her parents divorced. She initially studied business administration at Kaplan University but as of 2020 studies healthcare administration at University of Central Florida.

Berríos and her older sister Julianna started Sweets by Sisters, Inc., a bakery specializing in extravagantly-decorated cakes, in 2019, but it wasn't until the initial COVID-19 stay-at-home orders that they were able to turn their focus to growing their business. She confirmed in 2020 in an interview with Epiko Magazine that she had retired from pageantry.

== Pageantry ==
Year	Pageant	Outcome	Notes	References
2010	Miss Latina InternationalUSA	Winner		
2010	Miss Tourism Intercontinental	Winner		
2012	La Musa de Carlos Alberto	Winner		
2012	Miss Universe Puerto Rico	Runner-up	Represented Toa Baja; Won Most Beautiful Face Award	
2012	Miss Supranational	Top 10		
2014	Miss Universe Puerto Rico	Winner	Represented Toa Baja; Won Payless Best Catwalk, Best Legs, Miss Sears Best Style	
2014	Miss Universe	Unplaced	Won Miss Photogenic	
2016	Miss International	Unplaced		

=== Miss Universe 2014 ===
Berríos represented Puerto Rico at Miss Universe 2014 where she competed to succeed the current titleholder, Gabriela Isler of Venezuela. Although considered to be a strong candidate by many, she failed to place in the Top 15. She did however win the award for Miss Photogenic and fainted during a commercial break before Paulina Vega of Colombia was crowned Miss Universe.

=== Miss International 2016 ===
Berríos was chosen to represent Puerto Rico at Miss International 2016 where Edymar Martínez from Venezuela crowned her successor Kylie Vervosa of the Philippines at the end of the event. She did not reach the top 15 in the pageant.

Awards and achievements
Preceded by Wilmary Monción Román	Miss International Puerto Rico; 2016	Succeeded by Beverly Rodríguez
Preceded by (Poland) Paulina Krupińska	Miss Photogenic Universe; 2014	Succeeded by (New Zealand) Samantha McClung
Preceded by Monic Pérez (Arecibo)	Miss Universe Puerto Rico; 2014	Succeeded by Catalina Morales (Guaynabo)
Preceded by Marla Delgado	Miss Toa Baja Universe; 2014	Succeeded by Nicole Ferrer
Preceded by Valery Vélez (Cataño)	Miss Supranational Puerto Rico; 2012	Succeeded by Desiree del Río (Cayey)
Preceded by Azarel Nadal	Miss Toa Alta Universe; 2012	Succeeded by Ariana Díaz
