= Kristhielee Caride =

Puerto Rican pageant titleholder (born 1991)

- Born: Kristhielee Yinaira Caride Santiago; July 8, 1991 (age 35); Bayamón, Puerto Rico
- Education: University of Puerto Rico, Río Piedras Campus (BA)
- Height: 1.77 m (5 ft 10 in)
- Beauty pageant titleholder
- Title: Miss Dorado Universe 2014; Miss Isabela Universe 2016; Miss Universe Puerto Rico 2016
- Hair color: Brown
- Eye color: Brown
- Major competitions: Miss Puerto Rico Universe 2014 (Top 16); Miss Puerto Rico Universe 2016 (Winner) (Dethroned)

Kristhielee Yinaira Caride Santiago also known as Kristhielee Caride (born 8 July 1991) is a Puerto Rican actress, teacher, athlete, model and beauty pageant titleholder who won the title of Miss Puerto Rico Universe 2016.

Caride was appointed to represent Puerto Rico at Miss Universe 2016, until she was dethroned from the title. The decision was effective on 17 March 2016 by the Miss Universe Puerto Rico Organization. Caride challenged the decision in the Puerto Rico court, which ruled against her on 13 September 2016.

== Career ==
Caride was born in Bayamón, Puerto Rico and earned a bachelor's degree from the University of Puerto Rico (Río Piedras Campus) majoring in Theater Education and Drama.

== Pageantry ==
=== Miss Universe Puerto Rico ===
Kristhielee competed in the Miss Universe Puerto Rico 2014 pageant representing the municipality of Dorado where she earned a placement as one of the Top 16 finalist. Caride later competed in Miss Universe Puerto Rico 2016 representing the municipality of Isabela where she won the pageant.

==== Dethronement ====
On 17 March 2016, national director Desiree Lowry announced on national television that Caride had been stripped of her title after a controversial interview between Caride and Venezuelan entertainment reporter Patricia Vargas. According to the holders of the Miss Universe Puerto Rico Organization, Lowry and Luis Vigoreaux, the reason for her dismissal was that she was not feeling well due to a personal incident occurred that morning with her family and she did not wanted to be interviewed on camera at that specific time.

Caride later wrote a public letter apologizing to the journalist and explained to the organization she had been going through personal problems and was having a difficult day. Shortly afterwards, Lowry and the organization's franchise owner Luisito Vigoreaux issued a press release claiming that because Caride was not fulfilling her contractual obligations as Miss Universe Puerto Rico 2016 by missing multiple public appearances she would be replaced by Miss Universe Puerto Rico 2016 first runner-up Brenda Jiménez.

On 13 September 2016, the Puerto Rican court announced its decision ruling against Caride and her claim to the crown and title. Her crown and title were forfeited and awarded to first runner-up Brenda Jiménez of Aguadilla to represent at Miss Universe 2016.

Awards and achievements
Preceded by Catalina Morales (Guaynabo)	Miss Puerto Rico Universe; 2016 (Dethroned)	Succeeded by Brenda Jiménez (Aguadilla)
