= Brenda Jiménez =

Puerto Rican pageant titleholder (born 1994)

- Born: Brenda Azaria Jiménez Hernández; December 10, 1994 (age 31); Mayagüez, Puerto Rico
- Education: University of Puerto Rico (BS)
- Occupation: Model
- Height: 1.76 m (5 ft 9 in)
- Beauty pageant titleholder
- Title: Miss Universe Puerto Rico 2016
- Hair color: Brown
- Eye color: Brown
- Major competitions: Miss Universe Puerto Rico 2016; (Winner; Assumed) (Note: Jiménez was originally first runner-up, but became Miss Universe Puerto Rico 2016 after the original titleholder, Kristhielee Caride, was dethroned); Miss Universe 2016; (Unplaced); Miss Grand International 2017; (3rd Runner-Up)

Brenda Azaria Jiménez Hernández (born December 10, 1994) is a Puerto Rican model and beauty pageant titleholder. She was appointed as Miss Puerto Rico Universe 2016 on March 17, 2016, after the original titleholder, Kristhielee Caride, had the title removed.

== Early life ==
Jiménez was raised in Mayagüez. She studied and graduated in Biology and Psychology at the University of Puerto Rico. She wanted to become a neonatal pediatrician.

== Pageantry ==
=== Miss Universe Puerto Rico 2016 ===
Jiménez competed in Miss Universe Puerto Rico 2016 on November 12, 2015, representing the municipality of Aguadilla, where she finished as first runner-up to Kristhielee Caride of Isabela. Four months later, on March 17, 2016, the Miss Universe Puerto Rico organization announced that Caride had been stripped of her title after failing to fulfil her obligations and, as first runner-up, Jiménez would take over the responsibilities.

=== Miss Universe 2016 ===
Jiménez represented Puerto Rico at the Miss Universe 2016 pageant at the Mall of Asia Arena in the Philippines. She was a non-semifinalist.

=== Miss Grand International 2017 ===
Jiménez also represented Puerto Rico at Miss Grand International 2017 in Vietnam, where she finished third runner-up to María José Lora of Peru.

== Filmography ==
| Year | Title | Role | Notes |
|---|---|---|---|
| 2016 | ¡Viva la Tarde! | Special guest | |
| 2016 | Lo Sé Todo | Special guest | |

== Notes ==
Awards and achievements
| Preceded by Kristhielee Caride (Isabela) (Dethroned) | Miss Puerto Rico Universe; 2016 | Succeeded by Danna Hernández (San Juan) |
| Preceded by Natalie Marrero | Miss Aguadilla Universe; 2016 | Succeeded by Tayra Liz |
