= Nadyalee Torres =

Puerto Rican model and beauty pageant titleholder

- Born: May 8, 1988 (age 38); Aguas Buenas, Puerto Rico
- Education: Bayamón Central University
- Height: 5 ft 9 in (1.75 m)
- Beauty pageant titleholder
- Title: Miss Mundo de Puerto Rico 2013
- Years active: 2011–present
- Hair color: Brown
- Eye color: Brown
- Major competitions: Miss Mundo de Puerto Rico 2013 (Winner) (Miss Talent); Miss World 2013 (Unplaced); Nuestra Belleza Latina 2015 (11th Place)

Nadyalee Torres López (born May 8, 1988) is a Puerto Rican model and beauty pageant titleholder who was crowned Miss World Puerto Rico 2013. she represented Puerto Rico at Miss World 2013 but unplaced.

== Pageantry ==
=== Miss Mundo de Puerto Rico 2013 ===
On April 24, 2013, Nadyalee competed in the Miss Mundo de Puerto Rico 2013 pageant representing the municipality of Caguas where she won the title and she also won the Talent competition in an event held prior to the final night of the pageant.

=== Miss World 2013 ===
Nadyalee represented Puerto Rico at the Miss World 2013 pageant held on September 28, 2013, in Bali, Indonesia.

Awards and achievements
Preceded by Janelee Chaparro (Barceloneta)	Miss Mundo de Puerto Rico; 2013	Succeeded by Genesis Davila (Arroyo)
