= Miss World 1975 =

25th Miss World pageant

- Wilnelia Merced
- Date: 20 November 1975
- Presenters: David Vine; Ray Moore
- Venue: Royal Albert Hall, London, United Kingdom
- Broadcaster: BBC
- Entrants: 67
- Placements: 15
- Debuts: Curaçao; El Salvador; Haiti; Saint Lucia; Swaziland
- Withdrawals: Botswana; Ecuador; Jamaica; Madagascar; Spain; Zambia
- Returns: Bolivia; Cuba; Iceland; Luxembourg; Mauritius; Peru; Seychelles; Trinidad and Tobago; Tunisia; Turkey; Uruguay
- Winner: Wilnelia Merced; Puerto Rico
- Congeniality: Maggie Siew; Singapore
- Photogenic: Vinah Thembi Mamba; Swaziland

Miss World 1975 was the 25th edition of the Miss World pageant, held at the Royal Albert Hall in London, United Kingdom on 20 November 1975.

At the end of the event, Anneline Kriel of South Africa crowned Wilnelia Merced of Puerto Rico as Miss World 1975. It was the first time Puerto Rico won Miss World. Marina Langer of Germany finished as first runner-up, while Vicki Harris of the United Kingdom finished as second runner-up.

Contestants from sixty-seven countries and territories participated in this pageant. David Vine and Ray Moore hosted the pageant.

== Background ==
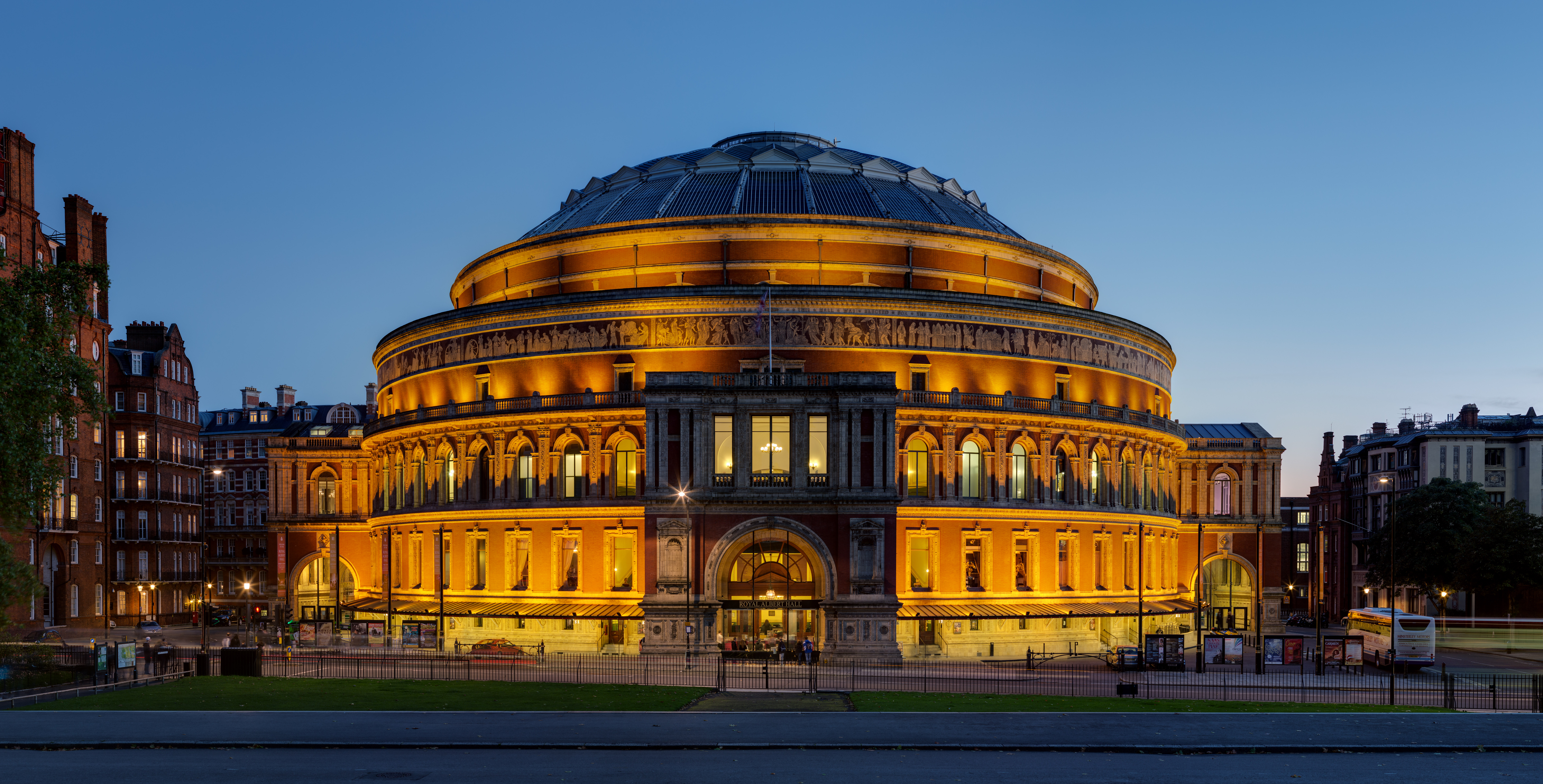
Royal Albert Hall, the location of Miss World 1975

=== Selection of participants ===
Participants from sixty-seven countries and territories were chosen to compete in the pageant. Seven contestants were appointed to represent their countries/territories after placing as runners-up in their national pageants, or were selected through a casting process, and three contestants were appointed after the original delegates withdrew.

Beginning with this edition, the Miss World Organization banned mothers from participating in the pageant. This followed Helen Morgan's sudden resignation as Miss World the previous year due to intense media interest that had a negative impact on her.

==== Replacements ====
Anna Vitale of Italy was originally scheduled to compete in this edition. However, after discovering that her mother had fallen suddenly ill, Vitale decided to withdraw from the competition. She was replaced by Vanna Bortolini. Miss Finland 1975 first runner-up Merja Tammi was originally scheduled to compete in this edition. However, after winning Miss Young International 1975 in August, Leena Kaarina Vainio was sent as her replacement instead.

Miss South Africa 1975 Helga Vera Johns was initially set to represent South Africa. However, it was discovered that Johns was from Rhodesia, which was not recognized by the United Kingdom, and Johns had lived in South Africa for only three years. Because this violated the Miss World rule stating that a candidate must have lived in the country she represents for no less than five years, Julia Morley decided to disqualify Johns. Although disqualified, Johns was still kept as a guest of the Morleys. Miss World organizers sent Johns's two Miss South Africa runners-up, Crystal Coopers and Rhoda Rademeyer. Coopers was originally supposed to replace Johns as South Africa's representative at Miss World, but her father did not allow it after learning that Johns would still retain the title of Miss South Africa. Because of this, Rademeyer became South Africa's representative at Miss World.

==== Debuts, returns, and withdrawals ====
Curaçao, El Salvador, Haiti, Saint Lucia, and Swaziland competed for the first time. Returning to this edition were Cuba, which last competed in 1955; Bolivia and Uruguay, which both last competed in 1965; Trinidad and Tobago and Tunisia, which both last competed in 1971; and Iceland, Luxembourg, Mauritius, Peru, Seychelles, and Turkey, which all last competed in 1973.

Botswana, Ecuador, Spain, Jamaica, Madagascar, and Zambia did not compete in this edition. Lucy Mosinyi of Botswana and Karen Andrea Hollihan of Ecuador did not compete due to a lack of funds to send them to London. Lydia Malcolm of Jamaica did not compete because Miss World did not recognize the organization that chose Malcolm as the official holder of Jamaica's franchise at Miss World. Brenda May of Zambia did not compete due to undisclosed reasons. Olga Fernández of Spain did not compete after mourning the death of Spanish President Francisco Franco. Due to her withdrawal, the BBC had to edit her out of the pre-recorded video of the parade of nations for this edition.

Diana Anker of Guatemala, Anina Horta of Panama, María Angela Medina Monjagata of Paraguay, and Raquel Argandoña of Chile were expected to compete, but they did not show up in London.

== Results ==
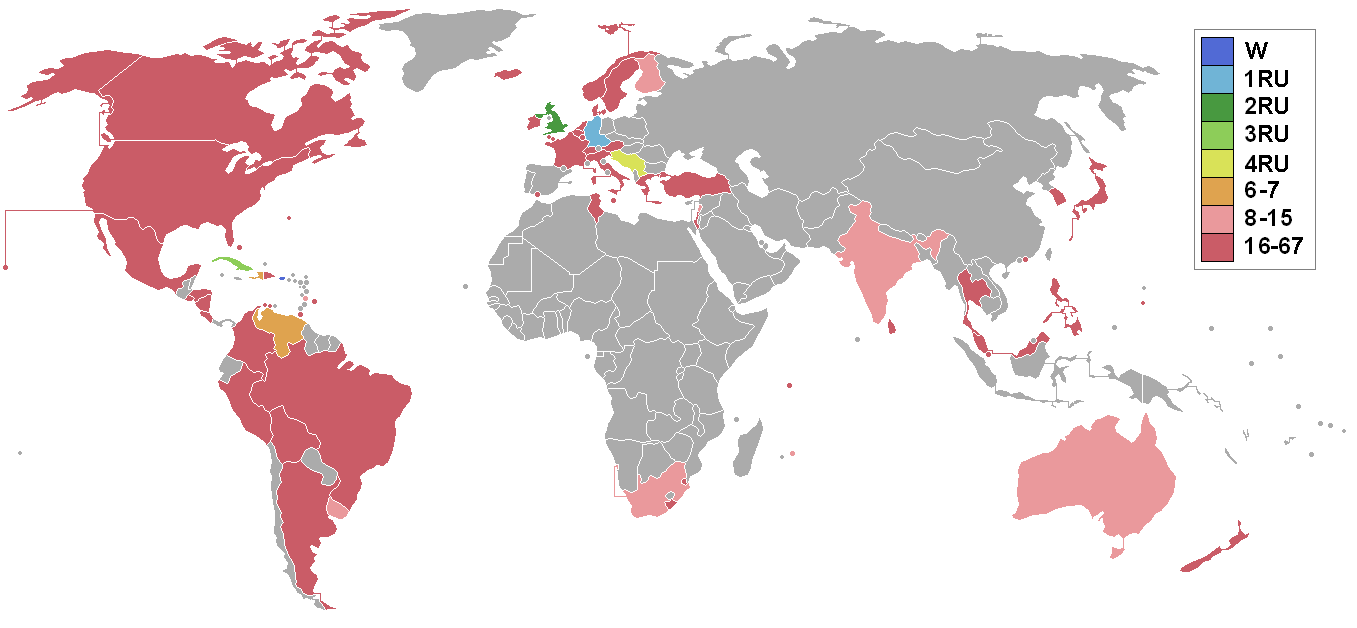
Countries and territories which participated in Miss World 1975 and their placements.

=== Placements ===
Placement	Contestant
Miss World 1975	Puerto Rico – Wilnelia Merced
1st runner-up	Germany – Marina Langner
2nd runner-up	United Kingdom – Vicki Harris
3rd runner-up	Cuba – Maricela Clark
4th runner-up	Yugoslavia – Lidija Velkovska
Top 7	Haiti – Joelle Apollon; Venezuela – María Conchita Alonso
Top 15	Australia – Anne Davidson; Finland – Leena Vainio; India – Anjana Sood; Lebanon – Ramona Keram; Mauritius – Mariella Tse-Sik-Sun; Saint Lucia – Sophia St Omer; South Africa – Rhoda Rademeyer; Uruguay – Carmen Abal

=== Special awards ===
Award	Contestant
Miss Congeniality	Singapore – Maggie Siew
Miss Photogenic	(Eswatini) Swaziland – Vinah Thembi Mamba

== Pageant ==
=== Format ===
As in 1961, fifteen semi-finalists were chosen through a preliminary competition held on the day of the final competition, which consisted of the swimsuit and evening gown competitions. The fifteen semi-finalists competed in the swimsuit and evening gown competitions, and seven finalists were subsequently chosen to compete in the final interview.

=== Selection committee ===
- John Conteh – English boxer
- Susan George – English actress
- Kiki Håkansson – Miss World 1951 from Sweden
- Richard Johnson – English actor
- Linda Lewis – English singer
- Sir James Mancham – Prime Minister of Seychelles
- Eric Morley – Chairman of Mecca and founder of Miss World
- Nyree Dawn Porter – Actress from New Zealand
- Oliver Reed – English actor

== Contestants ==
Sixty-seven contestants competed for the title.

Country/Territory	Contestant	Age (Note: Ages at the time of the pageant)	Hometown
Argentina	Lilian Noemi De Asti	19	Buenos Aires
Aruba	Cynthia Bruin	18	Oranjestad
Australia	Anne Davidson	21	Croydon
Austria	Rosemarie Holzschuh	21	Kitzbuhel
(The Bahamas) Bahamas	Ava Burke	17	Nassau
Barbados	Peta Greaves	20	Bridgetown
Belgium	Christine Delmelle	18	Liège
Bermuda	Donna Wright	22	St. David's
Bolivia	María Mónica Guardia	18	Cochabamba
Brazil	Zaida Costa	21	Bahía
Canada	Normande Jacques	22	Blind River
Colombia	Amanda Correa	21	Guajira
Costa Rica	María Mayela Bolaños	17	San José
Cuba	Maricela Clark	22	Santiago de Cuba
Curaçao	Elvira Bakker	21	Willemstad
Denmark	Pia Isa Lauridsen	22	Copenhagen
Dominican Republic	Carmen Rosa Arredondo	19	Santo Domingo
El Salvador	Ana Stella Comas	18	San Salvador
Finland	Leena Vainio	23	Helsinki
France	Sophie Perin	18	Talange
Germany	Marina Langner	22	Düsseldorf
Gibraltar	Lillian Anne Lara	23	Gibraltar
Greece	Bella Adamopoulou	20	Athens
Guam	Dora Camacho	20	Agana
Guernsey	Carol Le Billon	17	Saint Peter Port
Haiti	Joelle Apollon	20	Port-au-Prince
Honduras	Etelinda Mejía	19	Yoro
Hong Kong	Teresa Chu	22	Hong Kong
Iceland	Halldóra Björk Jónsdóttir	22	Reykjavík
India	Anjana Sood	19	Shimla
(Republic of Ireland) Ireland	Elaine Rosemary O'Hara	20	Dublin
Israel	Atida Mor	19	–
Italy	Vanna Bortolini	22	–
Japan	Chiharu Fujiwara	20	Toyama
Jersey	Susan Maxwell de Gruchy	21	Saint Helier
Lebanon	Ramona Karam	20	Beirut
Luxembourg	Marie Therese Manderschied	19	Tétange
Malaysia	Siti Fauziah Haron	19	Johor
Malta	Marie Grace Ciantar	18	Kalkara
Mauritius	Marielle Tse Sik-Sun	23	Port Louis
Mexico	Blanca Patricia López	19	Jalisco
Netherlands	Barbara Ann Neefs	17	Utrecht
New Zealand	Janet Nugent	20	Palmerston North
Nicaragua	María Auxiliadora Paguaga Mantilla	19	Managua
Norway	Sissel Gulbrandsen	23	–
Peru	Mary Orfanides	22	Lima
Philippines	Suzanne Gonzalez	17	Manila
Puerto Rico	Wilnelia Merced	18	Caguas
Saint Lucia	Sophia St. Omer	19	Castries
Seychelles	Amelie Michel	17	Victoria
Singapore	Maggie Siew	21	Singapore
South Africa	Lydia Gloria Johnstone (Note: Black representative from South Africa competed as Miss Africa South in the pageant)	21	–
South Africa	Rhoda Rademeyer	20	Pretoria
South Korea	Lee Sung-hee	19	Seoul
Sri Lanka	Angela Seneviratne	17	Colombo
(Eswatini) Swaziland	Vinah Thembi Mamba	25	Mbabane
Sweden	Agneta Magnusson	20	Stockholm
Switzerland	Franziska Angst	20	Bern
Thailand	Raevadee Pattamaphong	18	Bangkok
Trinidad and Tobago	Donna Sandra Dalrymple	19	Port of Spain
Tunisia	Monia Dida	20	Tunis
Turkey	Harika Degirmenci	22	Istanbul
United States	Annelise Ilschenko	17	Middleburg Heights
Uruguay	Carmen Abal	22	Montevideo
Venezuela	María Conchita Alonso	20	Caracas
Yugoslavia	Lidija Velkovska	19	Skopje
