= Monic Pérez =

Puerto Rican beauty pageant titleholder (born 1990)

- Born: Monic Marie Pérez Díaz; February 1, 1990 (age 36); Bayamón, Puerto Rico
- Education: University of Puerto Rico, Arecibo (BSN)
- Height: 1.78 m (5 ft 10 in)
- Spouse: Sean Einhaus (m. 2019)
- Children: 3
- Beauty pageant titleholder
- Title: Miss Arecibo Universe 2013; Miss Universe Puerto Rico 2013
- Hair color: Dark Brown
- Eye color: Brown
- Major competitions: Miss Universe Puerto Rico 2013 (Winner) (Miss Photogenic) (Payless Best Catwalk) (Best Body); Miss Universe 2013 (Top 16)

Monic Marie Pérez Díaz (born February 1, 1990) is a Puerto Rican tv host, model and beauty pageant titleholder who won Miss Universe Puerto Rico 2013 and represented Puerto Rico at Miss Universe 2013 in Moscow and placed Top 16.

== Early life ==
Monic was born on February 1, 1990, in Bayamón, Puerto Rico, the oldest of three children, and moved to Long Island as a teenager. After high school she moved to Arecibo, Puerto Rico where she attended University of Puerto Rico, Arecibo campus, majoring in Nursing.

== Miss Universe Puerto Rico 2013 ==
On August 29, 2012, Monic represented Arecibo at the Miss Universe Puerto Rico 2013 pageant where she beat out 31 other contestants and won the title, gaining the right to represent Puerto Rico at Miss Universe. She also won the awards of Miss Photogenic, Payless Best Catwalk and Best Body, respectively.

== Miss Universe 2013 ==
Monic represented Puerto Rico at the 62nd annual Miss Universe. She quickly became the crowd favorite and in most countries was the predicted winner of the Miss Universe. She finished as Top 16 semi-finalist on November 9, 2013, vying to succeed outgoing titleholder Miss Universe 2012, Olivia Culpo of the United States. The eventual winner was Gabriela Isler of Venezuela.

== See also ==
- Miss Universe Puerto Rico 2013

Awards and achievements
Preceded by Bodine Koehler (Río Grande)	Miss Universe Puerto Rico; 2013	Succeeded by Gabriela Berríos (Toa Baja)
Preceded by Pao Castro	Miss Arecibo Universe; 2013	Succeeded by Suzette Rivera
