= Miss Earth Puerto Rico =

- Formation: 2001
- Type: Beauty pageant
- Headquarters: San Juan
- Location: Puerto Rico
- Members: Miss Earth; Miss Global
- Official language: Spanish
- National Directors: Vanessa De Roide; Joe Amhed (2018)

Miss Earth Puerto Rico (previously called Miss Puerto Rico) is a beauty pageant that selects Puerto Rico's official representative to Miss Earth—one of the Big Four international beauty pageants.

== History ==
The Miss Puerto Rico Universe organization sent representatives to Miss Earth from 2001 to 2004. From 2005 to 2013, Puerto Rico's representative to Miss Earth was selected through the Miss Puerto Rico Earth pageant. Puerto Rico did not compete in 2007–2008, 2013 and 2015–2016. Nellys Pimentel made history by becoming the first Puerto Rican to win Miss Earth in 2019.

== Titleholders ==
The following titleholders have represented Puerto Rico in three of the Big Four major international beauty pageants for women.

Color key

- Declared as Winner
- Ended as runner-up
- Ended as one of the finalists or semifinalists

=== Representative to Miss Earth ===
Year	Miss Earth Puerto Rico	Municipality	Placement	Special award(s)	Ref.
2027	Isabella Catherina González Dapena	Ponce	TBA		
2026	Cristina Mariel Ríos Reyes (Note: Appointed as Miss Earth Puerto Rico 2026. Previously competed at the virtual edition of Miss Earth 2021, where she was unplaced.)	San Sebastián	TBA		
2025	No Representative				
2025	Cecilia Acosta Conley	Río Grande	Withdrew		
2025	Valeria Meléndez Oyola	Caguas	Withdrew		
2024	Bianca Nicole Miranda Caraballo	Mayagüez	Top 8 (Runner-Up)	Vonwelt Nature Farm Ambassadress	
2023	Victoria Alejandra Arocho del Valle	Caguas	Top 12		
2022	Paulina Nicole Avilés-Feshold	Carolina	Top 8	(silver) Long Gown Competition (Air Group); (silver) Resort Wear Competition (Air Group); Miss Flavor Cartel	
2021	Cristina Mariel Ríos Reyes	San Sebastián	Unplaced	(gold) Casual Chic Competition; (bronze) Long Gown Competition	
2020	Krystal Badillo Pagan	Canóvanas	Top 8	(silver) Long Gown (America)	
2019	Nellys Rocio Pimentel Campusano	San Juan	Miss Earth 2019	(silver) Swimsuit (Water); (silver) Long Gown (Water) Miss Earth Flora	
2018	Krystal Xamairy Rivera Barrios	Arecibo	Unplaced	Miss Pontefino Hotel; (bronze) Talent (Water group)	
2017	Karla Victoria Aponte Colón	San Juan	Unplaced	Miss JACMI; (gold) Swimsuit (Group 3); (gold) Long Gown (Group 3); (gold) Eco-Video Presentation	
2016	No Representative				
2015	No Representative				
2014	Franceska Toro Medina	Toa Baja	Unplaced	Miss Advance; Miss Psalmstre; M.E Eco-Beauty Video; (bronze) Darling of the Press; (bronze) Cocktail Wear; (bronze) Resort Wear; Top Model of the World 2016 (1st runner - up)	
2013	Velmary Paola Cabassa Vélez	San Juan	Did not compete		
2012	Darli Arni Pacheco Montañez	Toa Baja	Unplaced	(gold) Miss Talent (Group 1); (gold) Liter of Light Project Campaign (Group 1); (gold) Resort Wear (Group 1); (gold) Swimsuit (Group 1)	
2011	Agnes Eileen Benítez Santiago	Bayamón	Unplaced		
2010	Yeidy Enid Bosques Pérez	Mayagüez	Miss Fire (Runner-Up)		
2009	Dignelis Taymí Jiménez Hernández	Arecibo	Unplaced	Placenta Award	
2008	No Representative				
2007	No Representative				
2006	Camille Collazo Ortiz	San Juan	Unplaced		
2005	Vanessa De Roide Toledo	Carolina	Top 8	Best in Long Gown; Miss Pond's	
2004	Shanira Blanco Colón	San Juan	Unplaced	Miss Leonardo	
2003	Norelis Ortiz Acosta	Gurabo	Unplaced		
2002	Deidre Rodríguez Santiago	Santa Isabel	Unplaced		
2001	Amaricelys Reyes Guzmán	Isabela	Unplaced		

=== Representative to Miss Global ===
Year	Miss Global Puerto Rico	Municipality	Placement	Special awards	Ref.
2027	Anaysa Soto Cortés	Moca	TBA		
2026	Bianca Nicole Miranda Caraballo	Mayagüez	2nd Runner-Up	Miss Photogenic	
2026	Gabriela Vázquez Pomales	Salinas	Withdrew		
2025	Ediris Joan Rivera Berrios	Barranquitas	2nd Runner-Up		
2023	Ashley Meléndez Ríos	Fajardo	Miss Global 2023		

== See also ==
- Miss Puerto Rico
