= Miss Puerto Rico Universe 2010 =

55th Annual Miss Universe Puerto Rico pageant

- Date: November 12, 2009
- Presenters: Luisito Vigoreaux; Zuleyka Rivera; Rashel Diaz
- Entertainment: Víctor Manuelle; Jencarlos Canela
- Venue: Centro De Bellas Artes Luis A. Ferré, San Juan, Puerto Rico
- Broadcaster: Telemundo
- Entrants: 39
- Placements: 20
- Winner: Mariana Vicente; Río Grande

Miss Puerto Rico Universe 2010 was the 55th Miss Puerto Rico Universe pageant, held at the Centro De Bellas Artes Luis A. Ferré in San Juan, Puerto Rico, on November 12, 2009.

Mayra Matos crowned Mariana Vicente at the end of the event. Vicente represented Puerto Rico at the Miss Universe 2010 pageant, and placed in the Top 10.

== Results ==
=== Placements ===
Placement	Contestant
Miss Universe Puerto Rico 2010	Río Grande– Mariana Paola Vicente
1st Runner-Up	Carolina – Ariana Rodriguez
2nd Runner-Up	Cayey – Aideliz Hidalgo
3rd Runner-Up	Mayagüez – Yeidy Bosques
4th Runner-Up	Hatillo – Coral Del Mar Casanova
Top 10	Barceloneta – Zuleyka Santiago; Dorado – Chrisangelly Franco; Manatí – Evelidys Ongay; Rincón – Ashley Michelle Ruíz; San Lorenzo – Neysa Fernández
Top 20	Bayamón – Desmarie Nieves; Humacao – Liannelys Rodríguez; Juana Díaz – Yenitzia Marie Ocasio; Las Marías – Rocío del Carmen Jorge; Orocovis – Katherine Ivonne Ortiz; Ponce – Mariela Mercedes Ramirez; Santa Isabel – Imarie Anaís Cintrón; Toa Baja – Candy Elizabeth Figueroa; Utuado – Kathleen Michelle Flores; Yabucoa – Kathryn Aydil Burgos

== Castings ==
Eight casting calls were held throughout Puerto Rico beginning on May 9, 2009 and ending on June 28, 2009. Over 60 women were selected as pre-contestants, but only 40 became the official contestants in an event on July 11, 2009 in Teatro Ambassador in San Juan. During the event five contestants were given the Special Awards of the night:

- Best Presentation/Projection: Ariana Rodriguez - Miss Carolina
- Best Catwalk: Aideliz Hidalgo - Miss Cayey
- Best Look Change: Juanita Acosta - Miss Toa Alta
- Best Mood in Competition: Kathleen Flores - Miss Utuado
- Best Self-Presentation: Coral Del Mar Casanova - Miss Hatillo

== Buscando La Mas Bella ==
Buscando La Mas Bella is an interactive reality show featuring the 40 contestants in different activities and challenges. Each week people will have the chance to vote through a text message for their favorite contestant of the week, that contestant will have the chance to automatically advance to the finals and land a spot in the Top 20. There will be 10 contestant chosen like that, the other 10 will be chosen in the Preliminatory competition by a panel of experts. The show airs Sundays on Telemundo, since August 30 and finished on October 29, two weeks before the final night of Miss Universe Puerto Rico 2010. The show is hosted by Miss Puerto Rico national director and ex-Miss Puerto Rico 1995, Desiree Lowry. A panel of judges composed of Miss Universe 2006, Zuleyka Rivera, Miss Puerto Rico 2000, Zoribel Fonalledas, fashion designer Luis Antonio and actor Albert Rodriguez evaluate the girls each week in their challenges.

Buscando La Mas Bella winners:

- 1st Week Winner: Acting Challenge: Yenitzia Ocasio - Miss Juana Diaz
- 2nd Week Winner: Physical Condition Challenge: Rocio Jorge - Miss Las Marias
- 3rd Week Winner: Outfit Presentation Challenge: Imarie Cintrón - Miss Santa Isabel
- 4th Week Winner: Commercial "Pico y Espuela" Challenge: Candy Figueroa - Miss Toa Baja
- 5th Week Winner: Celebrity Interview Challenge: Kathryn Burgos - Miss Yabucoa
- 6th Week Winner: Protocol Challenge: Kathleen Flores - Miss Utuado
- 7th Week Winner: Halloween Photoshoot Challenge: Desmarie Nieves - Miss Bayamón
- 8th Week Winner: Dance Routine Challenge: Katherine Ortiz - Miss Orocovis
- Preliminary Competition People's Choice: Chrisangelly Franco - Miss Dorado
- Primera Hora Newspaper People's Choice: Liannelys Rodriguez - Miss Humacao

== Contestants ==
39 contestants competed for the title:

Municipality	Contestant	Age	Height
Adjuntas	Sonia Noemí Cabá de Hoyos	26	1.68 m (5 ft 6 in)
Añasco	Dianne Marie Mangual Rivera	20	1.68 m (5 ft 6 in)
Arecibo	Brendaliz Sánchez Soto	22	1.75 m (5 ft 9 in)
Barceloneta	Zuleyka "Zukka" Santiago Rivera	23	1.79 m (5 ft 10 1/2 in)
Bayamón	Desmarie Nieves Candelaria	18	1.68 m (5 ft 6 in)
Caguas	Patricia Corcino Pérez	21	1.70 m (5 ft 7 in)
Camuy	Giannina Hernández Torres	21	1.68 m (5 ft 6 in)
Canóvanas	Tatiana Marie Delgado Quiñones	20	1.73 m (5 ft 8 in)
Carolina	Ariana Rodríguez Fernández	19	1.80 m (5 ft 11 in)
Cayey	Aideliz Hidalgo Betances	23	1.80 m (5 ft 11 in)
Corozal	Melany Rivera Avilés	19	1.75 m (5 ft 9 in)
Dorado	Chrisangelly Franco Collazo	20	1.71 m (5 ft 7 1/2 in)
Guayanilla	Jasmine Cardona Meléndez	19	1.73 m (5 ft 8 in)
Guaynabo	Mishelle Peña Reyes	26	1.73 m (5 ft 8 in)
Gurabo	Elizabeth Sánchez Castro	23	1.68 m (5 ft 6 in)
Hatillo	Coral Del Mar Casanova Calcerrada	23	1.75 m (5 ft 9 in)
Humacao	Liannelys Rodríguez Dávila	19	1.68 m (5 ft 6 in)
Juana Díaz	Yenitza Marie Ocasio Espada	18	1.68 m (5 ft 6 in)
Lares	Michelle Loraine Soto González	18	1.75 m (5 ft 9 in)
Las Marías	Rocio Del Carmen Jorge Rodríguez	19	1.75 m (5 ft 9 in)
Luquillo	Rose Chabel Rivera	20	1.68 m (5 ft 6 in)
Manatí	Evelidys Ongay Pérez	20	1.75 m (5 ft 9 in)
Mayagüez	Yeidy Enid Bosques Pérez	22	1.81 m (5 ft 11 1/2 in)
Orocovis	Katherine Ivonne Ortiz Meléndez	18	1.68 m (5 ft 6 in)
Ponce	Mariela Mercedes Ramirez Morales	21	1.75 m (5 ft 9 in)
Quebradillas	Carla Ivelisse Quiñones Rivera	18	1.76 m (5 ft 9 1/2 in)
Rincón	Ashley Michelle Ruiz Rodríguez	21	1.76 m (5 ft 9 1/2 in)
Río Grande	Mariana Paola Vicente Morales	20	1.73 m (5 ft 8 in)
San Germán	Andrea Teresa Jiménez Mojica	18	1.68 m (5 ft 6 in)
San Juan	Chanty Vargas Meléndez	21	1.75 m (5 ft 9 in)
San Lorenzo	Neysa Idallys Fernández Sotomayor	23	1.75 m (5 ft 9 in)
Santa Isabel	Imarie Anaís Cintrón Alvarado	22	1.68 m (5 ft 6 in)
Toa Alta	Juanita Acosta Taveras	22	1.68 m (5 ft 6 in)
Toa Baja	Candy Elizabeth Figueroa Shedrack	21	1.68 m (5 ft 6 in)
Trujillo Alto	Myosotis Enid Rivera López	26	1.73 m (5 ft 8 in)
Utuado	Kathleen Michelle Flores Centeno	17	1.70 m (5 ft 7 in)
Vega Baja	Gretchen Marie Ramos Beauchamp	20	1.73 m (5 ft 8 in)
Villalba	Hilda Marie Rivera Colón	20	1.68 m (5 ft 6 in)
Yabucoa	Kathryn Aydil Burgos	25	1.68 m (5 ft 6 in)

== Notes ==
- Miss Río Grande is a well known model in the island and won "La Cara de Imagen L'Oréal 2005".
- Miss Barceloneta is a well known supermodel in the island and represented Puerto Rico in Miss Global Beauty Queen 2008.
- Miss Mayagüez is a well known supermodel in the island. She previously competed in Miss Puerto Rico 2006 where she finished as Top 13 and in Miss Puerto Rico Teen 2005.
- Miss Cayey competed in Nuestra Belleza Latina 2008 and finished as 9th place.
- Miss Canóvanas competed for Nuestra Belleza Latina 2010 and finished as 2nd runner-up.
- Miss San Juan was semi-finalist for Nuestra Belleza Latina 2010.
- Miss Dorado competed in Miss Puerto Rico Teen 2006 where she finished as 1st runner-up.
- Miss Rincón won the Miss Puerto Rico Teenage 2006.
- Miss San Lorenzo competed in Miss Puerto Rico 2009 but didn't qualify as a finalist.
- Miss Carolina competed in the Elite Model Look 2004 where she qualified as Top 15.
- Miss Salinas competed in Miss Puerto Rico 2004 but she didn't qualify as a finalist.
- Miss Caguas competed in Nuestra Belleza Latina 2011 and finished as 6th place.

=== Disqualifications ===
- Miss Salinas, Karen Marie Lopez, left the competition on November 10, apparently for undisclosed personal reasons.

=== Crossovers ===
- Yeidy Bosques (Miss Mayagüez) was crowned Miss Earth Puerto Rico 2010 and was crowned Miss Earth Fire 2010 as 3rd runner-up.
- Aideliz Hidalgo (Miss Cayey) was crowned Miss Puerto Rico international 2010 and finished as Top 15 semi-finalist at Miss International 2010.

== Franchise Change ==
- In 2009 Magali Febles lost the franchise to send Puerto Rico's representative to the Miss Universe pageant. Miss Puerto Rico 1995, Desiree Lowry was appointed as the new owner of the franchise, making the Miss Puerto Rico 2010 pageant the first pageant under the direction of Desiree who took over the preparation of Mayra Matos for competing in Miss Universe 2009.
