= Vanessa De Roide =

Puerto Rican beauty pageant winner (born 1987)

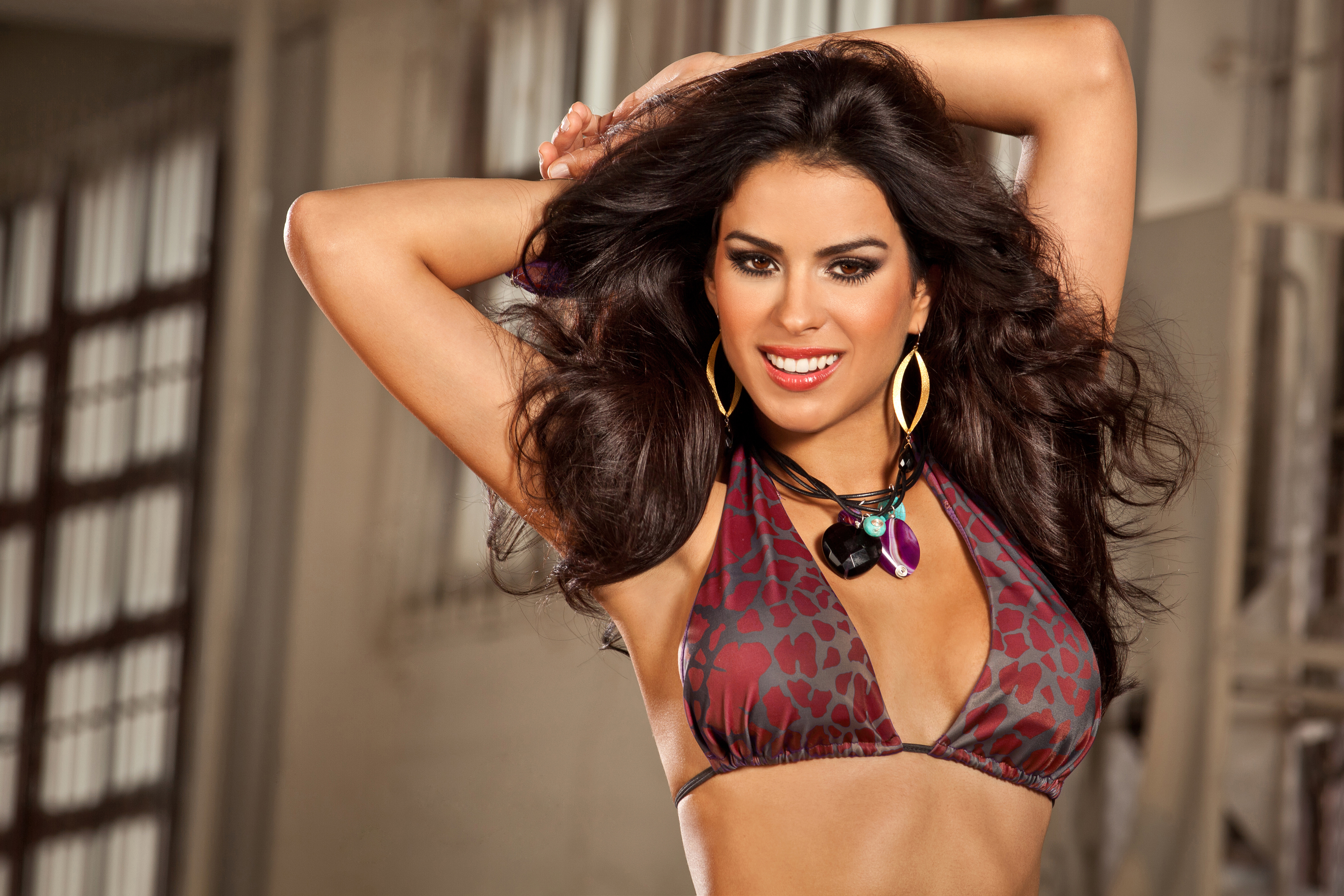
- De Roide in 2012
- Born: Vanessa De Roide Toledo; August 1, 1987 (age 39); Carolina, Puerto Rico
- Height: 1.75 m (5 ft 9 in)
- Spouse: Jorge Menendez (m. 2015)
- Children: 1
- Beauty pageant titleholder
- Title: Miss Carolina Earth 2005; Miss Earth Puerto Rico 2005; Miss Carolina Universe 2012; Nuestra Belleza Latina 2012
- Hair color: Brown
- Eye color: Brown
- Major competitions: Miss Earth Puerto Rico 2005 (Winner); Miss Earth 2005 (Top 8) (Best in Long Gown) (Miss Pond's); Miss Universe Puerto Rico 2012 (1st Runner-Up) (Best Smile); Nuestra Belleza Latina 2012 (Winner)

Vanessa Menendez (née: De Roide Toledo born August 1, 1987, in Carolina) is a Puerto Rican TV host, model and beauty pageant titleholder who was the winner of Nuestra Belleza Latina 2012. She was the female image of Fox Deportes.

== Miss Earth 2005 ==
She represented Puerto Rico in Miss Earth 2005 and finished in the Top 8. She also won the Best in Long Gown Award. As of 2021, De Roide, Yeidy Bosques, Nellys Pimentel and Krystal Badillo are currently the only 4 delegates from Puerto Rico to place in the finals, with Bosques winning the title of Miss Earth-Fire 2010 (3rd Runner-Up), Pimentel crowned Miss Earth 2019 and Badillo placed Top 8 in 2020.

== Miss Universe Puerto Rico 2012 ==
She represented Carolina at Miss Universe Puerto Rico 2012, finishing as first runner-up.

== Nuestra Belleza Latina 2012 ==
Vanessa de Roide won the title of Nuestra Belleza Latina 2012 on May 20, 2012. In addition to the title, she won a one-year contract with the Spanish speaking Univision, $250,000 in cash and prizes, and making her the second Puerto Rican woman to obtain the title, after Melissa Marty in 2008, and appeared on the cover of Cosmopolitan en Español magazine in 2012.

== Career ==
In May 2012, after winning Nuestra Belleza Latina, De Roide joined the Univision network where she made appearances on several TV shows including El Gordo y la Flaca, Sabado Gigante, Despierta America and Sal y Pimienta. She later became a backstage presenter on the third season of Mira Quien Baila. In May 2013, Univision renewed her contract and she joined Univision's longest running TV Show Sabado Gigante starring Don Francisco. She worked as a model on Sabado Gigante until the show's finale on September 19, 2015. In October 2015, De Roide joined her manager and friend Joe Ahmed to create a new talent search competition called Iconic Model Search where young aspiring models would compete for a chance to become a successful model and win several prizes.

== See also ==
- Miss Puerto Rico 2012

Awards and achievements
Preceded by (Nicaragua) Nastassja Bolívar	Nuestra Belleza Latina; 2012	Succeeded by (El Salvador) Marisela de Montecristo
Preceded by Stephanie Román (Bayamón)	Miss Universe Puerto Rico first runner-up 2012	Succeeded by Génesis Dávila (Arroyo)
Preceded by Madeline R. Arroyo	Miss Carolina Universe; 2012	Succeeded by Janyll Cintrón
Preceded by Shanira Blanco (Carolina)	Miss Earth Puerto Rico; 2005	Succeeded by Camille Collazo (Orocovis)
