= Nuestra Belleza Latina 2012 =

- Season 6
- The twelve official candidates for 2012
- Presented by: Giselle Blondet
- Judges: Osmel Sousa; Lupita Jones; Julián Gil
- Winner: Vanessa De Roide
- Runner-up: Setareh Khatibi
- No. of episodes: 12

Release
- Original network: Univision
- Original release: March 4 – May 20, 2011

Season chronology
- ← Previous; Nuestra Belleza Latina 2011 Next → Nuestra Belleza Latina 2013

Nuestra Belleza Latina 2012 is the sixth season of Nuestra Belleza Latina, and the season finale aired on Univision on May 20, 2012.

The auditions were shown Sundays, prior to the final 12 being revealed. Auditions were held from December 2011 to February 1, 2012 in six major US cities (Miami, Chicago, New York City, Fort Worth, Houston, Phoenix, Los Angeles, and Morongo) Auditions were also held in San Juan, Puerto Rico. During the audition process, 54 young women were given passes to the semi-finals in Miami. Two additional contestants were chosen from online auditions, with the help of public votes.

The winner of the contest will be awarded a contract to be one of the new faces on many of Univision's programs and award shows, along with a chance to win more than $250,000 in cash and prizes. She will also become a correspondent for one of Univision's top shows and reign as Nuestra Belleza Latina for a year. As an added bonus, the winner will appear on the cover of Cosmopolitan Magazine.

The winner of the competition was Vanessa De Roide, who represented the island of Puerto Rico.

== 2012 Judges ==
| Judges | Occupation | Judging Years |
|---|---|---|
| Osmel Sousa | President of the Miss Venezuela Organization | 2007–Present |
| Lupita Jones | Former Miss Universe 1991 and President of Nuestra Belleza México | 2008–Present |
| Julian Gil | Argentine-Born Puerto Rican-raised Actor and Model | 2008 & 2010–Present |

== Contestants ==
| Final results | Contestant |
|---|---|
| Winner | Puerto Rico – Vanessa De Roide |
| Runner-Up | Mexico – Setareh Khatibi |
| 3rd Place | Venezuela – Karol Scott |
| 4th Place | Dominican Republic – Nataliz Jimenez |
| 5th place | Mexico – Fanny Vargas |
| 6th place | Puerto Rico – Shalimar Rivera |
| 7th Place | Mexico – Ivana Rodríguez |
| 8th place | Puerto Rico – Chanty Vargas |
| 9th Place | Guatemala – Naomi Marroquin |
| 10th place | Cuba – Elizabeth Robaina |
| 11th Place | Puerto Rico – Tatiana Ares |
| 12th Place | Mexico – Ligia De Uriarte |
| Top 24 | Colombia – Patricia Cardona; Cuba – Lidislay Gonzalez; Dominican Republic – Stephanie Castellanos; El Salvador – Cindy Arevalo; Mexico / Yemen – Fabiola Al Harazi; Mexico – Karla Marquez; Peru – Ximena Castro; Puerto Rico – Essined Aponte; Puerto Rico – Angelika Rodriguez; Spain – Blanca Gómez; Venezuela – Adriana Bermudez; Venezuela – Gretchen Serrao |

=== Results ===
| Challenges Won | Contestant | Finalist |
|---|---|---|
| Gala 04 | Dominican Republic – Nataliz Jiménez; Mexico – Ligia de Uriarte; Puerto Rico – Vanessa De Roide | |
| Gala 05 | Cuba – Elizabeth Robaina; Dominican Republic – Nataliz Jiménez; Guatemala – Naomi Marroquín; Mexico – Ivanna Rodriguez; Mexico/Iran – Setareh Khatibi; Venezuela – Karol Scott | |
| Gala 06 | Dominican Republic – Nataliz Jiménez; Venezuela – Karol Scott | |
| Gala 07 | Puerto Rico – Vanessa De Roide | Venezuela – Karol Scott |
| Gala 08 | Dominican Republic – Nataliz Jiménez | Mexico – Fanny Vargas; Venezuela – Karol Scott |
| Gala 09 | Puerto Rico – Chanty Vargas | Mexico – Ivanna Rodríguez; Puerto Rico – Vanessa De Roide |
| Gala 10 | Venezuela – Karol Scott | |

| Live challenges Won | Contestant |
|---|---|
| Gala 05 | Mexico – Fanny Vargas |
| Gala 06 | Venezuela – Karol Scott; Mexico/Iran – Setareh Khatibi |
| Galas 07 | Venezuela – Karol Scott |
| Gala 08 | Puerto Rico – Chanty Vargas |
| Gala 09 | Mexico – Fanny Vargas |
| Gala 10 | Puerto Rico – Vanessa De Roide; Venezuela – Karol Scott |

== Elimination table ==
| Place | Country | Contestant | Week | | | | | | | | | | | |
| Place | Country | Contestant | 3/11 (Ep. 2) | 3/18 (Ep. 3) | 3/25 (Ep. 4) | 4/1 (Ep. 5) | 4/8 (Ep. 6) | 4/15 (Ep. 7) | 4/22 (Ep. 8) | 4/29 (Ep. 9) | 5/6 (Ep. 10) | 5/13 (Semifinal)^{3} | | 5/20 (Final) |
|---|---|---|---|---|---|---|---|---|---|---|---|---|---|---|
| 1 | (Puerto Rico) | Vanessa De Roide | GRP1 | | WIN | BTM3 | SAFE | WIN | SAFE | SAFE | SAFE | SAFE | SAFE | Winner |
| 2 | (Mexico) (Iran) | Setareh Khatibi | GRP1 | | SAFE | WIN | SAFE | BTM4 | BTM3 | BTM3 | BTM3 | SAFE | BTM2 | 1st runner-up |
| 3 | (Venezuela) | Karol Scott | GRP1 | | SAFE | BTM2 | WIN | SAFE | BTM2 | SAFE | WIN | BTM2 | SAFE | 2nd runner-up |
| 4 | (Dominican Republic) | Nataliz Jimenez | GRP1 | | WIN | WIN | WIN | BTM3 | WIN | SAFE | SAFE | SAFE | SAFE | 3rd runner-up |
| 5 | (Mexico) | Fanny Vargas | | GRP2 | SAFE | SAFE | SAFE | SAFE | BTM4 | BTM4 | BTM2 | SAFE | ELIM | |
| 6 | (Puerto Rico) | Shalimar Rivera | | GRP2 | SAFE | SAFE | BTM2 | SAFE | SAFE | BTM2 | SAFE | ELIM | | |
| 7 | (Mexico) | Ivana Rodriguez | GRP1 | | SAFE | WIN | SAFE | BTM2 | SAFE | SAFE | ELIM | | | |
| 8 | (Puerto Rico) | Chanty Vargas | GRP1 | | SAFE | SAFE | BTM4 | SAFE | BTM4 | ELIM | | | | |
| 9 | (Guatemala) | Naomi Marroquin | GRP1 | | SAFE | WIN | SAFE | SAFE | ELIM | | | | | |
| 10 | (Cuba) | Elizabeth Robaina | GRP1 | | SAFE | WIN | BTM3 | ELIM | | | | | | |
| 11 | (Puerto Rico) | Tatiana Ares | | GRP2 | SAFE | SAFE | ELIM | | | | | | | |
| 12 | (Mexico) | Ligia De Uriarte | | GRP2 | WIN | ELIM | | | | | | | | |

The contestant was part of the semi-finalists from group 1.
The contestant was part of the semi-finalists from group 2.
The contestant won the week's reward challenge.
The contestant was in the bottom three, but was saved by the other contestants.
The contestant won the week's reward challenge and was in the bottom two.
The contestant was eliminated.
The contestant was in the bottom four.
The contestant was in the bottom two.
The contestant won the week's reward challenge and was eliminated.
The contestant was a finalist, but did not win.
The contestant was the runner-up.
The contestant won Nuestra Belleza Latina 2012.

== Countries Being Represented ==
| CPW | Country | Position | | | | | | | | | |
| | | 1 | 2 | 3 | 4 | 5 | 6 | 7 | 8 SF | | 9 Finale |
|---|---|---|---|---|---|---|---|---|---|---|---|
| check | Puerto Rico | 4th | 1st | 6th | 1st | 1st | 4th | 2nd | 4th | 2nd | Winner |
| check | Mexico | 5th | 6th | 2nd | 2nd | 2nd | 1st | 4th | 2nd | 4th | 2nd |
| — | Venezuela | 6th | 5th | 1st | 4th | 4th | 2nd | 3rd | 3rd | 3rd | 3rd |
| — | Dominican Republic | 1st | 2nd | 3rd | 5th | 3rd | 3rd | 1st | 1st | 1st | 4th |
| — | Guatemala | 3rd | 3rd | 4th | 3rd | 5th | | | | | |
| check | Cuba | 2nd | 4th | 5th | 6th | | | | | | |

- Eliminated
- First Place
- Winner
- Runner-Up
- : Countries Previously won

== 2012 auditions ==
| Audition | Date |
|---|---|
| Miami | December 1, 2011 |
| San Juan, Puerto Rico | December 7, 2011 |
| Chicago | January 11, 2012 |
| New York City | January 18, 2012 |
| Fort Worth, Texas | January 22, 2012 |
| Houston | January 25, 2012 |
| Phoenix, Arizona | January 28, 2012 |
| Los Angeles | January 31, 2012 |
| Cabazon, California | February 1, 2012 |
| Online Audition | Dec. 1, 2011 – Feb. 3, 2012 |

== Online Castings ==
| Rank | Contestant | Age | Country Representing |
|---|---|---|---|
| 1 | Anais Rios | 24 | Mexico |
| 2 | Angelica Cruz | 23 | Colombia |
| 3 | Angie Morales | 23 | Peru |
| 4 | Blanca Contreras | 25 | Mexico |
| 5 | Carolina Salazar | 27 | Mexico |
| 6 | Lucia Galeano | 26 | Paraguay |
| 7 | Ruth Feliciano | 25 | Puerto Rico |
| 8 | Olivia Mendoza | 22 | Mexico |
| 9 | Tatiana Romo | 25 | Mexico |
| 10 | Vanessa Alvares | 20 | Venezuela |

Note: On March 11, it was announced who the two candidates are to travel to Miami, to compete with the rest of the candidates selected.

| Rank | Contestant | Age | Country Representing |
|---|---|---|---|
| 1 | Vanessa Alvares | 20 | Venezuela |
| 2 | Lucia Galeano | 26 | Paraguay |

== Episodes ==
=== Episode 1 ===
The 54 candidates traveling to Miami for a chance to enter the Mansion and win the crown are:

| Rank | Contestant | Years | Country Representing | Auditions |
|---|---|---|---|---|
| 1 | Ixchel Cardenas | | Mexico | California |
| 2 | Gretchen Serrao | | Venezuela | California |
| 3 | Flerida Besso | 22 | Mexico | California |
| 4 | Geisy Hernadendez | | Cuba | California |
| 5 | Karen Garrido | 22 | Mexico | California |
| 6 | Viviana Granillo | | Mexico | California |
| 7 | Setareh Khatibi | 25 | Mexico/Iran | California |
| 8 | Naomi Marroquin | 21 | Guatemala | California |
| 9 | Cindy Arevalo | | El Salvador | California |
| 10 | Thalia Lara | | Mexico | California |
| 11 | Chanty Vargas | 24 | Puerto Rico | Puerto Rico |
| 12 | Vanessa De Roide | 24 | Puerto Rico | Puerto Rico |
| 13 | Ashley Ruiz | 23 | Puerto Rico | Puerto Rico |
| 14 | Dimmary Castro | 26 | Puerto Rico | Puerto Rico |
| 15 | Ester Rivera | 21 | Puerto Rico | Puerto Rico |
| 16 | Luz Diaz | 23 | Puerto Rico | Puerto Rico |
| 17 | Juliana Rodriguez | 25 | Puerto Rico | Puerto Rico |
| 18 | Nicole Marquez | | Puerto Rico | Puerto Rico |
| 19 | Shalimar Rivera | 26 | Puerto Rico | Puerto Rico |
| 20 | Tatiana Ares | 22 | Puerto Rico | Puerto Rico |
| 21 | Yara Rivera | 20 | Puerto Rico | Puerto Rico |
| 22 | Nayeli Valles | | Mexico | Phoenix |
| 23 | Karla Marquez | 26 | Mexico | Phoenix |
| 24 | Ashley Garner | 18 | Mexico | Phoenix |
| 25 | Raquel Huerta | | Mexico | Phoenix |
| 26 | Priscila González | 23 | Colombia | New York |
| 27 | Rosalinda Silver | 27 | Dominican Republic | New York |
| 28 | Stephanie Castellanos | | Dominican Republic | New York |
| 29 | Nataliz Jiménez | 22 | Dominican Republic | New York |
| 30 | Karol Scott | 24 | Venezuela | New York |
| 31 | Laurem Payano | | Dominican Republic | New York |
| 32 | Patricia Cardona | 27 | Colombia | Miami |
| 33 | Mayela Caldera | 26 | Venezuela | Miami |
| 34 | Lisbeth Cañizales | 22 | Cuba | Miami |
| 35 | Karina Encarnación | 23 | Dominican Republic | Miami |
| 36 | Yaritza Medina | 26 | Puerto Rico | Miami |
| 37 | Ivanna Rodriguez | 20 | Mexico | Miami |
| 38 | Ximena Castro | | Peru | Miami |
| 39 | Saidee Collado | | Cuba | Miami |
| 40 | Lidislay González | | Cuba | Miami |
| 41 | Elizabeth Robaina | 23 | Cuba | Miami |
| 42 | Adrializ Gutiérrez | 19 | Cuba | Miami |
| 43 | Adriana Bermudez | | Venezuela | Texas |
| 44 | Angelika Rodriguez | | Puerto Rico | Texas |
| 45 | Fanny Vargas | 24 | Mexico | Texas |
| 46 | Ligia de Uriarte | 20 | Mexico | Texas |
| 47 | Cinthia Guerrero | 19 | Mexico | Texas |
| 48 | Sarahi Pineda | 20 | Mexico | Texas |
| 49 | Andrea Castañeda | | Mexico | Texas |
| 50 | Ambar Garcia | | Dominican Republic | Texas |
| 51 | Diana Rojas | | Colombia | Texas |
| 52 | Alma Lopez | | Mexico | Chicago |
| 53 | Yesenia Beltran | | Puerto Rico | Chicago |
| 54 | Paola Rodriguez | 21 | Puerto Rico | Chicago |
| 55 | Ciara Jiménez | | Venezuela | Chicago |
| 56 | Vanessa Alvares | | Venezuela | Casting Virtual |
| 57 | Lucia Galeano | | Paraguay | Casting Virtual |

| Color | Description |
|---|---|
| | Group 1 |
| | Group 2 |

=== Episode 2 {March 11, 2012} (Group 1, 28 participants, 12 selected) ===
- Guest Artist: Chino y Nacho

Group 1:

| Rank | Contestant | Years | Country Representing | Auditions |
|---|---|---|---|---|
| 1 | Flerida Besso | 22 | Mexico | California |
| 2 | Karen Garrido | 22 | Mexico | California |
| 3 | Setareh Khatibi | 25 | Mexico/Iran | California |
| 4 | Naomi Marroquin | 21 | Guatemala | California |
| 5 | Chanty Vargas | 24 | Puerto Rico | Puerto Rico |
| 6 | Vanessa De Roide | 24 | Puerto Rico | Puerto Rico |
| 7 | Ashley Ruiz | 23 | Puerto Rico | Puerto Rico |
| 8 | Dimmary Castro | 26 | Puerto Rico | Puerto Rico |
| 9 | Ester Rivera | 21 | Puerto Rico | Puerto Rico |
| 10 | Luz Diaz | 23 | Puerto Rico | Puerto Rico |
| 11 | Juliana Rodriguez | 25 | Puerto Rico | Puerto Rico |
| 12 | Yara Rivera | 20 | Puerto Rico | Puerto Rico |
| 13 | Karla Marquez | 26 | Mexico | Phoenix |
| 14 | Ashley Garner | 18 | Mexico | Phoenix |
| 15 | Priscilla Gonzalez | 23 | Colombia | New York |
| 16 | Rosalinda Silver | 27 | Dominican Republic | New York |
| 17 | Nataliz Jiménez | 22 | Dominican Republic | New York |
| 18 | Karol Scott | 24 | Venezuela | New York |
| 19 | Patricia Cardona | 27 | Colombia | Miami |
| 20 | Mayela Caldera | 26 | Venezuela | Miami |
| 21 | Lisbeth Cañizales | 22 | Cuba | Miami |
| 22 | Karina Encarnacion | 23 | Dominican Republic | Miami |
| 23 | Yaritza Medina | 26 | Puerto Rico | Miami |
| 24 | Ivanna Rodriguez | 20 | Mexico | Miami |
| 25 | Elizabeth Robaina | 23 | Cuba | Miami |
| 26 | Cinthia Guerrero | 19 | Mexico | Texas |
| 27 | Sarani Pineda | 20 | Mexico | Texas |
| 28 | Paola Rodriguez | 21 | Puerto Rico | Chicago |

12 Chosen:

| # | Contestant | Age | Country of origin | Audition Place |
|---|---|---|---|---|
| 1 | Vanessa De Roide | 24 | Puerto Rico | Puerto Rico |
| 2 | Nataliz Jimenez | 22 | Dominican Republic | New York |
| 3 | Karol Scott | 24 | Venezuela | New York- |
| 4 | Flerida Besso | 22 | Mexico | California |
| 5 | Chanty Vargas | 24 | Puerto Rico | Puerto Rico |
| 6 | Essined Aponte | 20 | Puerto Rico | Puerto Rico |
| 7 | Patricia Cardona | 27 | Colombia | Miami |
| 8 | Elizabeth Robaina | 23 | Cuba | Miami |
| 9 | Ivanna Rodriguez | 20 | Mexico | Miami |
| 10 | Karla Marquez | 26 | Mexico | Phoenix |
| 11 | Setareh Khatibi | 25 | Mexico/Iran | California |
| 12 | Naomi Marroquin | 21 | Guatemala | California |

- Eliminated: Karen Garrido, Ashley Garner, Priscilla González, Mayela Caldera, Lisbeth Cañizales, Karina Encarnación, Yaritza Medina, Cinthia Guerrero, Sarani Pineda, Paola Rodríguez, Dimmary Castro, Ester Rivera, Luz Díaz, Juliana Rodríguez, Yara Rivera, and Rosalinda Silver.

=== Episode 3 {March 18, 2012} (Group 2, 28 participants, 12 selected) ===
- Guest Artist: Pepe Aguilar

Group 2:

| Rank | Contestant | Country Representing | Auditions |
|---|---|---|---|
| 1 | Ixchel Cardenas | Mexico | California |
| 2 | Gretchen Serrao | Venezuela | California |
| 3 | Geisy Hernadendez | Cuba | California |
| 4 | Viviana Granillo | Mexico | California |
| 5 | Cindy Arevalo | El Salvador | California |
| 6 | Thalia Lara | Mexico | California |
| 7 | Nicole Marquez | Puerto Rico | Puerto Rico |
| 8 | Shalimar Rivera | Puerto Rico | Puerto Rico |
| 9 | Tatiana Ares | Puerto Rico | Puerto Rico |
| 10 | Nayeli Valles | Mexico | Phoenix |
| 11 | Raquel Huerta | Mexico | Phoenix |
| 12 | Stephanie Castellanos | Dominican Republic | New York |
| 13 | Laurem Payano | Dominican Republic | New York |
| 14 | Ximena Castro | Peru | Miami |
| 15 | Saidee Collado | Cuba | Miami |
| 16 | Lidislay Gonzalez | Cuba | Miami |
| 17 | Adriana Bermudez | Venezuela | Texas |
| 18 | Angelika Rodriguez | Puerto Rico | Texas |
| 19 | Fanny Vargas | Mexico | Texas |
| 20 | Ligia de Uriarte | Mexico | Texas |
| 21 | Andrea Castañeda | Mexico | Texas |
| 22 | Ambar Garcia | Dominican Republic | Texas |
| 23 | Diana Rojas | Colombia | Texas |
| 24 | Alma Lopez | Mexico | Chicago |
| 25 | Yesenia Beltran | Puerto Rico | Chicago |
| 26 | Ciara Jimenez | Venezuela | Chicago |
| 27 | Vanessa Alvares | Venezuela | Casting Virtual |
| 28 | Lucia Galeano | Paraguay | Casting Virtual |

12 Chosen:

| Rank | Contestant | Country Representing | Auditions |
|---|---|---|---|
| 1 | Gretchen Serrao | Venezuela | California |
| 2 | Cindy Arevalo | El Salvador | California |
| 3 | Shalimar Rivera | Puerto Rico | Puerto Rico |
| 4 | Tatiana Ares | Puerto Rico | Puerto Rico |
| 5 | Stephanie Castellanos | Dominican Republic | New York |
| 6 | Ximena Castro | Peru/Chile | Miami |
| 7 | Lidislay Gonzalez | Cuba | Miami |
| 8 | Adriana Bermudez | Venezuela | Texas |
| 9 | Angelika Rodriguez | Puerto Rico | Texas |
| 10 | Fanny Vargas | Mexico | Texas |
| 11 | Ligia de Uriarte | Mexico | Texas |
| 12 | Yesenia Beltran | Puerto Rico | Chicago |

Eliminated: Ixchel Cardenas, Geisy Hernadendez, Viviana Granillo, Thalia Lara, Nicole Marquez, Nayeli Valles, Raquel Huerta, Lauren Payao, Saidee Collado, Andrea Castañeda, Ambar Garcia, Diana Rojas, Alma Lopez, Ciara Jimenez, Vanessa Alvares, and Lucia Galeano.

=== Episode 4 {March 25, 2012} (Selected top 12 finalists to compete in Nuestra Belleza Latina 2012) ===
In the third show of Nuestra Belleza Latina, 24 semi-finalists opened the show dancing the theme of Rihanna "We Found Love" with silver dresses. Twelve of them were to receive the news that would enter the house of beauty to compete for a contract with Univision and $250,000. This night was a gala full of nerves and emotions. Giselle Blondet informed that the Venezuelan Gretchen Serrao left the competition due to personal problems. Last week the girls had their first challenge, quinceañera dress and reflect the sweetness of the time to go out in the May issue of Seventeen magazine, the winners were Nataliz Jimenez, Ligia de Uriarte and Vanessa de Roide. Julian assumed that among the winners two were of his team, Nataliz of Dominican Republic and Ligia of Mexico.

The time to reveal the result reached by the public for two weeks to vote for their favorites. Cindy, Ligia, Ximena and Adriana were the first who took the stage for your future in Nuestra Belleza Latina, Cindy but was saved by the votes of the public did not survive the second round.

They have not yet entered the mansion and the girls begun to have conflicts, Giselle showed us the video. Patricia Cardona criticized Karla Marquez for her dance and Essined Aponte criticized Vanessa de Roide, her compatriot. De Roide stated that it upsets her. Elizabeth said Lidislay did not do well in the recording of this talent.

The first bed in the mansion was to Nataliz Jimenez and the second for the Cuban Elizabeth Robaina, the girls met Julian Group 47 percent of the votes from the public. Will Cuba take another crown? Greydis Gil of Cuba obtained the crown in 2009. Nataliz showed his talent of heroin and Elizabeth imitated Osmel Sousa.

Osmel Girls took the stage, the first runner up was Naomi Marroquin of Guatemala, who confessed she did not think being elected by her Spanish. She showed her talent in martial arts. The second chosen by the audience was Shalimar Rivera of Puerto Rico, she sang a song of India.

Lupita Jones' group, Fanny Vargas was the first choice and of course she could not hold back her tears. Osmel did not make the way easy for her, but Lupita supported and is confident that will fight for the crown. Ivanna Rodriguez was the second choice, she showed her talent for acting.

The singer Pablo Montero arrived with his mariachi to sing "Serenata Huasteca" and the girls go crazy. The Mexican pleased a fan with a kiss and Giselle had the pleasure of pinching.

The girls were taught Marcelo Crudele boxing, boxing coach Dale heartily.

Julian elected two more girls Ligia de Uriarte of Mexico, who auditioned in Houston, and Chanty Vargas of Puerto Rico. Lupita elected the Puerto Ricans Vanessa de Roide and Tatiana Ares.

Osmel Sousa explained that the competition was seeking a queen that embodied diversity, elegance, and class. His choice was Venezuelan contestant Karol Scott, who showcased her talent for dancing samba. The final room in the mansion was for the Mexican-Iranian contestant Setareh Khatibi.

- Guest Artist: Pablo Montero
- Challenge of the week: Posing as a 15-year-old teenager. The top 3 winners are...

| Award | Contestant |
|---|---|
| Won the challenge of the week | Puerto Rico – Vanessa De Roide; Dominican Republic – Nataliz Jiménez; Mexico – Ligia de Uriarte |

| # | Contestant | Country of origin | Audition Place |
|---|---|---|---|
| 1 | Patricia Cardona | Colombia | Miami |
| 2 | Elizabeth Robaina | Cuba | Miami |
| 3 | Lidislay Gonzalez | Cuba | Miami |
| 4 | Nataliz Jiménez | Dominican Republic | New York |
| 5 | Stephanie Castellanos | Dominican Republic | New York |
| 6 | Cindy Arevalo | El Salvador | California |
| 7 | Naomi Marroquín | Guatemala | California |
| 8 | Flerida Besso | Mexico | California |
| 9 | Ivanna Rodríguez | Mexico | Miami |
| 10 | Karla Marquez | Mexico | Phoenix |
| 11 | Setareh Khatibi | Mexico/Iran | California |
| 12 | Essined Aponte | Puerto Rico | Puerto Rico |
| 13 | Fanny Vargas | Mexico | Texas |
| 14 | Ligia de Uriarte | Mexico | Texas |
| 15 | Ximena Castro | Peru/Chile | Miami |
| 16 | Tatiana Ares | Puerto Rico | Puerto Rico |
| 17 | Vanessa De Roide | Puerto Rico | Puerto Rico |
| 18 | Shalimar Rivera | Puerto Rico | Puerto Rico |
| 19 | Chanty Vargas | Puerto Rico | Puerto Rico |
| 20 | Angelika Rodriguez | Puerto Rico | Texas |
| 21 | Yesenia Beltran | Puerto Rico | Chicago |
| 22 | Adriana Bermudez | Venezuela | Texas |
| 23 | Gretchen Serrao | Venezuela | California |
| 24 | Karol Scott | Venezuela | New York |

12 Chosen:

| Rank | Contestant | Country Representing | Auditions |
|---|---|---|---|
| 1 | Nataliz Jiménez | Dominican Republic | New York |
| 2 | Elizabeth Robaina | Cuba | Miami |
| 3 | Naomi Marroquín | Guatemala | California |
| 4 | Shalimar Rivera | Puerto Rico | Puerto Rico |
| 5 | Fanny Vargas | Mexico | Texas |
| 6 | Ivanna Rodríguez | Mexico | Miami |
| 7 | Chanty Vargas | Puerto Rico | Puerto Rico |
| 8 | Ligia de Uriarte | Mexico | Texas |
| 9 | Vanessa De Roide | Puerto Rico | Puerto Rico |
| 10 | Tatiana Ares | Puerto Rico | Puerto Rico |
| 11 | Karol Scott | Venezuela | New York |
| 12 | Setareh Khatibi | Mexico/Iran | California |

- Eliminated: Patricia Cardona, Lidslay Gonzalez, Stephanie Castellanos, Cindy Arevalo, Flerida Besso, Karla Marqez, Essined Aponte, Ximena Castro, Angelika Rodriguez, Yesenia Beltran, Adriana Bermudez, and Gretchen Serrao.

=== Episode 5 {April 1, 2012} (Eliminations, Twelve candidates, only Eleven Remain) ===
- Guest Artist: Juan Magan
- Challenge of the week: the challenge of the week is divided into two groups and the strong winner roup...

| Award | Contestant |
|---|---|
| Won the challenge of the week: Agility and Speed | Venezuela – Karol Scott; Dominican Republic – Nataliz Jiménez; Cuba – Elizabeth Robaina; Guatemala – Naomi Marroquín; Mexico/Iran – Setareh Khatibi; Mexico – Ivanna Rodríguez |
| The winner of the live challenge: The Gateway of Tibet | Mexico – Fanny Vargas |

| Rank | Contestant | Country Representing | Punctuation of Live challenge |
|---|---|---|---|
| 1 | Nataliz Jiménez | Dominican Republic | 21 Points |
| 2 | Elizabeth Robaina | Cuba | 17 Points |
| 3 | Naomi Marroquín | Guatemala | 12 Points |
| 4 | Shalimar Rivera | Puerto Rico | 20 Points |
| 5 | Fanny Vargas | Mexico | 27 Points |
| 6 | Ivanna Rodríguez | Mexico | 22 Points |
| 7 | Chanty Vargas | Puerto Rico | 19 Points |
| 8 | Ligia de Uriarte | Mexico | 18 Points |
| 9 | Vanessa De Roide | Puerto Rico | 07 Points |
| 10 | Tatiana Ares | Puerto Rico | 23 Points |
| 11 | Karol Scott | Venezuela | 18 Points |
| 12 | Setareh Khatibi | Mexico/Iran | 20 Points |

- Live challenge: the gateway of Tibet: consisted of the candidates modeling and walking on a runway showing beauty and poise. The best in this challenge was Fanny Vargas the three candidates who did worse in this competition was Vanessa de Roide, Naomi Marroquín, and Elizabeth Robaina.
- all three were threatened ...

| Rank | Contestant | Country Representing | state by the public | status of the girls | state by the jury |
|---|---|---|---|---|---|
| #1 | Ligia de Uriarte | Mexico | threatened | — | removed |
| #2 | Vanessa de Roide | Puerto Rico | safe | safe | — |
| #3 | Karol Scott | Venezuela | safe | threatened | safe |

- Elimination: Host Giselle Blondet revealed the name of the three girls who were threatened and they were: Ligia de Uriarte from Mexico, Vanessa de Roide of Puerto Rico and Venezuelan Karol Scott.... Giselle then revealed that Ligia de Uriarte of Mexico had the lowest number of votes from the public. Vanessa de Roide of Puerto Rico and Venezuelan Karol Scott received votes from the other girls in the competition to see who would go up to see the judges. They decided to threaten Karol Scott, Karol and Ligia went to the judges and the judges decided to save Karol. Ligia was eliminated from the competition getting 12th place.
- Eliminated: Mexico - Ligia de Uriarte

=== Episode 6 {April 8, 2012} (Eliminations: eleven candidates only ten remain in the mansion of beauty) ===
- Guest Artist: Prince Royce
- Challenge of the week: The challenge was that the candidate with the highest physical strength and Agility in soccer would win $10,000 and the winner was: ...

| Award | Contestant |
|---|---|
| Won the challenge of the week: soccer competition | Venezuela – Karol Scott |
| The winner of the live challenge: Flying Beauties | Venezuela – Karol Scott; Mexico/Iran – Setareh Khatibi |

| Rank | Contestant | Country Representing | Gender | Punctuation of Live challenge |
|---|---|---|---|---|
| 1 | Nataliz Jiménez | Dominican Republic | Tango | 21 Points |
| 2 | Elizabeth Robaina | Cuba | Rock | 16 Points |
| 3 | Naomi Marroquín | Guatemala | Geisha & Ninja | 17 Points |
| 4 | Shalimar Rivera | Puerto Rico | Caribbean Music | 14 Points |
| 5 | Fanny Vargas | Mexico | Black Swan | 24 Points |
| 6 | Ivanna Rodríguez | Mexico | Witch | 17 Points |
| 7 | Chanty Vargas | Puerto Rico | Catwoman | 20 Points |
| 8 | Vanessa de Roide | Puerto Rico | Bell | 21 Points |
| 9 | Tatiana Ares | Puerto Rico | Cabernicola | 13 Points |
| 10 | Karol Scott | Venezuela | Arabic Music | 25 Points |
| 11 | Setareh Khatibi | Mexico/Iran | Clown | 25 Points |

- Live challenge:Flying beauties: the challenge is that the candidates should this tied to a cable that fly in the air formaque realizadon different activities in the air of different musical genres.
- all three were threatened ...

| Rank | Contestant | Country Representy | state by the public | status of the girls | state by the jury |
|---|---|---|---|---|---|
| #1 | Tatiana Ares | Puerto Rico | threatened | — | Removed |
| #2 | Elizabeth Robaina | Cuba | safe | safe | — |
| #3 | Shalimar Rivera | Puerto Rico | safe | threatened | safe |

- Elimination: Giselle Blondet reported early on which girls were the three threatened with the lowest percentage of votes from the public and they were: Chanty Vargas, Tatiana Ares, and Elizabeth Robaina. To avoid elimination these three girls had to receive high scores in the live challenge. Finally the three girls with the lowest scores between the live challenge and the votes of the audience were: Shalimar Rivera, Tatiana Ares, and Elizabeth Robaina. Later Tatiana received the news that she had the lowest audience votes and was threatened. Shalimar and Elizabeth received votes from the other girls and they saved Elizabeth. Tatiana Ares and Shalimar Rivera both from Puerto Rico faced the judges and since there was a tie, the decision to save one of them was in the hands of Julian Gil. In the end Julian saved Shalimar. Tatiana Ares was eliminated and received 11th place.
- Eliminated: Puerto Rico – Tatiana ares

=== Episode 7 {April 15, 2012} (Eliminations, only ten of eleven candidates in the competition continue our latin beauty) ===
- Guest Artist: Gloria Trevi
- Challenge of the week:

| Award | Contestant |
|---|---|
| Won the challenge of the week: People en Español | Puerto Rico – Vanessa De Roide |
| The winner of the live challenge: Mermaids | Venezuela – Karol Scott |

| Rank | Contestant | Country Representing | Punctuation of Live challenge |
|---|---|---|---|
| 1 | Nataliz Jiménez | Dominican Republic | 08 Points |
| 2 | Elizabeth Robaina | Cuba | 14 Points |
| 3 | Naomi Marroquín | Guatemala | 11 Points |
| 4 | Shalimar Rivera | Puerto Rico | 19 Points |
| 5 | Fanny Vargas | Mexico | 20 Points |
| 6 | Ivanna Rodríguez | Mexico | 13 Points |
| 7 | Chanty Vargas | Puerto Rico | 17 Points |
| 8 | Vanessa De Roide | Puerto Rico | 21 Points |
| 09 | Karol Scott | Venezuela | 28 Points |
| 10 | Setareh Khatibi | Mexico | 23 Points |

- Live challenge:
- all three were threatened ...

| Rank | Contestant | Country Representy | state by the public | status of the girls | state by the jury |
|---|---|---|---|---|---|
| #1 | Elizabeth Robaina | Cuba | threatened | — | removed |
| #2 | Ivanna Rodriguez | Mexico | safe | threatened | safe |
| #3 | Nataliz Jimenez | Dominican Republic | safe | safe | — |

- Eliminated: Cuba – Elizabeth Robaina

=== Episode 8 {April 22, 2012} (Eliminations: eight of nine candidates in the competition continue our latin beauty) ===
- Challenge of the week:

| Award | Contestant |
|---|---|
| Won the challenge of the week: Carrera NASCAR | Dominican Republic – Nataliz Jimenez |
| The winner of the live challenge: Reporters in Danger | Puerto Rico – Chanty Vargas |

| Rank | Contestant | Country Representing | Punctuation of Live challenge |
|---|---|---|---|
| 1 | Nataliz Jiménez | Dominican Republic | 23 points |
| 2 | Naomi Marroquín | Guatemala | 04 points |
| 3 | Shalimar Rivera | Puerto Rico | 16 points |
| 4 | Fanny Vargas | Mexico | 16 points |
| 5 | Ivanna Rodríguez | Mexico | 15 points |
| 6 | Chanty Vargas | Puerto Rico | 25 points |
| 7 | Vanessa De Roide | Puerto Rico | 19 points |
| 8 | Karol Scott | Venezuela | 12 points |
| 9 | Setareh Khatibi | Mexico | 06 points |

- Live challenge:
- all three were threatened ...

| Rank | Contestant | Country Representy | state by the public | status of the girls | state by the jury |
|---|---|---|---|---|---|
| #1 | Karol Scott | Venezuela | threatened | — | safe |
| #2 | Naomi Marroquín | Guatemala | safe | threatened | removed |
| #3 | Setareh Khatibi | Mexico/Iran | safe | safe | — |

- Eliminated: Guatemala – Naomi Marroquín

=== Episode 9 {April 29, 2012} (Eliminations: eight candidates, only seven in the competition continue our latin beauty) ===
- Guest Artist:
- Challenge of the week:

| Award | Contestant |
|---|---|
| Won the challenge of the week: Maybeline New York | Puerto Rico – Chanty Vargas |
| The winner of the live challenge: Beauties in Novelas | Mexico – Fanny Vargas |

| Rank | Contestant | Country Representing | Punctuation of Live challenge |
|---|---|---|---|
| 1 | Nataliz Jiménez | Dominican Republic | 25 points |
| 2 | Shalimar Rivera | Puerto Rico | 16 points |
| 3 | Fanny Vargas | Mexico | 30 points |
| 4 | Ivanna Rodríguez | Mexico | 15 points |
| 5 | Chanty Vargas | Puerto Rico | 19 points |
| 6 | Vanessa de Roide | Puerto Rico | 23 points |
| 7 | Karol Scott | Venezuela | 09 points |
| 8 | Setareh Khatibi | Mexico | 12 points |

- Live challenge:
- all three were threatened ...

| Rank | Contestant | Country Representy | state by the public | status of the girls | state by the jury |
|---|---|---|---|---|---|
| #1 | Chanty Vargas | Puerto Rico | threatened | — | removed |
| #2 | Shalimar Rivera | Puerto Rico | safe | threatened | safe |
| #3 | Setareh Khatibi | Mexico/Iran | Safe | Safe | — |

- Eliminated: Puerto Rico - Chanty Vargas

=== Episode 10 {May 06, 2012} (Eliminations: seven candidates remain only six in the competition continue our latin beauty) ===
- Guest Artist:
- Challenge of the week:

| Award | Contestant |
|---|---|
| Won the challenge of the week: Colgate | Venezuela – Karol Scott |
| The winner of the live challenge: Beauties in the Dark | Venezuela – Karol Scott; Puerto Rico – Venessa De Roide |

| Rank | Contestant | Country Representing | Punctuation of Live challenge |
|---|---|---|---|
| 1 | Nataliz Jiménez | Dominican Republic | 22 points |
| 2 | Shalimar Rivera | Puerto Rico | 24 points |
| 3 | Fanny Vargas | Mexico | 19 points |
| 4 | Ivanna Rodríguez | Mexico | 16 points |
| 5 | Vanessa De Roide | Puerto Rico | 27 points |
| 6 | Karol Scott | Venezuela | 27 points |
| 7 | Setareh Khatibi | Mexico/Iran | 25 points |

- Live challenge:
- all three were threatened ...

| Rank | Contestant | Country Representy | state by the public | status of the girls | state by the jury |
|---|---|---|---|---|---|
| #1 | Fanny Vargas | Mexico | threatened | — | safe |
| #2 | Ivanna Rodriguez | Mexico | safe | threatened | removed |
| #3 | Setareh Kathibi | Mexico | safe | safe | — |

- Eliminated: Mexico – Ivanna Rodriguez

=== Episode 11 {May 13, 2012} (Eliminations: Semifinal ) ===
| Award | Contestant |
|---|---|
| Won the challenge of the week: | Puerto Rico – Shalimar Rivera |

| Rank | Contestant | Country Representing | State |
|---|---|---|---|
| 1 | Nataliz Jiménez | Dominican Republic | Safe |
| 2 | Shalimar Rivera | Puerto Rico | Eliminated |
| 3 | Fanny Vargas | Mexico | Eliminated |
| 4 | Vanessa De Roide | Puerto Rico | safe |
| 5 | Karol Scott | Venezuela | Safe |
| 6 | Setareh Khatibi | Mexico | Safe |

both are threatened by the public .....

| Rank | Contestant | Country Representy | State |
|---|---|---|---|
| #1 | Shalimar Rivera | Puerto Rico | Removed |
| #2 | Karol Scott | Venezuela | Safe |

both are threatened by the jury .....

| Rank | Contestant | Country Represented | State |
|---|---|---|---|
| #1 | Setareh Khatibi | Mexico | Safe |
| #2 | Fanny Vargas | Mexico | Removed |

- Eliminated:
- Puerto Rico – Shalimar Rivera
- Mexico – Fanny Vargas

=== Episode 12 {May 20, 2012} (The Finale: Nuestra Belleza Latina 2012 is crowned) ===
- Guest Artists: Juanes and David Bisbal
- Guest Actor: Gabriel Soto

| Rank | Contestant | Country Represented | Final results |
|---|---|---|---|
| 1 | Vanessa de Roide | Puerto Rico | Winner |
| 2 | Setareh Khatibi | Mexico | 2nd place |
| 3 | Karol Scott | Venezuela | 3rd place |
| 4 | Nataliz Jiménez | Dominican Republic | 4th place |

- Eliminated:
- Dominican Republic – Nataliz Jiménez
- Venezuela – Karol Scott
- Mexico – Setareh Kahtibi

== Final Catwalk Order ==
Voting Phone Numbers and Final Catwalk Order
| Order | Episodes | | | | | | | | | | |
| Order | Top 24 | Final 12 | 1 | 2 | 3 | 4 | 5 | 6 | 7 (Semi-Final) | | 8 (Finale) |
|---|---|---|---|---|---|---|---|---|---|---|---|
| 1 | Vanessa | Nataliz | Tatiana | Karol | Shalimar | Shalimar | Vanessa | Setareh | Nataliz | Nataliz | Vanessa |
| 2 | Nataliz | Elizabeth | Setareh | Ivanna | Fanny | Fanny | Fanny | Nataliz | Fanny | Vanessa | Setareh |
| 3 | Karol | Naomi | Nataliz | Chanty | Vanessa | Nataliz | Karol | Shalimar | Setareh | Karol | Karol |
| 4 | Flerida | Shalimar | Fanny | Setareh | Naomi | Setareh | Ivanna | Fanny | Vanessa | Setareh | Nataliz |
| 5 | Chanty | Fanny | Chanty | Vanessa | Karol | Chanty | Nataliz | Vanessa | Karol | Fanny | |
| 6 | Patricia | Ivanna | Naomi | Fanny | Chanty | Ivanna | Setareh | Karol | Shalimar | | |
| 7 | Essined | Chanty | Elizabeth | Nataliz | Setareh | Vanessa | Shalimar | Ivanna | | | |
| 8 | Elizabeth | Ligia | Vanessa | Naomi | Nataliz | Karol | Chanty | | | | |
| 9 | Naomi | Vanessa | Ivanna | Elizabeth | Ivanna | Naomi | | | | | |
| 10 | Ivanna | Tatiana | Shalimar | Shalimar | Elizabeth | | | | | | |
| 11 | Karla | Karol | Karol | Tatiana | | | | | | | |
| 12 | Setareh | Setareh | Ligia | | | | | | | | |
| 13 | Tatiana | Yesenia | | | | | | | | | |
| 14 | Lidislay | Lidislay | | | | | | | | | |
| 15 | Ligia | Patricia | | | | | | | | | |
| 16 | Adriana | Cyndy | | | | | | | | | |
| 17 | Shalimar | Flerida | | | | | | | | | |
| 18 | Ximena | Stephanie | | | | | | | | | |
| 19 | Cyndy | Essined | | | | | | | | | |
| 20 | Yesenia | Angelika | | | | | | | | | |
| 21 | Gretchen | Karla | | | | | | | | | |
| 22 | Stephanie | Ximena | | | | | | | | | |
| 23 | Angelika | Adriana | | | | | | | | | |
| 24 | Fanny | Gretchen | | | | | | | | | |

| Color | Description | Used |
|---|---|---|
| | The contestant won the competition | Top 2 |
| | The contestant became runner-up | Top 2 |
| | The contestant was saved by the public vote | Week 7 |
| | The contestant was saved by the judges | Week 1-Week 7 |
| | The contestant was saved by fellow contestants | Week 1-Week 6 |
| | The contestant was in the bottom 4 | Week 2-Week 5 |
| | The contestant was eliminated | Week 1 |
| | The contestant quit the competition | Final 12 |
| | The contestant was in the Top 12 of Group 1 | Top 24 |
| | The contestant was in the Top 12 of Group 2 | Top 24 |

== Order of elimination ==
| Rank | Contestant | Country Represented | Results | | | | | | | | |
| Rank | Contestant | Country Represented | Gala 01 | Gala 02 | Gala 03 | Gala 04 | Gala 05 | Gala 06 | Gala 07 | | Gala 08 |
|---|---|---|---|---|---|---|---|---|---|---|---|
| 1 | Vanessa | Puerto Rico | 08 points^{2} | 21 points | 21 points | 19 points | 23 points | 27 points | Safe | 2nd | Winner |
| 2 | Setareh | (Mexico) México | 20 points | 25 points | 23 points^{1} | 06 points^{2} | 12 points^{2} | 25 points | Safe | Risk | 1st Runner-up |
| 3 | Karol | Venezuela | 18 points | 25 points | 28 points | 12 points | 09 points | 27 points | Risk | 3rd | 2nd Runner-up |
| 4 | Nataliz | Dominican Republic | 21 points | 21 points | 08 points^{2} | 23 points | 25 points | 22 points | Safe | 1st | 3rd Runner-up |
| 5 | Fanny | (Mexico) México | 27 points | 24 points | 20 points | 16 points^{1} | 30 points^{1} | 19 points | Safe | 5th place^{3} | |
| 6 | Shalimar | Puerto Rico | 20 points | 14 points^{2} | 19 points | 16 points | 16 points | 24 points | 6th place^{3} | | |
| 7 | Ivanna | (Mexico) México | 22 points | 17 points | 13 points | 15 points | 15 points | 16 points | | | |
| 8 | Chanty | Puerto Rico | 19 points | 20 points^{1} | 17 points | 25 points^{1} | 19 points | | | | |
| 9 | Naomi | Guatemala | 12 points | 17 points | 11 points | 04 points^{2} | | | | | |
| 10 | Elizabeth | Cuba | 17 points | 16 points | 14 points | | | | | | |
| 11 | Tatiana | Puerto Rico | 23 points | 13 points | | | | | | | |
| 12 | Ligia | (Mexico) México | 18 points | | | | | | | | |

=== Notes ===
^{1} – This contestant was initially going to be in danger of elimination, but the results of the live challenge saved her from elimination.
^{2} – This contestant was initially safe from elimination, but the results of the live challenge caused her to be in danger of elimination.
^{3} – During gala 07, there was no live challenge, and only the two girls in danger faced the risk of elimination. The rest of the contestants were put through simultaneously during the first elimination, and individually during the second elimination.

- Each judge may give the contestant a score that ranges from 1-10. There are three judges, meaning that the greatest possible score is 30 points.
- Elimination and weekly ranks are determined by the public vote. The three contestants with the fewest votes from the public each week, are within danger of elimination. Contestants may escape the danger zone if they receive a high score from the judges for their performance at the live challenge, and if their added scores are high enough. In contrast, contestants that were initially safe, may have to face the risk of elimination if they receive a low score from the judges, and fall below the line of safety.

=== Groups ===
| Color | Description |
|---|---|
| | This contestant belongs to Lupita's group. |
| | This contestant belongs to Julian's group. |
| | This contestant belongs to Osmel's group. |

=== Results ===
| Color | Description |
|---|---|
| | The contestant did not lose or win the challenge. |
| | This contestant won the challenge of the week. |
| | This contestant won the live challenge during judging. |
| | This contestant was in danger of elimination, but was saved by her fellow contestants. |
| | This contestant was in danger of elimination, but she was saved by the judges. |
| | This contestant was in danger of elimination, but she was saved by the public vote. |
| | This contestant was in danger of elimination and was eliminated from the competition because she was not saved by her judges, or by her fellow contestants. |
| | This contestant won both the live challenge, and challenge of the week. |
| | This contestant won the challenge of the week and was in danger of elimination, but was eliminated from the competition because she was not saved by her judges, or by her fellow contestants. |
| | This contestant won the competition |

== Contestant Notes ==
- PUR Vanessa De Roide represented Carolina at Miss Puerto Rico 2012, and finished as 1st Runner-Up. She also represented Puerto Rico in Miss Earth 2005 and finished in the Top 8.
- PUR Chanty Vargas represented Puerto Rico at Miss Intercontinental 2011. She had also made it to the top 20 in Nuestra Belleza Latina 2010
- MEX Setareh Khatibi represented Newhall at Miss California USA 2012 and won the Best Swimsuit Award. She would later compete in Nuestra Belleza Latina 2016 where she once again placed 1st Runner-Up.
- MEX Fanny Vargas had a supporting role as Marissa in the 2012 film, Sweetwater.
- MEX Ivanna Rodríguez competed in Nuestra Belleza Nuevo León 2010 where she finished as 1st Runner-up.
- CUB Elizabeth Robaina won Miss Latina US 2010 and later represented USA at the Miss Latin America 2010 where she finished as 4th runner up. She also represented Cuba at Miss International 2011.

== Winners ==
| Preceded by Nastassja Bolivar | Nuestra Belleza Latina 2012; Vanessa De Roide | Succeeded by Marisela Demontecristo |
