= Coral Del Mar Casanova =

Puerto Rican model

- Born: Coral Del Mar Casanova Calcerrada; April 13, 1986 (age 40); Puerto Rico
- Height: 5 ft 9 in (1.75 m)
- Beauty pageant titleholder
- Title: Miss Hatillo 2010
- Hair color: Brown
- Eye color: Green
- Major competition: Miss Universe Puerto Rico 2010 (4th Runner-up)

Coral del Mar Casanova is a Puerto Rican beauty pageant titleholder.

== Career ==
=== Miss Universe Puerto Rico 2010 ===
On November 12, 2009, Coral competed at the Miss Universe Puerto Rico 2010 pageant representing the city of Hatillo where she placed as one of the final five finalists in which she resulted as the 4th Runner-up. On April 22, 2010, Coral competed for the title of Miss Puerto Rico Earth, she was one of the Top Ten finalists.

== See also ==
- Miss Puerto Rico 2010
