= Ariana Rodriguez =

Puerto Rican model

- Born: Ariana Rodríquez Fernández; October 21, 1990 (age 35); Carolina, Puerto Rico
- Height: 1.80 m (5 ft 11 in)
- Beauty pageant titleholder
- Title: Miss Carolina Universe 2010
- Hair color: Black
- Eye color: Brown
- Major competitions: Miss Universe Puerto Rico 2010 (1st Runner-Up)

Ariana Rodríguez (born October 21, 1990, in Carolina, Puerto Rico) is a Puerto Rican model and beauty pageant titleholder who represented Carolina at the Miss Puerto Rico 2010 that was held on November 12, 2009, in San Juan. Rodriguez is majoring in finance, and placed 1st Runner-Up at Miss Universe Puerto Rico 2010.

== See also ==
- Miss Puerto Rico 2010

Awards and achievements
Preceded by Jennifer Colón (San Juan)	Miss Universe Puerto Rico 1st Runner-Up; 2010	Succeeded by Stephanie Román (Bayamón)
Preceded by Gloria Almonte	Miss Carolina Universe; 2010	Succeeded by Madeline R. Arroyo
