= Mu Alpha Phi =

First Puerto Rican sorority

- ΜΑΦ
- Founded: October 24, 1927; 99 years ago University of Puerto Rico
- Type: Social
- Affiliation: CIPR
- Status: Active
- Scope: National
- Chapters: 4 collegiate, 7 alumni
- Nickname: la Mu
- Headquarters: San Juan, Puerto Rico; United States
- Website: www.sororidadmualphaphi.com

Mu Alpha Phi (ΜΑΦ) is a sorority established in Puerto Rico on October 24, 1927. It is considered to be the first Puerto Rican sorority founded in the island. The sorority has alumnae and university chapters across the island and an alumni chapter in Orlando, Florida.

== History ==
The sorority that pioneered the Greek world movement for women on the island was established in the University of Puerto Rico, Río Piedras campus in October 1927. The founding sisters were Carmen Rosa Janer, Laura Muñoz, Emma Colón, Aida González, María Padial, Carmen Belén Cruz, Alicia Rivero, Luz Vilá, María Luisa Márquez, Luz Vilariño, Georgina Pastor, Mercedes Fernández, Ramona Santana, Ligia Noya, María Antonieta Delgado, Laura Cesteros, Blanca Martorell, Dolores Gutiérrez de Arroyo, Encarnación Rodríguez, Celia Machese, Sofía Oronoz, Josefina Gutiérrez, Sara Irizarry, María Inés Dávila and Ana María Santana. Since many sisters were graduating by 1930 the need for an alumni chapter was evident, thus the Capitulo Pasivo was founded; this chapter is now called Zona Alpha Alumnae.

By September 13, 1946, the Beta chapter was established at the College of Agriculture and Mechanic Arts in Mayagüez, Puerto Rico. The first Beta sisters were Delia González, Maita Bravo, Andreita Martínez, and Rochie Sabater. As a result of the Beta chapter, the Río Piedras university chapter came to be called Alpha chapter.

In June 1950, sorority sisters at Universidad Católica de Santa María, later called Pontificia Universidad Catolica de Puerto Rico, organized the Gamma chapter, its first president was Betty Zapater de McConnie. The chapter was officially recognized by University Authorities by November 1955. By the early 1960s, sisters at the Inter American University at San Germán organized the Delta chapter, it was led by Martita Mercado, Sally Zaragoza, Laira González Rigau and Berníe Pabón.

Two years later, Mu sisters led by Leila Padilla de Balaguer and Katherine Morell de Domínguez at Arecibo requested a charter for the Epsilon chapter This chapter closed and was later re-opened in 1985. Since so many chapters were being created by 1950 a central governing body was created called Honorable Consejo Supremo.. Its first president was Judith Mercader de Sifre.

Two alumni chapters, Chi Alumni in Cabo Rojo and Gamma Alumnae in Ponce, were established; both chapters were closed. Nevertheless, alumni chapters or "zonas" were then established for sisters who had graduated, were married, or had other interests than those of the student sisters. The first Zona was established in Ponce in 1979 and called Zona Ponce. In San Juan. the alumni chapter was reopened as Zona Alpha Alumnae. By 1985, the Zona Beta was founded in Mayagüez. In1989, Zona Epsilon was founded in Arecibo. In 1992, Zona Phi Alpha was founded in San Juan, and in 1993, Zona Delta.formed in San Germán. Zona Orlando was founded in October 2016, with approximately 70 members living in Florida.

== Chapters ==
=== Collegiate chapters ===
Following is a list of the collegiate chapters of Mu Alpha Phi. Active chapters are indicated in bold. Inactive chapters are in italics.

Chapter	Charter date and range	Institution	Location	Status	Ref.
**Alpha**	October 24, 1927	University of Puerto Rico, Río Piedras Campus	San Juan, Puerto Rico	Active	
**Beta**	September 13, 1946	University of Puerto Rico at Mayagüez	Mayagüez, Puerto Rico	Active	(Note: Chapter formed at the College of Agriculture and Mechanical Arts of Mayagüe, now the University of Puerto Rico at Mayagüez.)
**Gamma**	September 15, 1950	Pontifical Catholic University of Puerto Rico	Ponce, Puerto Rico	Active	(Note: Chapter was formed at the Catholic University in Ponce, which later became Pontifical Catholic University of Puerto Rico.)
**Delta**	June 27, 1959 – c. 1965; 1986	Interamerican University of Puerto Rico	San Germán, Puerto Rico	Active	
**Epsilon**	1963–c. 1973-1975; September 1985 – 2004; 2010	University of Puerto Rico at Arecibo	Arecibo, Puerto Rico	Active	

=== Alumnae zones ===
Following is a list of the alumnae zones or chapters of Mu Alpha Phi. Active chapters are indicated in bold. Inactive chapters are in italics.

Chapter	Charter date and range	Location	Status	Ref.
Alpha Alumnae Passive chapter	1930–19xx ?	San Juan, Puerto Rico	Active	
Gamma Alumnae	1965–1966	Ponce, Puerto Rico	Inactive	
Chi Alumnae	1965	Cabo Rojo, Puerto Rico	Inactive	
**Zona Delta**	May 1979–198x ?; 1995	San Germán, Puerto Rico	Active	
**Zona Ponce**	November 18, 1979	Ponce, Puerto Rico	Active	
**Zona Alpha Alumnae**	1984	San Juan, Puerto Rico	Active	(Note: Chapter formed as Alpha Alumnae Passive chapter but later changed its name.)
**Zona Beta**	February 23, 1985	Mayagüez, Puerto Rico	Active	
**Zona Epsilon**	March 19, 1989	Arecibo, Puerto Rico	Active	
**Zona Phi Alpha**	1992	San Juan, Puerto Rico	Active	
**Zona Orlando**	October 2016	Florida, United States	Active	

== Notable members ==
Name	Chapter	Notability	Ref.
Delis Castillo		Former mayor of Ponce	
María del Carmen González		Journalist	
Mercedes Marrero de Bauermeister		Former Director of Administración de Tribunales de Puerto Rico	
Janina		Singer and actress	
Melissa Marty		Nuestra Belleza Latina 2008	
Rosarito Ferrer		Business woman	
Rosita Velázquez		Actress, comedian, and singer	
Sor Isolina Ferrer		Humanitarian	
Lcda Ana Margarita Mateu		First Lady of Ponce	

== See also ==
- Concilio Interfraternitario Puertorriqueño de la Florida
- Puerto Rican fraternities and sororities
- List of social sororities and women's fraternities
