= List of Miss Puerto Rico titleholders =

These women have represented Puerto Rico in the following international beauty pageants:

- Miss World
- Miss Universe
- Miss International
- Miss Earth

== Miss World ==
The Miss World pageant began in 1951 and since then Puerto Rico has had 19 representatives classify in the finals.

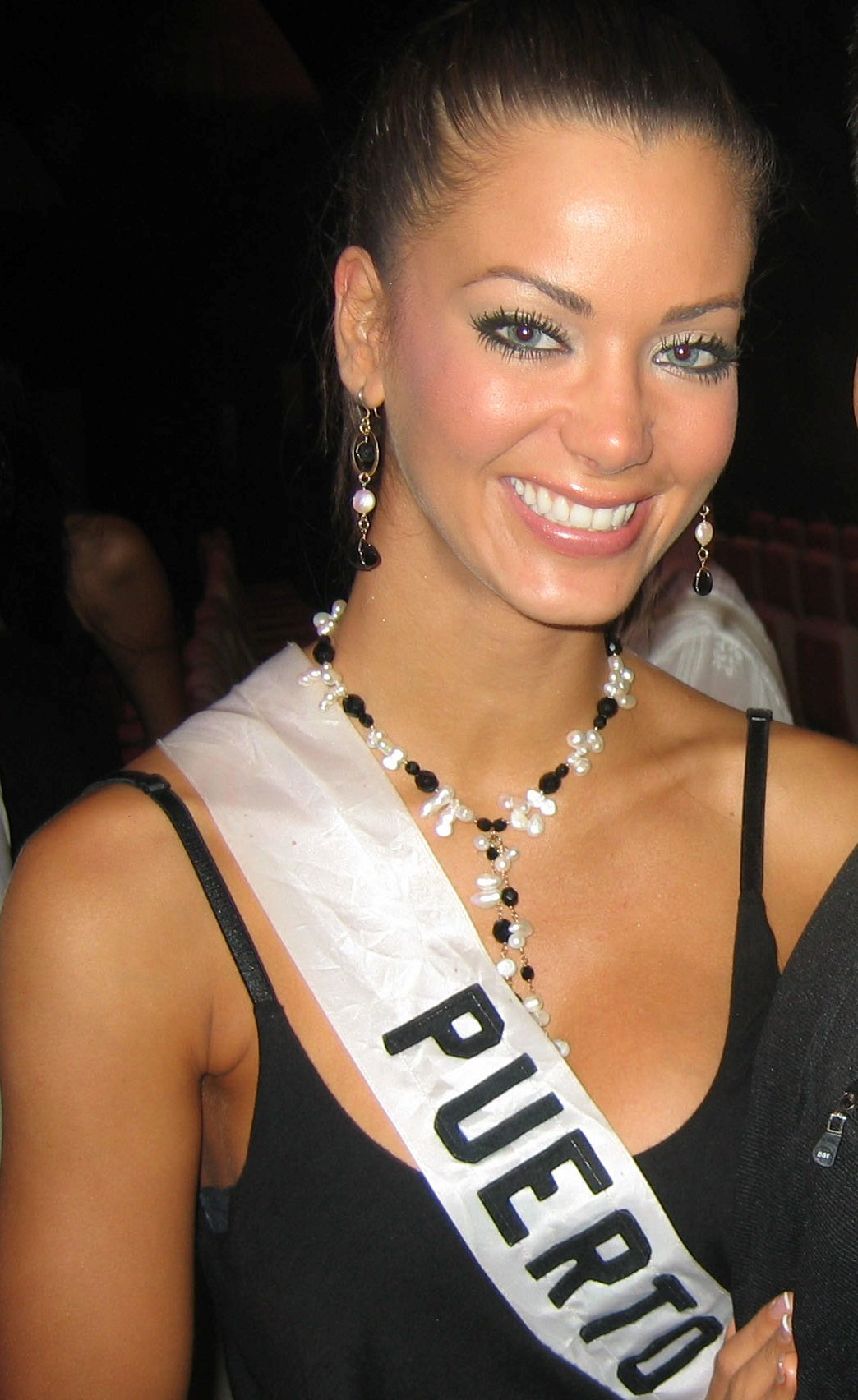
Ingrid Marie Rivera, Miss Puerto Rico World 2005 and Miss Puerto Rico Universe 2008

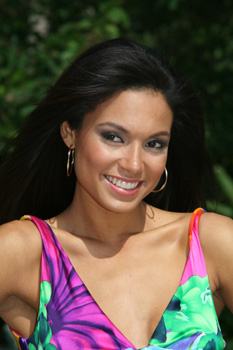
Jennifer Guevara, Miss Puerto Rico World 2007

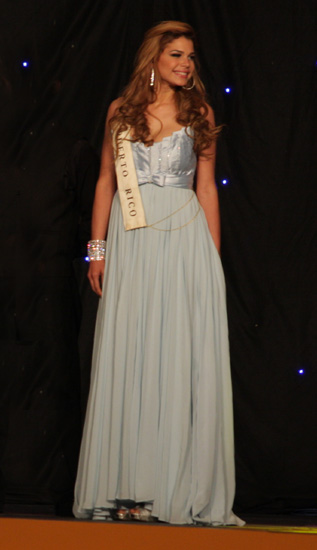
Ivonne Orsini, Miss Puerto Rico World 2008

- Winner of Miss World
- Runner-up in the Top 3 or Top 5
- Finalist in the Top 7 or Top 10
- Semi-finalist between the Top 15 and Top 25
- Quarter-finalist in the Top 30 or Top 40

Year	Representative	Placement	Award
1951	No representative		
1952	No representative		
1953	No representative		
1954	No representative		
1955	No representative		
1956	No representative		
1957	No representative		
1958	No representative		
1959	Lyllianna "Lilie" Díaz Noya		
1960	No representative		
1961	No representative		
1962	No representative		
1963	No representative		
1964	No representative		
1965	No representative		
1966	No representative		
1967	No representative		
1968	No representative		
1969	No representative		
1970	Alma Doris Perez		
1971	Raquel Quintana		
1972	Ana Nisi Goyco †		
1973	Milagros García		
1974	Loyda Eunice Valle Blas Machado		
1975	Wilnelia Merced Cruz	Miss World 1975	
1976	Ivette Rosado	Top 15	
1977	Didriana Del Rio		
1978	Maria Jesús Cañizares	Top 15	
1979	Daisy Marissette López		
1980	Michele Torres Cintrón	Top 15	
1981	Andrenira Ruiz		
1982	Jannette Torres Burgos		
1983	Fatima Mustafá Vázquez		
1984	Maria De Los Angeles Rosas Silva		
1985	Iris Matías Gonzáles	Top 15	
1986	No representative		
1987	No representative		
1988	No representative		
1989	Tania Collazo		
1990	Magdalena Pabón		
1991	Johanna Berenice Irizarry		
1992	Lianabel Rosario Centeno		
1993	Ana Rosa Brito Suárez		
1994	Joyce Marie Giraud Mojica		
1995	Swanni Quiñones Laracuente		
1996	Marissa De La Caridad Hernández		
1997	Aurea Isis Marrero Nieves		
1998	Antonia Alfonso Pagán		
1999	Arlene Torres Torres		
2000	Sarybel Velilla Cabeza		
2001	Barbara Serrano Negrón		
2002	Cassandra Polo Berríos	Top 20	
2003	Joyceline Montero García	Top 20	
2004	Cassandra Castro Holland		
2005	Ingrid Marie Rivera Santos	2nd Runner-up	Queen of Caribbean
2006	Thebyam Carrión Álvarez	Top 17	
2007	Jennifer Guevara Campos	Top 16	
2008	Ivonne Marie Orsini López	Top 15	
2009	Jennifer Colón Alvarado		
2010	Yara Liz Lasanta Santiago	Top 25	Beach Beauty
2011	Amanda Victoria Vilanova Pérez	2nd Runner-up	Queen of Caribbean
2012	Janelee Marcus Chaparro Colón	Top 30	
2013	Nadyalee Torres López		
2014	Génesis María Dávila Pérez		
2015	Keysi Marie Vargas Vélez		
2016	Stephanie Del Valle Díaz	Miss World 2016	
2017	No representative		
2018	Dayanara Martínez Rosado		
2019	Daniella Rodríguez Laureano	Top 40	
2020	No contest was held		
2021	Aryam Díaz Rosado	Top 40	
2022	Miss World 2021 was rescheduled to 16 March 2022 due to the COVID-19 pandemic outbreak in Puerto Rico, no edition started in 2022		
2023	Elena Rivera Reyes	Top 40	
2024	No contest was held		
2025	Valeria Nicole Pérez Santiago	Top 20	Beauty with a Purpose and Best Designer Dress (Americas & Caribbean)
2026	Suil Anyelina Pagán	Top 40	Sports Challenge

== Miss Universe ==
The Miss Universe pageant began in 1952 and since then Puerto Rico has had 28 representatives classify in the finals, including 5 winners, 16 runners-up, and 12 semi-finalists. With 5 wins, Puerto Rico is the third participating nation with the most wins behind USA (9 wins) and Venezuela (7 wins).

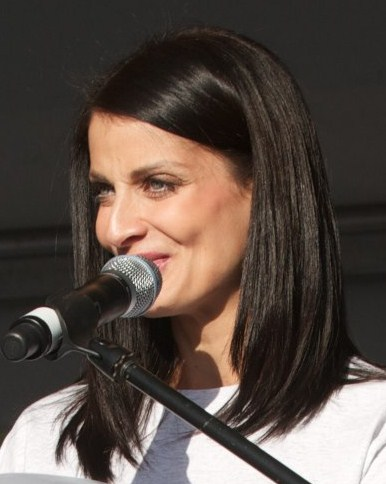
Dayanara Torres, Miss Puerto Rico Universe 1993 and Miss Universe 1993

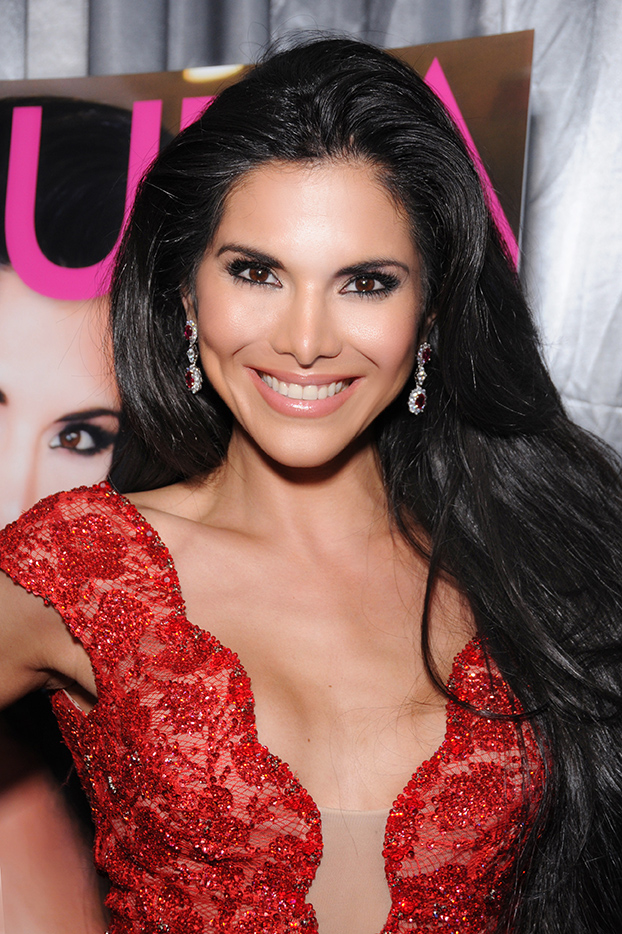
Joyce Giraud, Miss Puerto Rico Universe 1998 and Miss Puerto Rico World 1994

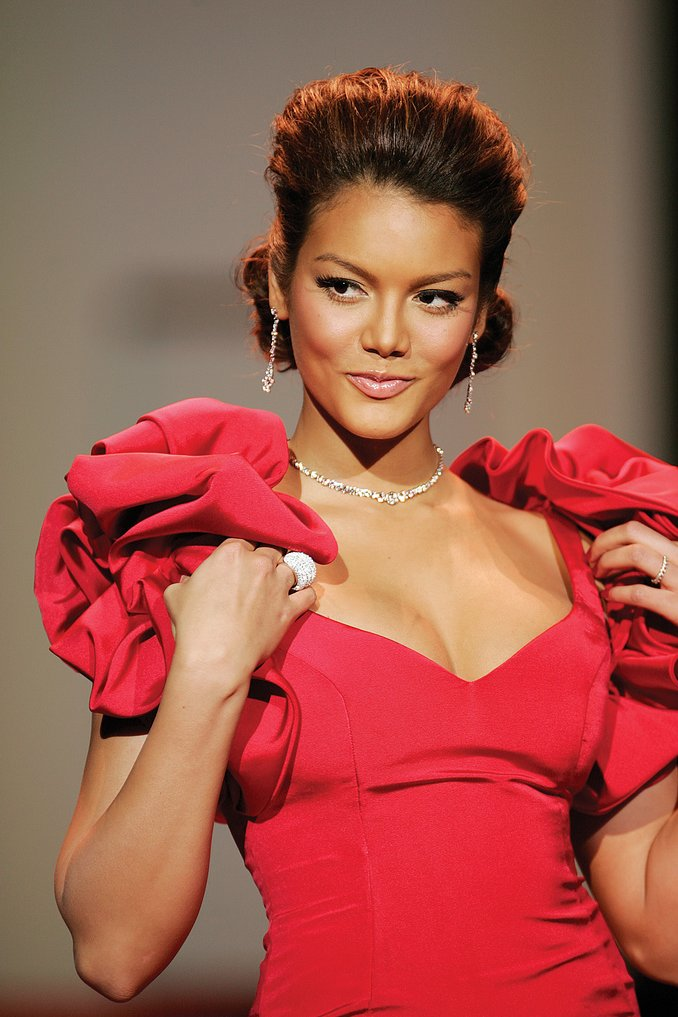
Zuleyka Rivera, Miss Puerto Rico Universe 2006 and Miss Universe 2006

- Winner of Miss Universe
- Runner-up in the Top 5 or Top 6
- Finalist in the Top 10 or Top 12
- Semi-finalist in the Top 15 or Top 16

Year	Representative	Placement	Award
1952	Marilia Levy Bernal		
1953	Wanda Irizarry		
1954	Lucy Santiago		
1955	Carmen Laura Betancourt		
1956	Paquita Vivo Colón		
1957	Mapita "Mapy" Mercado Cordero		Miss Friendship
1958	No representative		
1959	No representative		
1960	No representative		
1961	Enid Del Valle		
1962	Ana Celia Sosa		
1963	Jeanette Blascoechea		
1964	Yolanda Rodríguez Machín		
1965	Gloria Cobián Díaz		
1966	Carol Bajandas		
1967	Ivonne Coll Mendoza		
1968	Marylene Carrasquillo		
1969	Aida Betancourt		
1970	Marisol Malaret Contreras†	Miss Universe 1970	
1971	Idalia Margarita "Beba" Franco	3rd Runner-up	
1972	Bárbara Torres Viñolo		
1973	Gladys Vanessa Colón Díaz		
1974	Sonia María Stege Chardón	Top 12	
1975	Lorell Del Carmen Carmona Juan		
1976	Elizabeth Zayas Ortiz		
1977	Maria Del Mar Rivera Veglio		
1978	Ada Cecille Perkins Flores		
1979	Audrey Teresa "Tere" López Hernández		
1980	Agnes Tañón Correa	Top 12	
1981	Carmen Lotti Rodríguez		
1982	Lourdes Milagros Mantero Hormazábal		
1983	Carmen Batíz Vergara		
1984	Sandra Beauchamp Roche		
1985	Deborah Fátima Carthy-Deu	Miss Universe 1985	
1986	Elizabeth Robison Latalladi	Top 10	
1987	Laurie Tamara Simpson Rivera	4th Runner-up	
1988	Isabel María Pardo Cubeñas		
1989	Catalina María Villar Ruíz		
1990	María Luisa Fortuño Cosimi		
1991	Lizzette Marie Bouret Echevarría		
1992	Daisy García Rodríguez		
1993	Dayanara Torres Delgado	Miss Universe 1993	
1994	Brenda Esther Robles Cortés		
1995	Desirée Lowry Rodríguez	Top 6	
1996	Sarybel Velilla Cabeza		
1997	Ana Rosa Brito Suárez	Top 10	
1998	Joyce Marie Giraud Mojica	2nd Runner-up	
1999	Brenda Liz López Ramos	Top 10	Miss Photogenic
2000	Zoraida Isabel "Zoribel" Fonalledas Ferraiouli		
2001	Denise Marie Quiñones August	Miss Universe 2001	Miss Photogenic
2002	Isis Marie Casalduc González		Miss Photogenic
2003	Carla Tricoli Rodríguez		Miss Photogenic
2004	Alba Giselle Reyes Santos	2nd Runner-up	Miss Photogenic
2005	Cynthia Enid Olavarría Rivera	1st Runner-up	
2006	Zuleyka Jerrís Rivera Mendoza	Miss Universe 2006	
2007	Wilmadilis "Uma" Blasini Pérez		
2008	Ingrid Marie Rivera Santos		
2009	Mayra Matos Pérez	4th Runner-up	
2010	Mariana Paola Vicente Morales	Top 10	
2011	Viviana Ortiz Pastrana	Top 16	
2012	Bodine Koehler Peña		
2013	Monic Marie Pérez Díaz	Top 16	
2014	Gabriela Berríos Pagán		Miss Photogenic
2015	Catalina Morales Gómez		
2016	Kristhielee Yinaira Caride Santiago	Dethroned	
2016	Brenda Azaria Jiménez Hernández		
2017	Danyeshka "Danna" Hernández Valentín		
2018	Kiara Liz Ortega Delgado	Top 5	
2019	Madison Sara Anderson Berríos	1st Runner-up	
2020	Estefanía Natalia Soto Torres	Top 10	
2021	Michelle Marie Colón	Top 10	
2022	Ashley Ann Cariño	Top 5	
2023	Karla Inelisse Guilfú Acevedo	Top 5	Voice For Change (Gold Winner)
2024	Jennifer Colón Alvarado	Top 12	
2025	Zashely Nicole Alicea Rivera	Top 12	
2026	Jennifer Barreto (née Abreu Mora)	TBA	TBA

== Miss International ==
The Miss International pageant began in 1960 and since then Puerto Rico has had 15 representatives classify in the finals, including 2 winners, 1 runner-up and 12 semi-finalists.

- Winner of Miss International
- Runner-up in the Top 3 or Top 5
- Finalist in the Top 10
- Semi-finalist in the Top 12 or Top 15

Year	Representative	Placement	Award
1960	Carmen Sara Látimer		
1961	Ivette Monagas		
1962	Agnes Toro Garratón		
1963	Aida Mercado Cordero	Top 15	
1964	Zoé Sandra Foy Santiago		
1965	Iraida Palacios		
1966	The pageant was not held		
1967	Maria Felisa Seda		
1968	Elsa Maria Schroeder Méndez		
1969	No representative		
1970	No representative		
1971	Doris L. Morales		
1972	Miriam López		Miss Friendship
1973	Miriam Vargas		
1974	No representative		
1975	Gladys Salgado Castillo		
1976	Yvonne Torres García	Top 15	
1977	Marta Hernández		Miss Photogenic
1978	No representative		
1979	No representative		
1980	No representative		
1981	No representative		
1982	No representative		
1983	No representative		
1984	Sandra Beauchamp Roche	Did not compete	
1985	No representative		
1986	Elizabeth Robison Latalladi	Top 15	
1987	Laurie Tamara Simpson Rivera	Miss International 1987	
1988	Yolanda Martínez		
1989	Michele Cotto		
1990	Ana Rosa Brito Suárez		
1991	Lizaura Quiñones Torres		
1992	Dayanara Torres Delgado	Top 15	
1993	Brenda Esther Robles Cortés		
1994	Alice Marina Lee Prez		
1995	Maria Del Rocío Arroyo Rivera		
1996	Lydia Guzmán López De Victoria		
1997	Ymak Farah Fagundo Soto	Top 15	
1998	Jacqueline Negrón Olivieri	Did not compete	
1999	No representative		
2000	Rosiveliz Díaz Rodríguez		
2001	Lorena Otero Pérez		
2002	Mariela Lugo Marín		
2003	Dignelis Taymí Jiménez Hernández		
2004	Meredith Herrera Morales		
2005	Dinorah Collazo Ortiz		
2006	Sharon Haydée Gómez Díaz	Top 12	
2007	Haydil Rivera Escobales	Top 15	
2008	Miriam Ivette Pabón Carrión	Top 12	
2009	Mónica Cristina Pastrana González		
2010	Aideliz Hidalgo Betances	Top 15	
2011	Desirée Del Río De Jesús	3rd Runner-up	Miss Active
2012	Ashley Michelle Ruíz Rodríguez		
2013	Ashley Beth Pérez Calderón	Top 15	
2014	Valerie Hernández Matías	Miss International 2014	
2015	Wilmary Monción Román		
2016	Gabriela Berríos Pagán		
2017	Beverly Marie Rodríguez De León	Did not compete	
2018	Yarelis Yvette Salgado Rodríguez		
2019	Ivana Carolina Irizarry Fritany	Top 15	
2020	No contest was held		
2021	Natalia Colón Figueroa	No contest was held	
2022	Paola González Torres		
2023	Amanda Paola Pérez Solís	Top 15	
2024	Zahira Marie Pérez Gerena		
2025	Zamira Lee Allende González		
2026	Paola Michelle Martínez Otero	TBA	TBA

== Miss Earth ==
The Miss Earth pageant began in 2001 and since then Puerto Rico has had 7 representatives classify in the finals, including 1 winner, 1 runner-up and 5 finalists.

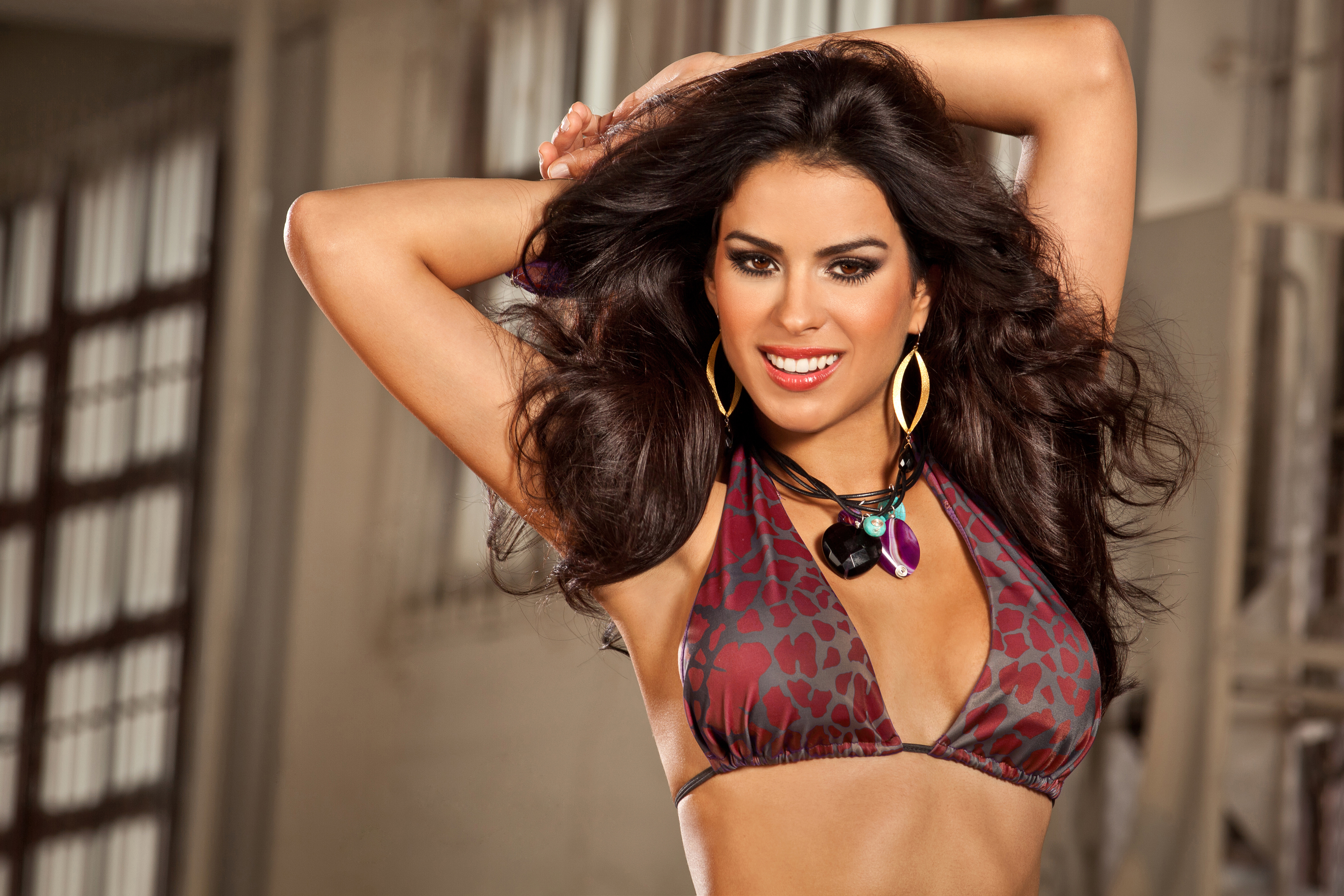
Vanessa De Roide, Miss Puerto Rico Earth 2005 and Nuestra Belleza Latina 2012

- Winner of Miss Earth
- Runner-up in the Top 4
- Finalist in the Top 8
- Semi-finalist in the Top 16

Year	Representative	Placement	Award
2001	Amaricelys Reyes Guzmán		
2002	Deidre Rodríguez Santiago		
2003	Norelis Ortiz Acosta		
2004	Shanira Mariette Blanco Colón		Miss Leonardo
2005	Vanessa De Roide Toledo	Top 8	• Best in Long Gown • Top 5 Miss Pond’s
2006	Camille Collazo Ortiz		
2007	No representative		
2008	No representative		
2009	Dignelis Taymi Jiménez Hernandez		Placenta Award
2010	Yeidy Enid Bosques Pérez	3rd Runner-up	Miss Earth Fire
2011	Agnes Eileen Benítez Santiago		
2012	Darli Arni Pacheco Montañez		
2013	Velmary Paola Cabassa Vélez	Did not compete	
2014	Franceska Toro Medina		Best Eco-Beauty Video
2015	No representative		
2016	No representative		
2017	Karla Victoria Aponte Colón		• Miss JACMI Best • Eco-Beauty Video
2018	Krystal Xamairy Rivera Barrios		Miss Pontefino Hotel
2019	Nellys Rocio Pimentel Campusano	Miss Earth 2019	
2020	Krystal Badillo Pagan	Top 8	
2021	Cristina Mariel Ríos Reyes		Best Casual Chic
2022	Paulina Nicole Avilés-Feshold	Top 8	Miss Flavor Cartel
2023	Victoria Alejandra Arocho del Valle	Top 12	
2024	Bianca Nicole Miranda Caraballo	Top 8	Vonwelt Nature Farm Ambassadress
2025	Valeria Meléndez Oyola	Withdrew	
2025	Cecilia Acosta Conley	Withdrew	
2025	No representative		
2026	Cristina Mariel Ríos Reyes	TBA	
2027	Isabella Catherina González Dapena	TBA	
