= Yeidy Bosques =

Puerto Rican model (born 1987)

- Born: Yeidy Enid Bosques Pérez; October 29, 1987 (age 38); Puerto Rico
- Height: 5 ft 11 in (1.80 m)
- Beauty pageant titleholder
- Title: Miss Earth Puerto Rico 2010; Miss Earth Fire 2010
- Hair color: Black
- Eye color: Green
- Major competitions: Miss Puerto Rico Universe 2006; (Top 13); Miss Puerto Rico Universe 2010; (3rd Runner-Up); Miss Earth 2010; (Miss Earth – Fire)

Yeidy Enid Bosques Pérez (born 1987) is a Puerto Rican model and beauty pageant titleholder who won Miss Earth Puerto Rico 2010 and Miss Earth Fire 2010.

== Beauty pageants ==
Bosques competed in two editions of the Miss Puerto Rico Universe pageant, the first time being on November 10, 2005, at the Miss Puerto Rico Universe 2006 pageant where she represented the municipality of Moca and placed as one of the thirteen semi-finalists. Four years later, she again competed at the Miss Universe Puerto Rico 2010 pageant on November 12, 2009, where she represented the municipality of Mayagüez and placed as third runner-up.

On April 22, 2010, Bosques competed in the first ever Miss Earth Puerto Rico pageant where she represented the municipality of Mayagüez. She won the competition and was crowned Miss Earth Puerto Rico 2010. She went to represent Puerto Rico at the Miss Earth 2010 pageant that was held on December 4, 2010, in Nha Trang, Vietnam where she won one of the elemental crowns Miss Earth - Fire 2010. This was Puerto Rico's highest and most recent placement until 2019 when Nellys Pimentel was crowned Miss Earth 2019 representing Puerto Rico.

Preceded by Dignelis Jiménez	Miss Earth Puerto Rico; 2010	Succeeded by Agnes Benitez
Preceded by (Spain) Alejandra Echevarría	Miss Earth - Fire; 2010	Succeeded by (Venezuela) Caroline Medina
