= Aideliz Hidalgo =

Puerto Rican model

- Born: Aideliz Hidalgo; 1986 (age 39–40); Santurce, San Juan, Puerto Rico
- Height: 5 ft 11 in (1.80 m)
- Beauty pageant titleholder
- Title: Miss Cayey Universe 2010; Miss Puerto Rico International 2010
- Hair color: Black
- Eye color: Black
- Major competitions: Nuestra Belleza Latina 2008 (9th place); Miss Universe Puerto Rico 2010 (2nd runner-up); Miss International 2010 (Top 15); Miss Exclusive of the World 2012 (1st runner-up)

Aideliz Hidalgo (born 1986 in Santurce) is a Puerto Rican beauty pageant titleholder who held the title of Miss Puerto Rico International 2010. She was the first black woman to compete in Miss International as Miss Puerto Rico.

== Career ==
=== Nuestra Belleza Latina 2008 ===
In the spring of 2008 Aideliz participated in the reality show/beauty contest Nuestra Belleza Latina. After weeks of auditions, Aideliz was selected as one of the final twelve finalists, in which she was eliminated on the fourth week of the show, finishing in ninth place.

=== Miss Universe Puerto Rico 2010 ===
On November 12, 2009, Hidalgo competed at the Miss Universe Puerto Rico 2010 pageant where she represented the state of Cayey and placed as one of the final five finalists, in which she then resulted as the second runner-up. Hidalgo also won the award for Best Catwalk in a preliminary event that was held weeks before the final night of the pageant.

=== Miss International 2010 ===
Aideliz was chosen to compete at the Miss International 2010 on November 7, 2010, in Chengdu, China. She placed in the Top 15.

- Miss Puerto Rico 2010
- Nuestra Belleza Latina

Preceded by Mónica Pastrana	Miss International Puerto Rico; 2010	Succeeded by Desirée Del Río
