= Yaritza Medina =

Puerto Rican TV host and actress

Yaritza Medina (born in Toa Alta, Puerto Rico) is a Puerto Rican actress, TV host, professional dancer, choreographer and athlete.

In one of her first appearances on TV, she participated and won a dance and modeling competition in the TV show Sábado Gigante in 2009. In 2011 and 2012 she was one of the principal dancers of the celebrity dance show Mira Quién Baila, she also participated in the reality show Nuestra Belleza Latina (2012), both produced by Univision.

Medina has appeared in countless tours, music videos, music awards and reality shows, such as MTV Music Video Awards (VMAS), Latin Billboard Awards, Premios Lo Nuestro, Premios Juventud, Yo soy el Artista and La Voz dancing with various renowned artists such as Jennifer Lopez, Marc Anthony, Chris Brown, Rihanna, Maluma, Daddy Yankee, Luis Fonsi, Pitbull, Laura Pausini, Sean Paul, Carlos Vives, Yandel, Zion & Lennox among others.

Medina was the featured dancer for the official video of the 2014 FIFA World Cup, titled "We Are One", performed by Pitbull, Jennifer Lopez and Claudia Leitte. In addition, she has been featured in multiple music videos, for example "Cheerleader" performed by Omi and "Shaky Shaky" performed by Daddy Yankee, among many others.

As a choreographer, she’s worked with Univision's Despierta América, Telemundo’s Un Nuevo Día, Teletón USA, La Banda, Coca Cola, and with a wide variety of international artists.

She was one of the hosts for the TV sports show "Republica Deportiva", broadcast by Univision.

As an actress, Medina portrayed the character "Lilly" in Telemundo's "Mariposa de Barrio" in 2017. In 2013 she portrayed "Roxy" in the soap opera "Cosita Linda" produced by Venevisión Internacional, and in 2014 she appeared in "Tierra de Reyes" produced by Telemundo.

In 2019, she starred in the television sports reality competition Exatlón Estados Unidos, broadcast by Telemundo, where she was nicknamed “La Dura” due to her physique and never give up mentality. She was also chosen as one of the sexiest participants of Exatlon by the magazine "People en Español".

Medina entered the world of fitness as a trainer, motivator and influencer with her fitness program called Dale Mija.

== Television ==
Year	Title	Role	Notes
2020-2021	En Casa con Telemundo	Herself	Fitness Collaborator
2020	El Domo del Dinero	Herself	Coach of the Blue Team
2019-2020	Exatlón Estados Unidos	Herself	Athlete
2017	Un Nuevo Dia	Herself	Choreographer
2017	Mariposa de Barrio	Lilly	Actress
2015–2016	Republica Deportiva	Herself	Host/Senadora
2015	Tierra de Reyes	Palenque Dancer	Recurring Role
2014	Cosita Linda	Roxy	Actress
2014	Yo Soy el Artista	Herself	Dancer
2012	Nuestra Belleza Latina	Herself	Reality Show
2012	Mira Quien Baila Season 2	Herself	Principal Dancer
2012–	Despierta America	Herself	Choreographer/Dancer
2012-2015	Sabado Gigante	Herself	Dancer
2011	Mira Quien Baila Season 1	Herself	Principal Dancer

== Music videos ==
Year	Artist	Song
2021	Nejo ft. Nicky Jam & Silvestre Dangond	Muy Feliz
2020	Bad Bunny	La Dificil
2019	Maluma ft. Ricky Martin	No se me Quita
2019	Anuel AA, Daddy Yankee, Ozuna, J Balvin	China
2019	Luis Fonsi ft. Nicky Jam & Sebastian Yatra	Date La Vuelta
2018	De La Ghetto ft. J Balvin	Caliente
2018	Enrique Iglesias ft. Pitbull	Move to Miami
2017	IAmChino ft. Wisin & Chacal	Amor
2016	Daddy Yankee	Shaky Shaky
2016	Borgeous ft. Sean Paul	Ride It
2016	Paulina Rubio	Si Te Vas
2015	Omi	Cheerleader
2015	Alex Sensation ft. Yandel & Shaggy	Bailame
2015	Fito Blanko	Meneo
2014	Pitbull ft. Jennifer Lopez	We Are One (FIFA 2014 World Cup)
2014	Chino y Nacho	Tu Me Quemas
2014	Kent y Tony	Tu Tiene un Noseque
2014	Angel y Khriz	Wepa
2014	Fanny Lu	Mujeres
2013	Arianna ft. Pitbull	Sexy People
2013	Flo Rida ft. Pitbull	I Can't Believe It
2013	Dasoul ft. Maffio & Fito Blanko	De Lao a Lao
2013	Alfabeto	Pegale al Piso
