= Shanira Blanco =

Puerto Rican model

- Born: Shanira Blanco Colón; August 1, 1981 (age 45); San Juan, Puerto Rico
- Spouse: Augusto Ayala (m. 2013)
- Children: 1
- Beauty pageant titleholder
- Title: Miss Amber World 2001; Miss Folklore World 2001; Miss Carolina Universe 2004; Miss Earth Puerto Rico 2004
- Hair color: Brown
- Eye color: Brown
- Major competitions: Miss Amber World 2001 (Winner); Miss Folklore World 2001 (Winner); Miss Puerto Rico Universe 2004 (2nd runner-up); Miss Earth Puerto Rico 2004 (Winner); Miss Earth 2004 (Unplaced) (Miss Leonardo Award)

Shanira Blanco Colón (born August 1, 1981) is a Puerto Rican TV host, model, influencer and beauty pageant titleholder. She is former national director of Miss Mundo de Puerto Rico, Miss Grand Puerto Rico and Miss Earth Puerto Rico.

== Personal life ==
Shanira Mariette Blanco Colón was born in San Juan, Puerto Rico to a Puerto Rican mother, María Colón, and a Dominican father, Ángel Blanco. Blanco is the oldest of three children from that marriage. In 2013 Blanco married longtime boyfriend Dr. Augusto Ayala. They had a son in 2015, Mateo Ayala Blanco.

== Beauty pageants ==
When she was 19 years old, she started competing in different beauty pageants, which made her travel the world to places like Venezuela, France, Germany, Turkey and the Philippines among others, and won Miss Amber World 2001 and Miss Folklore World 2001.

=== Miss Puerto Rico Universe 2004 ===
Blanco represented Carolina municipality at Miss Puerto Rico Universe 2004 pageant, where she finished second runner-up to Alba Reyes.

=== Miss Earth 2004 ===
Blanco represented Puerto Rico at the Miss Earth 2004. She won the Miss Leonardo award.

=== Pageant director ===
Blanco was the previous national director for the Miss World Puerto Rico, Miss Earth Puerto Rico, and Miss Grand International Puerto Rico franchises. Under her direction, Puerto Rico won the first Miss Grand International 2013 crown with beauty title holder Janelee Chaparro.

== Television career ==
After pageants, the doors to the world of television opened up for Blanco, receiving the opportunity from Puerto Rico's producer Hector Marcano in 2005, to join and co-host with his team, the television show “Que Suerte” which was transmitted through the Univisión Puerto Rico Network. It is there were Blanco grows as a TV personality, obtaining the chance to collaborate in other TV Shows like “El Gordo y la Flaca" and "Objetivo Fama", both directed to the Puerto Rican audience as well as the Hispanic market in the United States. At the same time, this young woman received the “Paoli Award” for “Outstanding New TV Talent of the Year ”, was elected as “The Most Beautiful Face on TV” by the readers of Teve Guia Magazine and was hired by the Mirta de Perales beauty company as their Hispanic market spokesperson. She has been Mirta de Perales Spokesperson since 2005. After “Que Suerte”, her TV career continued, where she received an offer from Univision PR to host the show “Flashazo VIP”, one that she accepted and continued doing it until 2012.

After Flashazo VIP, Blanco continued to appear in Univision Puerto Rico shows like Tu Mañana, Tu Mediodia and Ruben & Co.

Blanco was a presenter for Paparazzi TV.

Shanira joined Loteria Electrónica televised Live at WIPR in 2012. She is currently one of the television hosts.

2017, Univision Puerto Rico announced Blanco was returning to the network to be part of their new project " Despierta Puerto Rico". She currently hosts the "UNICAM"

In 2019, Blanco returned to daytime television hosting the new TV show “ Aqui Estamos” which means, We are Here! With Puerto Rican merengue sensation host, Manny Manuel. The show currently airs daily at 4:00pm on WIPR Television Network.

== Social media ==
Shanira has over 500,000 followers on her social media accounts (See External links for validation). Campaigns posted on her social media includes collaboration with brands like Walgreens, Dannon, Goya, Mastercard, Simon Malls, Quaker, Disney, Frito Lays, Ford, Colgate, Mc Donalds, MDA and Mirta de Perales among many more.

== Actitud Modeling Academy and Agency ==
After acquiring a bachelor's degree in marketing and a master's degree in business, Blanco established Actitud, a modeling academy and agency, in 2007.

Actitud Modeling Academy and Agency prepared delegates to the Miss World Pageant such as Ivonne Orsini, currently Telemundo TV Hosts, which placed in the semifinals in 2008 and Amanda Vilanova, which became Miss World Caribbean and second runner-up in London in 2011. Actitud also trained Miss World Puerto Rico 2012 Janelee Chaparro, who placed as quarter finalist in Miss World 2012 and eventually represented Puerto Rico in Miss Grand International 2013 where she won the first edition of this event. Valeria Vazquez Puerto Rico's first Miss Supranational 2018, was a student at Actitud in her early years as a forming model.

== See also ==
- List of television presenters
- Miss Puerto Rico 2004
- Miss Earth 2004

Awards and achievements
Preceded by Norelis Ortíz	Miss Earth Puerto Rico; 2004	Succeeded by Vanessa De Roide
