= Melissa Marty =

Puerto Rican beauty pageant winner (born 1984)

- Born: Melissa Marty Caro; July 26, 1984 (age 42); Mayagüez, Puerto Rico
- Height: 1.68 m (5 ft 6 in)
- Spouse: Nelson Rosa (m. 2015)
- Beauty pageant titleholder
- Title: Miss Caguas Universe 2008; Nuestra Belleza Latina 2008
- Hair color: Brown
- Eye color: Brown
- Major competitions: Miss Puerto Rico Universe 2008 (Top 13); Nuestra Belleza Latina 2008 (Winner)

Melissa Marty Caro (born July 26, 1984) is a Puerto Rican beauty pageant titleholder and TV Host. Marty placed as a semi-finalist in Miss Puerto Rico Universe 2008, competing as "Miss Caguas." She then became a contestant on the reality show/beauty contest Nuestra Belleza Latina, and after weeks of competition and eliminations, she won the grand prize of over $100,000, a contract with Univision and earned the title of Nuestra Belleza Latina 2008.

She is a member of Mu Alpha Phi sorority. After winning Nuestra Belleza Latina she gained national exposure and worked as an entertainment host on shows on Univision, Galavision and the Telefutura network.

In 2012, Marty moved to Los Angeles, California to pursue an acting career. In 2014, she worked as a co-host of the morning show El Coffee Break on the Azteca America network until it was cancelled on April 18, 2014.

In 2015 Marty wed longtime boyfriend Nelson Rosa.

== Filmography ==
=== Film ===
Year	Film	Role	Notes
	Shelter	Angie	Post-production
2015	Dangerous Company	Elizabeth	
2021	Sweet Navidad	Pilar Tirado	
2022	Hot Take The Depp Heard Trial	Camille Vasquez	

=== Television ===
Year	Title	Role	Notes
2008–2009	Nuestra Belleza Latina	Herself	Main role, 21 episodes
2014	Jane the virgin	Miami news anchor	1 episode
2016	Notorious	Reporter #1	1 episode
2020–present	Station 19	Michelle Alvarez	3 episodes

Awards and achievements
Preceded by (Mexico) Alejandra Espinoza	Nuestra Belleza Latina; 2008	Succeeded by (Cuba) Greidys Gil
Preceded by Jesenia Rios	Miss Caguas Universe; 2008	Succeeded by Glorimar Serrano
