= Desiree Lowry =

Puerto Rican beauty pageant contestant

Desiree Lowry Rodríguez (born June 25, 1972, in San Juan) is a Puerto Rican beauty pageant titleholder, fashion model, tv host, event coordinator, model agency owner and former pageant director for Miss Universe Puerto Rico.

== Early life ==
Lowry was born to a Puerto Rican mother and an Irish American father from Oregon. She was raised in Corozal. She speaks Spanish and English. She learned English from her father who refused to speak to her unless she spoke to him in English.

== Pageant participation ==
=== Miss Puerto Rico 1995 ===
On August 6, 1994, at Teatro Yagüez, in Mayagüez, Puerto Rico, Desiree Lowry won the title of Miss Puerto Rico 1995, gaining the right to represent Puerto Rico at Miss Universe 1995. She was crowned by Miss Puerto Rico 1979 Teresa López and Miss Puerto Rico 1984 Sandra Beauchamp.

=== Miss Universe 1995 ===
Desiree traveled to Windhoek, Namibia to compete in Miss Universe 1995 where she placed in the Top 6 (5th overall). The eventual winner was Chelsi Smith of the United States.

Preliminary competition scores:

- Swimsuit - 8.88
- Evening Gown - 9.58
- Interview - 9.54
- Preliminary Score - 9.333

Final Scores

- Interview - 9.65
- Swimsuit - 9.56
- Gown - 9.66

== Miss Universe Puerto Rico franchise ==
In 2009, Lowry, along with Luisito Vigoreaux, obtained the rights to the Miss Universe Puerto Rico franchise. Desiree's role as pageant director left her in charge with training and preparation of the island's delegate to the Miss Universe pageant. Her most successful delegate was Mayra Matos who finished as 4th Runner-Up in 2009. Other successful delegates were Mariana Vicente who finished in the Top 10 in 2010 and Viviana Ortiz and Monic Pérez who both finished in the Top 16 in 2011 and 2013 respectively. 2014 delegate Gabriela Berrios was also awarded Miss Photogenic Universe but did not place in the semifinals.

On February 5, 2018, it was announced that WME/IMG had stripped Vigoreaux and Lowry of the franchise rights and awarded rights to WAPA-TV.

== TV Host ==
- 1995: Tu Melodía - Telemundo PR
- 1997: A Fuego - Teleonce
- 2004: De Magazín - WAPA TV
- 2008: No Te Duermas - Telemundo PR
- 2009: Anda Pal' Cara' - Univisión Puerto Rico
- 2009: Buscando La Más Bella - Telemundo PR
- 2010: De Magazín, Fin De Semana - Telemundo PR

== See also ==
- List of Puerto Ricans
- Irish immigration to Puerto Rico

Awards and achievements
Preceded by (Slovakia) Silvia Lakatošová	Miss Universe 4th Runner-Up; 1995	Succeeded by (Mexico) Vanessa Guzmán
Preceded by Brenda Robles	Miss Puerto Rico; 1995	Succeeded by María del Rocío Arroyo (Miss Puerto Rico); Sarybel Velilla (Miss Universe Puerto Rico)
Preceded by Brenda Robles	Miss Puerto Rico; Reina Internacional del Cafe; 1995	Succeeded by María del Rocío Arroyo
Preceded by -	Miss Corozal; 1995	Succeeded by -
