= Agnes Benítez =

Puerto Rican model

- Born: Agnes Eileen Benítez Santiago; October 1, 1986 (age 40); Bayamón, Puerto Rico
- Height: 5 ft 8 in (1.73 m)
- Beauty pageant titleholder
- Title: Miss Cataño Universe 2009; Miss Puerto Rico Tourism Queen International 2009; Miss Cataño Earth 2011; Miss Puerto Rico Earth 2011
- Hair color: Brown
- Eye color: Brown

Agnes Benítez is a Puerto Rican beauty pageant titleholder who won Miss Earth Puerto Rico 2011 and represented the territory at Miss Earth 2011.

== Beauty Pageants ==
=== Miss Puerto Rico Universe 2009 ===
On October 22, 2008, Agnes competed at the Miss Puerto Rico Universe 2009 pageant representing the state of Cataño. Agnes became one of the final six finalists in which she then placed as the 4th Runner-up.

=== Nuestra Belleza Latina 2009 ===
In the spring of 2009 Agnes participated in Univision's reality contest Nuestra Belleza Latina 2009, where she placed as one of the twenty semi-finalists, but was eliminated right before the final twelve finalists were chosen.

=== Miss Tourism Queen International 2009 ===
On August 28, 2009, Agnes competed at the Miss Tourism Queen International 2009 pageant representing her country Puerto Rico.

Preceded by Cassandra Castro	Miss Puerto Rico Tourism Queen International; 2009	Succeeded by TBD
