= Nuestra Belleza Latina 2008 =

- Season 2
- Presented by: Giselle Blondet
- Judges: Osmel Sousa; Lupita Jones; Julian Gil
- Winner: Melissa Marty
- Runner-up: Emeraude Toubia
- No. of episodes: 13

Release
- Original network: Univision
- Original release: February 29 – May 16, 2008

Season chronology
- ← Previous; Nuestra Belleza Latina 2007 Next → Nuestra Belleza Latina 2009

Nuestra Belleza Latina 2008 is the second season of Nuestra Belleza Latina, which premiered in February 2008 on Univision. Auditions were once again held in five major U.S. cities (Los Angeles; Houston; Miami; Chicago; and New York City) and in San Juan, Puerto Rico. During the audition process, 75 young women were given passes to the semifinals in Miami, Florida. The elimination process was quick, with 15 women leaving the first week, 40 in the second week, and finally, on March 28, 2008, eight women were eliminated leaving the 12 finalists who moved into a Miami mansion, where they lived for the rest of the competition.

Each week, viewers had the chance to vote for their favorite finalists. The three contestants with the fewest votes each week were in danger of being eliminated, with two being saved, one by her fellow finalists and the other by the judges. Melissa Marty, who represented Puerto Rico, won the competition, while Emeraude Toubia, who represented Mexico and Lebanon, placed second.

== Changes ==
There were some major changes to the series in the second season; two of the judging panel, Carlos Calderon and Alicia Machado, left the show. Their replacements were beauty queen/model Lupita Jones and actor/model Julián Gil. Osmel Sousa maintained the role of head judge, and was tougher when he chose the girls throughout auditions.

Alejandra Espinoza became a correspondent for the series, interviewing the contestants backstage. The show was moved from Tuesdays to Fridays, airing at 10pm/9c.

== Judges ==
- Osmel Sousa
- Lupita Jones
- Julián Gil

== Elimination chart ==
Contestants Chart
Top 12	Winner	1st Runner-Up

Safe	Won the challenge of the week	Bottom 3	Bottom 2	Eliminated

Stage:		Finals						Finale
Week:		4/4	4/11	4/18	4/25	5/2	5/9	5/16
Place	Contestant	Result						
1	Melissa Marty	Safe	Safe	Bottom 2	Safe	Safe	Safe	Winner
2	Emeraude Toubia	Safe	Safe	Safe	Safe	Safe	Safe	Runner-Up
3	Dayami Padron	Safe	Bottom 3	Safe	Bottom 2	Bottom 2	Safe	3rd Place
4	Zoila Ceballos	Safe	Safe	Safe	Safe	Safe	Safe	4th Place
5	Leticia Castro	Safe	Safe	Safe	Safe	Safe	Bottom 2	5th Place
6	Manuela Arbeláez	Safe	Bottom 2	Bottom 3	Bottom 3	Bottom 3	Bottom 3	6th Place
7	Natalia Rivera	Safe	Safe	Safe	Safe	Safe	7th Place	
8	Genesis Seguias	Bottom 2	Safe	Safe	Safe	8th Place		
9	Aideliz Hidalgo	Safe	Safe	Safe	9th Place			
10	Dayanira Varela	Bottom 3	Safe	10th Place				
11	Leana Astorga	Safe	11th Place					
12	Jannet Manzanarez	12th Place						

== Countries represented ==
CPW	Country	Position							Year Previously Won
		1	2	3	4	5	6	7	Year Previously Won
check	Puerto Rico	2nd	5th	1st	6th	2nd	5th	Winner	2008
check	Mexico	7th	2nd	6th	1st	1st	1st	2nd	2007
—	Cuba	3rd	1st	4th	5th	5th	4th	3rd	None
—	Dominican Republic	1st	3rd	3rd	2nd	3rd	2nd	4th	None
—	Colombia	6th	6th	5th	4th	4th	3rd	5th	None
—	Venezuela	5th	4th	2nd	3rd	6th			None
—	Nicaragua	4th	7th						None

- Eliminated
- First Place
- CPW: Countries Previously Won
- : Countries Previously Won

== Contestants ==
Rank	Contestant	Country Representing
Winner	Melissa Marty	Puerto Rico
Runner-Up	Emeraude Toubia	Mexico
3rd Place	Dayami Padron	Cuba
4th Place	Zoila Ceballos	Dominican Republic
5th Place	Leticia Castro	Mexico
6th Place	Manuela Arbeláez	Colombia
7th Place	Natalia Rivera	Puerto Rico
8th Place	Genesis Seguias	Venezuela
9th Place	Aideliz Hidalgo	Puerto Rico
10th Place	Dayanira Varela	Mexico
11th Place	Leana Astorga	Nicaragua
12th Place	Jannet Manzanarez	Mexico

== Episodes ==
=== Episode 1: "Castings LA, Miami & Houston" ===
- Original Air Date: February 29, 2008

The best of the auditions held in Los Angeles, Miami and Houston.

The Guest Judges:

Judge	Audition location
Carmen Jara	Los Angeles
Lupita Jones	Miami
Raul Brindis	Houston

The following contestants were chosen:

Contestant	Audition location
Dayanira Varela	Los Angeles
Leticia Castro	Los Angeles
Dayami Padron	Miami
Genesis Seguias	Miami
Emeraude Toubia	Houston

=== Episode 2: "Castings NY, Chicago and Puerto Rico" ===
- Original Air Date: March 7, 2008

The best of the auditions held in New York, Chicago and Puerto Rico.

The Guest Judges:

Judge	Audition location
Lupita Jones	Chicago
Julian Gil	Puerto Rico
Cynthia Olavarria	Puerto Rico
Kika Roca	New York City

The following contestants were chosen:

Contestant	Audition location
Zoila Ceballos	New York City
Manuela Arbeláez	New York City
Leana Astorga	New York City
Janet Manzanarez	Chicago
Melissa Marty	Puerto Rico
Natalia Rivera	Puerto Rico
Aideliz Hidalgo	Puerto Rico

=== Episode 3: "Second Round in Miami" ===
- Original Air Date: March 14, 2008

The 75 selected girls go to Miami. They receive classes and hit the runway for the first time. The judges eliminate 15 of them.

=== Episode 4: "Weather Prompter" ===
- Original Air Date: March 21, 2008

The third round of eliminations. The 60 remaining girls face a new challenge: they have to be the "weather girl". Just 20 of them make the cut.

=== Episode 5: "Talent Showcase" ===
- Original Air Date: March 28, 2008

All the selected girls go to Miami. The judges evaluate them on stage and pick 20 semifinalists that have a talent to show onstage; but only the 12 of them named as finalists have the chance to perform in front of a live audience. The television audience gets to vote for the first time.

The Final 12:

Contestant	Country Representing
Melissa Marty	Puerto Rico
Emeraude Toubia	Mexico/Lebanon
Dayami Padron	Cuba
Zoila Ceballos	Dominican Republic
Leticia Castro	Mexico
Manuela Arbeláez	Colombia
Natalia Rivera	Puerto Rico
Genesis Seguias	Venezuela
Aideliz Hidalgo	Puerto Rico
Dayanira Varela	Mexico
Leana Astroga	Nicaragua
Jannet Manzanarez	Mexico

=== Episode 6: "Extreme Runway" ===
- Original Air Date: April 4, 2008

The 12 finalists move to the "Mansion of the Beauty", where they start their physical training. They also have to face their first challenge: walk through a 10-inch-wide runway, wearing a tight dress, over a pool. At the end of the show, Jannete Manzanares is eliminated.

=== Episode 7: "Mr. Frog's Soap Opera" ===
- Original Air Date: April 11, 2008

The 11 remaining girls have to face the challenge of the week: after receiving an acting class from a soap opera star, they play a princess role in a fairy tale scene, where towards the end they must kiss a frog. At the end of the show, Leana Astorga is eliminated.

=== Episode 8: "Sabado Gigante Model" ===
- Original Air Date: April 18, 2008

The 10 remaining girls visit the studio of one of the longest running variety shows on television, Sabado Gigante. Their challenge is to act as models, saying the lines of an imaginary cereal's ad. At the end of the show, Dayanira Varela is eliminated.

=== Episode 9: "Underwater Photoshoot" ===
- Original Air Date: April 25, 2008

The 9 remaining finalists face the challenge of the week: doing an underwater photoshoot with stars' photographer Raul Higuera, in the house pool, holding their breath. The winner gets to meet Colombian singer Juanes at one of his concerts. At the end of the show, Aideliz Hidalgo is eliminated.

=== Episode 10: "Shampoo Audition" ===
- Original Air Date: May 2, 2008

The 8 remaining finalists receive a visit from singer-songwriter Jeremias at the house. The challenge of the week is an audition for a shampoo TV ad in front of real clients. Genesis Seguias, the winner, receives $10,000 in cash but, at the end of the show, she is eliminated based on the audience votes.

=== Episode 11: "Memory Game" ===
- Original Air Date: May 9, 2008

The 7 remaining girls go to a department store where they take a look at a mannequin for 10 seconds and have to mimic its clothes in less than 10 minutes. Later, live on the show, they have to model their outfits with style. Melissa Marty is the winner of the $10,000 cash prize. At the end of the show, Natalia Rivera is eliminated.

=== Episode 12: "The Big Finale 2008" ===
- Original Air Date: May 16, 2008

The results show. For the second year, the people have voted for their favorite. The 6 remaining contestants receive a final evaluation by the judges before they get to know their position. At the end of the show, Melissa Marty is crowned "Nuestra Belleza Latina 2008".

=== Episode 13: "El Destape 2008" ===
- Original Air Date: May 25, 2008

Considered the best of this year's series. Deleted and extended scenes, backstage cameras, behind the scenes footage, interviews with the six finalists, the judges and the coaches.

== Call-Out Order ==
Giselle's Call-Out Order
Order	Episodes											
Order	Top 12	1	2	3	4	5	6	7 (Finale)				Top 2
1	Melissa	Emeraude	Dayami	Melissa	Melissa	Emeraude	Emeraude	Melissa	Emeraude	Emeraude	Emeraude	Melissa
2	Emeraude	Zoila	Emeraude	Emeraude	Emeraude	Natalia	Melissa	Emeraude	Zoila	Dayami	Melissa	Emeraude
3	Dayami	Natalia	Melissa	Natalia	Natalia	Leticia	Zoila	Leticia	Melissa	Melissa	Dayami	
4	Zoila	Melissa	Zoila	Genesis	Zoila	Melissa	Manuela	Zoila	Dayami	Zoila		
5	Leticia	Dayami	Natalia	Zoila	Leticia	Zoila	Leticia	Dayami	Leticia			
6	Manuela	Dayanira	Genesis	Aideliz	Genesis	Manuela	Dayami	Manuela				
7	Natalia	Leana	Leticia	Melissa	Manuela	Dayami	Natalia					
8	Genesis	Aideliz	Aideliz	Dayami	Dayami	Genesis						
9	Aideliz	Genesis	Dayanira	Manuela	Aideliz							
10	Dayanira	Leticia	Manuela	Dayanira								
11	Leana	Manuela	Leana									
12	Janet	Janet										

The contestant won the challenge of the week
The contestant was eliminated
The contestant won the challenge of the week, but was eliminated
The contestant became the runner-up
The contestant won the competition

=== Contestants notes ===
- Melissa Marty competed in Miss Puerto Rico Universe 2008 where she landed a position in the Top 13.
- Aideliz Hidalgo competed in Miss Universe Puerto Rico 2010, where she placed as 2nd Runner-up. She former Miss Puerto Rico International 2010 and semifinalist in Miss International 2010.
- Natalia Rivera competed in Miss Puerto Rico Teen 2006, where she won the title.
- (Mexico) Dayanira Varela competed in Nuestra Belleza México 2006 representing Zacatecas.
- (Dominican Republic) Zoila Ceballos competed in Protagonistas First Season but was voted off in top 36.

Preceded by Alejandra Espinoza	Nuestra Belleza Latina 2008; Melissa Marty	Succeeded by Greidys Gil
