= Mariana Vicente =

Puerto Rican pageant titleholder (born 1989)

- Born: Mariana Paola Vicente Morales; January 8, 1989 (age 37); San Juan, Puerto Rico
- Occupations: Model, actress, artist, blogger
- Height: 5 ft 8 in (1.73 m)
- Spouse: Enrique Hernández (m. 2018)
- Children: 2
- Beauty pageant titleholder
- Title: Miss Río Grande Universe 2010; Miss Universe Puerto Rico 2010
- Hair color: Blonde
- Eye color: Green
- Major competitions: Miss Universe Puerto Rico 2010 (Winner) (L'Bel Face Award) (JcPenney Best Style) (Holsum Light Best Figure) (Payless Best Catwalk); Miss Universe 2010 (Top 10)

Mariana Paola Vicente Morales (born January 8, 1989) is a Puerto Rican actress, model and beauty pageant titleholder who was crowned Miss Universe Puerto Rico 2010 and placed in the Top 10 at the 2010 Miss Universe pageant held in Las Vegas, Nevada.

== Early life ==
Vicente was born on January 8, 1989 in San Juan, Puerto Rico and is the oldest of four children, Ramón, Claudia Sofia and Sebastián. Her father, Ramón Vicente, is a businessman and her mother, Izayma Morales, works in public relations.

== Miss Universe Puerto Rico 2010 ==
Vicente represented Rio Grande at the Miss Universe Puerto Rico 2010 pageant, held on November 12, 2009, in San Juan, where she won several awards including: L'Bel Face, JcPenney Best Style, Holsum Light Best Figure and Payless Best Catwalk, gaining the right to represent Puerto Rico in Miss Universe 2010, broadcast live from Las Vegas, Nevada on August 23, 2010, where she placed in the top 10. She was the fourth blonde woman to represent Puerto Rico at Miss Universe after Ada Perkins in 1978, Laurie Simpson in 1987 and Uma Blasini in 2007. She is represented by Element Model Management in Puerto Rico, directed by Ann La Place.

== Personal life ==
She is married to Major League Baseball player Enrique Hernández.

== Filmography ==
=== Film ===
Year	Title	Role	Notes
2006	Angels Perdido	Maria	
2008	My Summer with Amanda	Amanda's Friend	
2015	The D-Train	Hot Girl	
2015	Hot Tub Time Machine 2	Shot Girl	
2015	Get Hard	Alissa's Friend	
2015	Self/less	Leah	
2015	Joe Dirt 2: Beautiful Loser	Flight Attendant #2	
2015	Nocturna	Lydia Sonata	
2017	The Lucky Man	Rebecca	
2018	5 Weddings	Alexa Dupont	
2018	Speed Kills	Cocktail Waitress	
2020	Chick Fight	Marnie	
2023	Letters to Santa	Candace	

=== Television ===
Year	Title	Role	Notes
2009	Miss Universe Puerto Rico 2010	Herself/Miss Río Grande	Winner
2010	Miss Universe 2010	Herself/Miss Puerto Rico	Top 10
2012-2019	The Bold and the Beautiful	Pearl (Forrester Model)	6 episodes
2012	Illegal	Piedad (Young)	1 episode
2013	Adam Devine's House Party	Gorgeous Girl	1 episode
2013	American Horror Story: Coven	Gwen	Episode: The Axeman Cometh
2014	American Horror Story: Freak Show	Waitress Carol	2 episodes
2015	Scream Queens	Christina	Episode: Haunted House
2017	Ozark	Blonde Hooker (Fantasy)	1 episode
2020	Kidding	Amber	2 episodes
2020	Lucifer	Venus Hyatt	

=== Music videos ===
Year	Title	Performer	Director
2017	"Mi Religión"	Yandel	Carlos Pérez

Awards and achievements
Preceded by Mayra Matos (Cabo Rojo)	Miss Universe Puerto Rico; 2010	Succeeded by Viviana Ortiz (Corozal)
Preceded by Patricia Quiñones	Miss Río Grande Universe; 2010	Succeeded by Bodine Koehler
