= Dignelis Jiménez =

Puerto Rican model

- Born: Dignelis Taymí Jiménez Hernández; Arecibo, Puerto Rico
- Height: 5 ft 7 in (1.70 m)
- Beauty pageant titleholder
- Hair color: Brown
- Eye color: Brown
- Major competitions: Miss International 2003; Miss Tourism World 2003; Miss Earth 2009

Dignelis Taymí Jiménez Hernández (born 1984 in Arecibo, Puerto Rico) is a Puerto Rican beauty pageant titleholder, who held the title of Miss Puerto Rico Earth 2009.

Jiménez competed in Miss International 2003, and in Miss Tourism World 2003 she became one of the final five finalists and eventually placed as second runner-up. On November 22, 2009, Jiménez competed in Miss Earth 2009.
