= Miss Universe Puerto Rico =

National beauty pageant in Puerto Rico

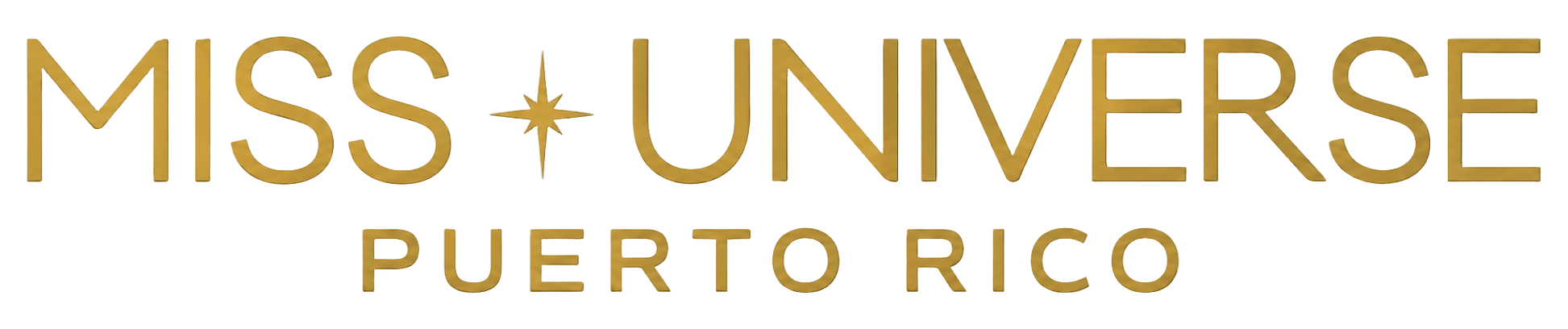
- Abbreviation: MUPR
- Formation: 1952; 74 years ago
- Founded at: San Juan
- Type: Woman's beauty pageant
- Headquarters: Guaynabo
- Members: Miss Universe
- Official language: Spanish; English
- Owner: Hemisphere Media Group; WAPA-TV
- Executive strategist: Yizette Cifredo
- National director: Nicole Colón
- Awards: 5 Miss Universe titles: 1970, 1985, 1993, 2001, 2006
- Website: muniversepr.com

Miss Universe Puerto Rico, previously known as Miss Puerto Rico Universe, Miss Puerto Rico, Miss Puerto Rico Beauty, Miss El Imparcial, and Miss Borinquen, is an annual beauty pageant operated by the organization of the same name since its inception in 1952. Established in San Juan, the capital city and municipality of Puerto Rico, it is responsible for selecting and preparing the delegate representing the archipelago and island in the Miss Universe international competition, one of the Big Four beauty pageants.

Since 2018, the Miss Universe franchise in Puerto Rico is owned by the media conglomerate Hemisphere Media Group, which manages it under its subsidiary WAPA-TV as the "Miss Universe Puerto Rico" pageant and organization. Television host and former beauty queen Nicole Colón acts as national director under the purview of executive strategist Yizette Cifredo, a television host, motivational speaker, writer, and former beauty queen.

Contestants are selected via in-person castings early in the year. Representing a municipality, they undergo months of training under the Heel Camp program, a series of workshops led by experts that focus on image, stage presence, communication, emotional intelligence, social service, leadership, and female empowerment. The winner continues to be prepared under the program until she goes to compete internationally.

The reigning Miss Universe Puerto Rico is Jennifer Barreto of San Sebastián. Barreto was crowned at the 70th edition of the pageant, celebrated in Caguas on June 25, 2026. She is the 72nd delegate to represent Puerto Rico at Miss Universe, which will celebrate its 75th edition in November.

== History ==
=== Franchisees ===
This list includes the name, franchisee, and director of the Miss Universe franchise in Puerto Rico in ascending order from the establishment of the franchise in 1952 to the present.

Span		Name	Franchisee	Director	Ref(s)
Period	Year(s)	Name	Franchisee	Director	Ref(s)
Present-2018	To begin in 2027	Miss Universe Puerto Rico	Hemisphere Media Group (WAPA-TV)	Nicole Colón	
Present-2018	5	Miss Universe Puerto Rico	Hemisphere Media Group (WAPA-TV)	Yizette Cifredo	
Present-2018	4	Miss Universe Puerto Rico	Hemisphere Media Group (WAPA-TV)	Denise Quiñones	
2017–2010	8	Miss Universe Puerto Rico	Luisito Vigoreaux and Desireé Lowry	Desireé Lowry	
2009–2003	7	Miss Puerto Rico Universe	Magali Febles		
2002–1999	4	Miss Puerto Rico Universe	TeleOnce	Francisco and Itza Cordero	
1998–1996	3	Miss Universe Puerto Rico	Telemundo Puerto Rico	Francisco and Itza Cordero	
1995–1962	33	Miss Puerto Rico	Anna Santisteban		
1961	1	Miss Puerto Rico	Puerto Rican League Against Cancer	Tony Beacon	
1958–1960	3	The Miss Universe franchise remained unclaimed in Puerto Rico from 1958 to 1960.			
1957	1	Miss El Imparcial	El Imparcial	Miguel Angel Yumet	
1956	1	Miss Puerto Rico Beauty	Puerto Rico Psychopedagogical Institute	Miguel Angel Yumet	
1955–1953	3	Miss El Imparcial	El Impacial	Miguel Angel Yumet	
1952	1	Miss Borinquen	Weldon Farms and El Imparcial	Miguel Angel Yumet	

In 1952, Miss Universe was founded, granting its franchise in Puerto Rico to Weldon Farms, producers of Leche Alba (Milk Alba), and the El Imparcial newspaper, which named it "Miss Borinquen," after the indigenous Taíno name of the main island. From 1953 to 1955, the franchise was held solely by the newspaper, which eponymously renamed it "Miss El Imparcial." In 1956, the Puerto Rico Psychopedagogical Institute acquired the franchise under the name of "Miss Puerto Rico Beauty." In 1957, the El Imparcial regained the franchise as the "Miss El Imparcial." Journalist Miguel Angel Yumet served as national director.

From 1958 to 1960, the franchise remained unclaimed in Puerto Rico. With no local pageant held or titleholder crowned, Puerto Rico was absent from the international competition.

In 1961, the Puerto Rican League Against Cancer acquired the franchise under the name of "Miss Puerto Rico." Journalist Tony Beacon acted as director, while the businesswoman in the modeling and beauty industry Anna Santisteban served as trainer of the contestants. From 1962 to 1995, the franchise was held by Santisteban under the same name of "Miss Puerto Rico." Santisteban, who was a former beauty queen, also acted as national director.

From 1996 to 1998, the television station Telemundo Puerto Rico acquired the franchise under the new name of "Miss Universe Puerto Rico." From 1999 to 2002, the franchise was held by the television station TeleOnce, which renamed it "Miss Puerto Rico Universe." Francisco "Paquitín" and Itza Cordero acted as national directors, while beautician Magali Febles and model agent Desireé Lowry acted as expert consultants.

From 2003 to 2009, Febles, who began working with the delegates of Puerto Rico in the early 1990s, held the franchise under the same name. Febles also acted as national director. From 2010 to 2017, television producer Luisito Vigoreaux and Desireé Lowry held the franchise under the name of "Miss Universe Puerto Rico." Lowry, who was Miss Puerto Rico 1995, served as national director.

Since 2018, the franchise is held by the media conglomerate Hemisphere Media Group. The organization is based in the headquarters of subsidiary WAPA-TV. In 2025, Hemisphere Media Group signed a multi-year contract with the Miss Universe Organization, extending its rights over the franchise for 5 years, until 2030. Miss Universe 2001 Denise Quiñones acted as director from 2018 to 2021, when TV host, motivational speaker, writer, and former beauty queen Yizette Cifredo took over the role. In 2024, Cifredo was awarded the "Beyond the Crown" award by the Miss Universe organization for her work as director. In 2027, Cifredo was promoted to guide and lead the organization and pagent as executive strategist, while TV host and former beauty queen Nicole Marie Colón Rivera was chosen to manage everyday operations as national director.

=== Contestant selection ===
Under ownership of the El Imparcial newspaper in the 1950s, the contestant selection process required applicants to submit a headshot portrait to the newspaper, which would convene a panel of judges to select contestants for the pageant based on the photographs. The contestants who would compete on the final night of the pagent were chosen by the public via slips published daily for two to four weeks on the El Imparcial. Contestants represented municipalities or sponsors during this period.

Under the leadership of Anna Santisteban, the contestant selection process varied. In the 1960s, in-person open call castings, as well as minor pageants divided by large metropolitan area (San Juan, Ponce, and Mayagüez) were used to select contestants for the pageant. Constestants wore numbers as markers, as they did not represent any entity during this period.

When contestants began to permanently represent municipalities in 1973, minor pageants divided by municipality were used to select contestants for the pageant. This process lasted through the end of Santisteban's ownership of the franchise in 1995.

Succeeding franchisees have relied on in-person open call castings to select contestants for the pageant. In 2026, a virtual open call casting was first used as part of the contestant selection process.

=== Host country or territory ===
This list includes Miss Universe editions held in Puerto Rico in ascending order from the establishment of the pageant in 1952 to the present.

Year	Edition	Venue	Location	Ref(s)
2026	75th	José Miguel Agrelot Coliseum	San Juan	
2002	51th	Roberto Clemente Coliseum	San Juan	
2001	50th	Rubén Rodríguez Coliseum	Bayamón	
1972	21st	Cerromar Beach Hotel	Dorado	List

The Government of Puerto Rico has used public funds to host Miss Universe in 1972, 2001, 2002, and 2026, organizing the pagent in the archipelgo and island on its own without a partnership with the local franchise. In 1972, Puerto Rico hosted Miss Universe 1972, making it the first country or territory outside the United States proper to host the pageant. Puerto Rico had been scheduled to host the Miss Universe and Miss USA pageants for 5 years from 1972 to 1976 for an investment of $200,000 per year, as agreed on the contract signed between the Puerto Rico Economic Development Administration and the Miss Universe Organization in 1971. However, the Puerto Rico Justice Department annulled the agreement in 1973, as the Administration did not have the authority to enter into contracts extending more than one fiscal year. The Miss Universe Organization sued the Puerto Rican government in response, but it later withdrew the lawsuit.

In 2001, the pageant returned to Puerto Rico, which became the first participating country or territory (excluding the United States) to win the international title of Miss Universe as a host, with the crowing of the Puerto Rican contestant, Denise Quiñones, as Miss Universe 2001. The Puerto Rico Tourism Company invested $2.5 million for the pageant. In 2002, the pageant stayed in Puerto Rico to celebrate Miss Universe 2002. The municipality of San Juan, the host city, made an investment of $2.5 million for the pageant.

In 2026, the pageant is scheduled to return to Puerto Rico for an investment of $8.7 million by the Puerto Rico Tourism Company. The initial contract called for a $9 million investment, but the amount was reduced after the original agreement was renegotiated in view of accusations of lack of transparency at Miss Universe 2025 and reported legal troubles of the co-owner of the organization, Raúl Rocha.

== Editions ==
This list includes the winner, municipality, date, entrants, venue, presenter, performer, special guest, and broadcaster of Miss Universe Puerto Rico editions in ascending order from the inaugural edition of the pageant in 1952 to the present. The editions are divided by the franchise holder under which they were organized.

=== Miss Universe Puerto Rico (2018–present) ===
Since 2018, the Hemisphere Media Group media conglomerate holds the Miss Universe franchise under the name of "Miss Universe Puerto Rico." It manages the franchise under its subsidiary WAPA-TV. Denise Quiñones acted as national director from 2018 to 2021, when Yizette Cifredo took over the role.

Year	Ed.	Winner	Rep.	Date	Entrants	Venue	Location	Presenter(s)		Co-presenter(s)				Performer(s)	Special guest (Note: A Miss Universe titleholder was present at the pageant.)	Broadcaster (Note: Name of television broadcaster and its main channel in Puerto Rico when pageant was held.)	Ref(s)
Year	Ed.	Winner	Rep.	Date	Entrants	Venue	Location	Presenter(s)		Mezzanine		Backstage		Performer(s)	Special guest	Broadcaster	Ref(s)
2026	70th	Jennifer Barreto (née Abreu Mora) (Note: Miss Universe Puerto Rico 2026 Jennifer Barreto (née Abreu Mora) became the first titleholder to be married and second to be a mother. Mothers and married women were allowed to compete for the first time in Miss Universe 2023.)	San Sebastián	June 25, 2026	35	Centro de Bellas Artes Ángel O. Berríos	Caguas	José Santana	Viviana Ortiz	Bryan Villarini	Catherine Castro	Zoe Nuñiz and Ángel Laguer	Samarys Barbot	Camerata Coral de Puerto Rico, Elvis Crespo, El Blachy, and Ken-Y	—N/a	WAPA-TV (Channel 4)	
2025	69th	Zashely Nicole Alicea Rivera	Dorado	August 14, 2025	23	Centro de Bellas Artes Luis A. Ferré	San Juan	José Santana	Diane Ferrer	Bryan Villarini	Catherine Castro	Zoe Nuñiz and Ángel Laguer	Viviane Díaz Arroyo	Camerata Pops, DJ King Arthur, Christian Daniel, Jowell, Algareplena, and Aquiles (Note: During the swimsuit competition, the semifinalists performed to the beat of Daddy Yankee’s "Sonríele" while the song’s music video was played in the background. However, the singer was not present at the event.)	Miss Universe 2006 Zuleyka Rivera	WAPA-TV (Channel 4)	
2024	68th	Jennifer Colón Alvarado (Note: Miss Universe Puerto Rico 2024 Jennifer Colón Alvarado became the first titleholder to be a mother and divorcee, as well as the first to be over the age of 28 years old. Mothers and married women were allowed to compete for the first time in Miss Universe 2023. Women over the age of 28 years old were allowed to compete for the first time in Miss Universe 2024.)	Orocovis	June 27, 2024	28	Centro de Bellas Artes Luis A. Ferré	San Juan	José Santana	Diane Ferrer	Bryan Villarini	Catherine Castro	Ashley Beth Pérez and Brenda Rivera		Luis Enrique, Silvestre Dangond, and Barrileras de 8m	Miss Universe 2023 Sheynnis Palacios	WAPA-TV (Channel 4)	
2023	67th	Karla Inelisse Guilfú Acevedo	Patillas	August 24, 2023	30	Centro de Bellas Artes Luis A. Ferré	San Juan	José Santana	Estefanía Soto	Bryan Villarini	Diane Ferrer	Ashley Beth Pérez and Brenda Rivera		Carlos Vives, Luis Figueroa, and Tommy Torres	—N/a	WAPA-TV (Channel 4)	
2022	66th	Ashley Ann Barreto Cariño	Fajardo	August 11, 2022	28	Centro de Bellas Artes Luis A. Ferré	San Juan	Julio Rivera-Saniel	Estefanía Soto	Bryan Villarini	Diane Ferrer	Ashley Beth Pérez and Brenda Rivera		Víctor Manuelle and Jencarlos Canela	—N/a	WAPA-TV (Channel 4)	
2021	65th	Michelle Marie Colón Ramírez	Loíza	September 30, 2021	26	Centro de Bellas Artes Luis A. Ferré	San Juan	José Figueroa	Estefanía Soto	Bryan Villarini	Diane Ferrer	Yizette Cifredo, José Santana, and Neyra Alfonsina		Lunay, Fonseca, and Manuel Medrano	—N/a	WAPA-TV (Channel 4)	
2020	—N/a	Estefanía Natalia Soto Torres	San Sebastián	Due to the impact of the COVID-19 pandemic, Miss Universe Puerto Rico 2020 was not held. The first runner-up in Miss Universe Puerto Rico 2019, Estefanía Natalia Soto Torres from San Sebastián, was appointed and crowned as Miss Universe Puerto Rico 2020 on September 24, 2020.													
2019	64th	Madison Sara Anderson Berríos	Toa Baja	June 13, 2019	28	Centro de Bellas Artes Luis A. Ferré	San Juan	Jaime Mayol and Cynthia Olavarría		—N/a		Nicole Chacón, William Valdés, and Neyra Alfonsina		El Gran Combo, Jencarlos Canela, and Willy Rodríguez	—N/a	WAPA-TV (Channel 4)	
2018	63rd	Kiara Liz Ortega Delgado	Rincón	September 20, 2018	29	Centro de Bellas Artes Luis A. Ferré	San Juan	Jaime Mayol and Cynthia Olavarría		—N/a		Nicole Chacón, William Valdés, and Neyra Alfonsina		Mau y Ricky and Calma Carmona	List: Miss Universe 1985 Deborah Carthy Deu, Miss Universe 1993 Dayanara Torres, Miss Universe 2001 Denise Quiñones, and Miss Universe 2006 Zuleyka Rivera	WAPA-TV (Channel 4)	

=== Miss Universe Puerto Rico (2010–2017) ===
From 2010 to 2017, the television producer Luisito Vigoreaux and model agent Desiree Lowry held the Miss Universe franchise under the name of "Miss Universe Puerto Rico." Lowry also acted as national director.

Year	Ed.	Winner	Rep.	Date	Entrants	Venue	Location	Presenter(s)	Co-presenter(s)		Performer(s)	Special guest	Broadcaster	Ref(s)
Year	Ed.	Winner	Rep.	Date	Entrants	Venue	Location	Presenter(s)	Mezzanine	Backstage	Performer(s)	Special guest	Broadcaster	Ref(s)
2017	62nd	Danyeshka "Danna" Hernández Valentín	San Juan	May 4, 2017	40	Centro de Bellas Artes Luis A. Ferré	San Juan	Jaime Mayol	Desirée Lowry	Nicole Chacón	Gilberto Santa Rosa, Tommy Torres, Stevan Micheo, Francisco Paz and Adlan Cruz	—N/a	WAPA-TV (Channel 4)	
2016	61st	Brenda Azaria Jiménez Hernández	Aguadilla	November 12, 2015	40	Centro de Bellas Artes Luis A. Ferré	San Juan	Jaime Mayol	Natalia Rivera	Nicole Chacón, Yulianna Vargas, and Gil Marie López	Gente de Zona, Tito el Bambino, Pedro Capó, and Raúl Di Blasio	—N/a	WAPA-TV (Channel 4)	
2016	61st	Kristhielee Yinaira Caride Santiago (Note: The original winner Kristhielee Yinaira Caride Santiago was succeeded by the first runner-up Brenda Azaria Jiménez Hernández after her dethronement on March 17, 2016 due to failed press obligations.)	Isabela	November 12, 2015	40	Centro de Bellas Artes Luis A. Ferré	San Juan	Jaime Mayol	Natalia Rivera	Nicole Chacón, Yulianna Vargas, and Gil Marie López	Gente de Zona, Tito el Bambino, Pedro Capó, and Raúl Di Blasio	—N/a	WAPA-TV (Channel 4)	
2015	60th	Catalina Morales Gómez	Guaynabo	October 9, 2014	45	Complejo Ferial de Puerto Rico Juan H. Cintrón	Ponce	Raymond Arrieta	Alexandra Fuentes	—N/a	Andy Montañez, Chino & Nacho, Alexis & Fido, and Luis Enrique	—N/a	Telemundo (Channel 2)	
2014	59th	Gabriela Berríos Pagán	Toa Baja	October 3, 2013	28	Centro de Bellas Artes Luis A. Ferré	San Juan	Raymond Arrieta	Alexandra Fuentes	—N/a	Sie7e, Pedro Capó, La Secta AllStar, and Natanael	—N/a	Telemundo (Channel 2)	
2013	58th	Monic Marie Pérez Díaz	Arecibo	August 29, 2012	32	Centro de Bellas Artes Luis A. Ferré	San Juan	Raymond Arrieta	Alexandra Fuentes	—N/a	Luis Fonsi, R.K.M. & Ken Y, Zion & Lennox, Arcángel, El Lobo, Denise Quiñones, and Arthur Hanlon	—N/a	Telemundo (Channel 2)	
2012	57th	Bodine Koehler Peña	Río Grande	November 7, 2011	39	Centro de Bellas Artes Luis A. Ferré	San Juan	Raymond Arrieta	Alexandra Fuentes and Mariana Vicente	—N/a	Daddy Yankee, Christian Daniel, and Fanny Lu	—N/a	Telemundo (Channel 2)	
2011	56th	Viviana Ortiz Pastrana	Corozal	November 4, 2010	40	Centro de Convenciones de Puerto Rico	San Juan	Luisito Vigoreaux	Rashel Díaz and Cordelia González	—N/a	Gilberto Santa Rosa and Dyland & Lenny	—N/a	Telemundo (Channel 2)	
2010	55th	Mariana Paola Vicente Morales	Río Grande	November 12, 2009	39	Centro de Bellas Artes Luis A. Ferré	San Juan	Luisito Vigoreaux	Rashel Díaz and Zuleyka Rivera	—N/a	Jencarlos Canela and Víctor Manuelle	Miss Universe 2006 Zuleyka Rivera	Telemundo (Channel 2)	

=== Miss Puerto Rico Universe (2003–2009) ===
From 2003 to 2009, the beautician Magali Febles held the Miss Universe franchise under the name of "Miss Puerto Rico Universe." Febles also acted as national director.

Year	Ed.	Winner	Rep.	Date	Entrants	Venue	Location	Presenter(s)	Co-presenter(s)	Performer(s)	Special guest	Broadcaster	Ref(s)
2009	54th	Mayra Matos Pérez	Cabo Rojo	October 22, 2008	70	Coliseo José Miguel Agrelot	San Juan	Braulio Castillo Jr., Rodolfo Jiménez, and Zuleyka Rivera	—N/a	Ángel & Khriz, Reik, R.K.M & Key-Y and Ingrid Rivera	List: Miss Universe 2008 Dayana Mendoza and Miss Universe 2006 Zuleyka Rivera	WAPA-TV (Channel 4)	
2008	53rd	Ingrid Marie Rivera Santos	Dorado	November 23, 2007	30	Centro de Bellas Artes Luis A. Ferré	San Juan	Desiree Lowry and Osvaldo Ríos	—N/a	Kany Garcia, Ricardo Montaner, and Victoria's Magical Act	—N/a	Telemundo (Channel 2)	
2007	52nd	Wilmadilis "Uma" Blasini Pérez	Guayanilla	November 22, 2006	30	Centro de Convenciones de Puerto Rico	San Juan	Alexandra Malagón and Raymond Arrieta	—N/a	Zuleyka Rivera and R.K.M & Ken-Y	Miss Universe 2006 Zuleyka Rivera	Telemundo (Channel 2)	
2006	51st	Zuleyka Jerrís Rivera Mendoza	Salinas	November 10, 2005	28	Muelle Panamericano I	San Juan	Deborah Carthy-Deu	Brenda Liz Lopéz and Zoribel Fonalledas	Chayanne and Wisin & Yandel	Miss Universe 2005 Natalie Glebova	Telemundo (Channel 2)	
2005	50th	Cynthia Enid Olavarría Rivera	Salinas	October 14, 2004	30	Centro de Bellas Artes Luis A. Ferré	San Juan	Deborah Carthy-Deu and Eddie Miró	—N/a	Axel, Denise Quiñones, and Victor Manuelle	Miss Universe 2004 Jennifer Hawkins	Telemundo (Channel 2)	
2004	49th	Alba Giselle Reyes Santos	Cidra	October 10, 2003	40	Centro de Bellas Artes Luis A. Ferré	San Juan	Manolo Cardona and Mara Croatto	Carla Tricoli, Maria Del Carmen González and Amelia Vega	Cristian Castro	Miss Universe 2003 Amelia Vega	Telemundo (Channel 2)	
2003	48th	Carla Tricoli Rodríguez	Vieques	September 12, 2002	50	Centro de Bellas Artes Luis A. Ferré	San Juan	Rafael José	Denise Quiñones and Isis Casalduc	Carlos Ponce and José Feliciano	List: Miss Universe 2002 Oxana Fedorova and Miss Universe 1998 Wendy Fitzwilliam	WAPA-TV (Channel 4)	

=== Miss Puerto Rico Universe (1999–2002) ===
From 1999 to 2002, the TeleOnce television station held the Miss Universe franchise under the name of "Miss Puerto Rico Universe. Producer Francisco "Paquitín" Cordero and his wife, model agent Itza Cordero, acted as national directors.

Year	Ed.	Winner	Rep.	Date	Entrants	Venue	Location	Presenter(s)	Co-presenters(s)		Performer(s)	Special Guest	Broadcaster	Ref(s)
2002	47th	Isis Marie Casalduc González	Utuado	September 26, 2001	48	Centro de Bellas Artes Luis A. Ferré	San Juan	Braulio Castillo Jr.	Desiree Lowry	Nuria Sebazco	Denise Quiñones, La Secta AllStar, and Shalim	Miss Universe 2001 Denise Quiñones	TeleOnce (Channel 11)	
2001	46th	Denise Marie Quiñones August	Lares	November 14, 2000	63	Centro de Bellas Artes Luis A. Ferré	San Juan	Braulio Castillo Jr.	Desiree Lowry	Brenda Liz López	Grupo Manía and MDO	—N/a	TeleOnce (Channel 11)	
2000	45th	Zoraida Isabel "Zoribel" Fonalledas Ferraiouli	Guaynabo	November 4, 1999	49	Centro de Bellas Artes Luis A. Ferré	San Juan	Braulio Castillo Jr.	Desiree Lowry	Ana Rosa Brito	Pablo Montero	Miss Universe 1998 Wendy Fitzwilliam	TeleOnce (Channel 11)	
1999	44th	Brenda Liz López Ramos	Lares	November 11, 1998	44	Centro de Bellas Artes Luis A. Ferré	San Juan	Braulio Castillo Jr.	Desiree Lowry	Mara Croatto	Francisco Paz and Víctor Manuelle	Miss Universe 1998 Wendy Fitzwilliam	TeleOnce (Channel 11)	

=== Miss Universe Puerto Rico (1996–1998) ===
From 1996 to 1998, the Telemundo Puerto Rico television station held the Miss Universe franchise under the name of "Miss Universe Puerto Rico." Francisco "Paquitín" Cordero and his wife Itza Cordero acted as national directors.

Year	Ed.	Winner	Rep.	Date	Entrants	Venue	Location	Presenter(s)	Co-presenter(s)		Performer(s)	Special Guest	Broadcaster	Ref(s)
1998	43rd	Joyce Marie Giraud Mojica	Aguas Buenas	August 23, 1997	27	Teatro Braulio Castillo	Bayamón	Pedro Sevcec	Dagmar Rivera	Mara Croatto	Emilio Navaira and Ricardo Montaner	—N/a	Telemundo (Channel 2)	
1997	42nd	Ana Rosa Brito Suárez	San Juan	January 25, 1997	31	Teatro Yagüez	Mayagüez	Jorge Rivera Nieves	Desiree Lowry	Mara Croatto	Alberto Carrión and Luis Enrique	—N/a	Telemundo (Channel 2)	
1996	41st	Sarybel Velilla Cabeza	Toa Alta	January 27, 1996	43	Centro de Convenciones del Condado	San Juan	Jorge Rivera Nieves	Desiree Lowry	Carmen Batiz	Enrique Iglesias	Miss Universe 1995 Chelsi Smith	Telemundo (Channel 2)	

=== Miss Puerto Rico (1962–1995) ===
From 1962 to 1995, the model agent Anna Santisteban held the Miss Universe franchise under the name of "Miss Puerto Rico." Santisteban also acted as national director.

Year	Ed.	Winner	Rep. (Note: Municipality represented by the contestant who won the pageant, including the defunct municipalities of Santurce and Río Piedras. From 1952 to 1957, contestants represented municipalities or sponsors. From 1961 to 1972, contestants did not represent any entity, wearing only a number as a marker. For those contestants who did not represent municipalities, they have been assigned the municipality of birth and upbringing. In 1973, contestants began to permanently represent municipalities.)	Date	Entrants (Note: Number of contestants during the final night of the pageant. In 1952, the El Imparcial newspaper allowed the public to decide the top 10 semifinalists from 22 registered contestants who would compete on the final night of the pageant via voting slips published every day for two weeks. A week after the voting ended and the semifinalists were announced, the pageant was held. Only 8 of 10 contestants competed, as two withdrew before the final competition. In 1955, the public was allowed to vote but not semifinalists were chosen in advance, as all 26 registered contestants participated during the final night of the pageant. In 1957, the public was allowed to vote for the top 21 semifinalists from 32 registered contestants who would compete on the final night of the pageant. However, only 19 competed. In 1967, semifinalists for the final night of the pageant were chosen in smaller competitions divided by metropolitan areas in Puerto Rico: San Juan, Ponce, and Mayagüez. A panel of judges chose three final contestants from San Juan, while the contestants from the other two areas are unknown. In 1953, 1954, 1956, and 1961 to 1966, there was no public voting and no semifinalists were chosen in advance. All registered contestants (except for any who unexpectedly withdrew for any particular reason) participated during the final night of the pageant. Since 1966, this has been the case.)	Venue (Note: Name of venue when pageant was held.)	Location	Presenter(s)	Co-presenter(s)		Performer(s)	Special Guest	Broadcaster	Ref(s)
1995	40th	Desirée Louny Lowry Rodríguez	Corozal	August 6, 1994	54	Palacio de Recreación y Deportes	Mayagüez	Pedro Zervigón	Deborah Carthy Deu	Anna Santisteban	Rafael José and Chucho Avellanet	—N/a	Telemundo (Channel 2)	
1994	39th	Brenda Esther Robles Cortés (Note: Days before crowning her successor, it became public that Miss Puerto Rico 1994 Brenda Esther Robles Cortés was pregnant, which was a breach of contract. As a result, she did not crown her successor at Miss Puerto Rico 1995. Instead, Miss Puerto Rico 1984 and Miss Puerto Rico 1979 from Mayagüez, the host municipality of the pageant, performed the crowning.)	Isabela	August 21, 1993	42	Sala de Actividades del Centro Vacacional UIA	Loíza	Pedro Zervigón	Deborah Carthy Deu	Anna Santisteban	Raúl Ramírez and Danny Rivera	Miss Universe 1993 Dayanara Torres	Telemundo (Channel 2)	
1993	38th	Dayanara Torres Delgado	Toa Alta	July 17, 1992	39	Coliseo Rubén Rodríguez	Bayamón	Pedro Zervigón	Deborah Carthy Deu	Anna Santisteban	Ballet de Telemundo	List: Miss Universe 1992 Michelle McLean and Miss Universe 1970 Marisol Malaret	Telemundo (Channel 2)	
1992	37th	Daisy García Rodríguez	Bayamón	July 27, 1991	33	Teatro Municipal	Toa Alta	Pedro Zervigón	Deborah Carthy Deu	Anna Santisteban	List: Lizzette Bouret, George Cantín, Otilio Warrington, Trevor Richardson, and Alejandro Primero	—N/a	WAPA-TV (Channel 4)	
1991	36th	Lizzette Marie Bouret Echevarría	Toa Alta	July 21, 1990	35	Teatro La Perla	Ponce	Pedro Zervigón	Deborah Carthy Deu	Anna Santisteban	List: Chucho Avellanet, Perla del Sur, Zoraida Alonso, Juan Alberto, and Antonio Barasorda	—N/a	SuperSiete (Channel 7)	List
1990	35th	María Luisa Fortuño Cosimi	Guaynabo	July 22, 1989	44	International Ballroom in El San Juan Hotel & Casino	San Juan	Pedro Zervigón	Deborah Carthy Deu	Anna Santisteban	Proyecto M and Antonio Barasoda	Miss Universe 1986 Barbara Palacios	SuperSiete (Channel 7)	List
1989	34th	Carmen María Villar Ruiz	Salinas	July 23, 1988	46	International Ballroom in El San Juan Hotel & Casino	San Juan	Pedro Zervigón	Deborah Carthy Deu	Anna Santisteban	Perla del Sur and Charlie Masso	—N/a	SuperSiete (Channel 7)	List
1988	33rd	Isabel María Pardo Cubeñas	Guaynabo	August 1, 1987	43	International Ballroom in El San Juan Hotel & Casino	San Juan	Pedro Zervigón	Cecilia Bolocco	Anna Santisteban	José Tavárez	Miss Universe 1987 Cecilia Bolocco	SuperSiete (Channel 7)	List
1987	—N/a	Laurie Tamara Simpson Rivera	San Juan	Due to time restraints caused by the advance of the celebration of the Miss Universe international pageant from July to May, Miss Puerto Rico 1987 was not held. The second runner-up in Miss Puerto Rico 1986, Laurie Tamara Simpson from San Juan, was appointed and crowned as Miss Puerto Rico 1897 on April 21, 1987.										
1986	32nd	Elizabeth Robison Latalladi	San Germán	April 26, 1986	45	International Ballroom in El San Juan Hotel & Casino	San Juan	María Falcón and Edgardo Huertas	Marisol Malaret	Ana Santisteban	Ballet Concierto and Orvil Miller	List: Miss Puerto Rico 1985 Deborah Carthy Deu and Miss Universe 1970 Marisol Malaret	Teleluz (Channel 7)	List
1985	31st	Deborah Fátima Carthy Deu	San Juan	April 27, 1985	33	Parque Central	San Juan	Pedro Zervigón	María Falcón	Ana Santisteban	Freddy Escobar	—N/a	Teleluz (Channel 7)	List
1984	30th	Sandra Beauchamp Roche	Mayagüez	April 28, 1984	54	Mets Pavilion	Guaynabo	Pedro Zervigón	Carmen Jovet and Alfred D. Herger	Ana Santisteban	Freddy Escobar	—N/a	Teleluz (Channel 7)	List
1983	29th	Carmen Batiz Vergara	Trujillo Alto	April 23, 1983	38	Polideportivo	Carolina	Pedro Zervigón	—N/a	Ana Santisteban	Unknown	—N/a	Teleluz (Channel 7)	List
1982	28th	Lourdes Milagros Mantero Hormazábal	Juncos	April 24, 1982	46	Estadio Municipal	Juncos	Pedro Zervigón	Gilbert Mamery	Ana Santisteban	Danny Rivera	Miss Universe 1981 Irene Sáez	Teleluz (Channel 7)	List
1981	27th	Carmen Lotti Rodríguez	Guaynabo	May 2, 1981	44	Centro de Convenciones	San Germán	Pedro Zervigón	Gilbert Mamery	Ana Santisteban	Hugo Leonel Vaccaro and Ballet de Victor Huertas	—N/a	Telecadena Pérez Perry (Channel 11)	List
1980	26th	Agnes Tañón Correa	Caguas	May 17, 1980	37	Teatro La Perla	Ponce	Luis Vigoreaux	—N/a	Ana Santisteban	Irem Poventud and Rafael "Kaki" Torrens	—N/a	WAPA-TV (Channel 4)	List
1979	25th	Audrey Teresa "Tere" López Hernández	Mayagüez	May 3, 1979	46	Centro de Convenciones del Condado	San Juan	Luis Vigoreaux	Erik Estrada	Ana Santisteban	Ana María Castañón	—N/a	WAPA-TV (Channel 4)	List
1978	24th	Ada Cecille Perkins Flores	San Juan	April 22, 1978	51	Centro de Convenciones del Condado	San Juan	Luis Vigoreaux	—N/a	Ana Santisteban	Hugo Leonel Vaccaro	—N/a	WAPA-TV (Channel 4)	List
1977	23rd	Maria Del Mar Rivera Veglio	Ponce	April 23, 1977	34	Centro de Convenciones del Condado	San Juan	Luis Vigoreaux	—N/a	Ana Santisteban	Unknown	—N/a	WAPA-TV (Channel 4)	List
1976	22nd	Elizabeth Zayas Ortiz	Salinas	May 22, 1976	33	Teatro Cinema 4	Guaynabo	Luis Vigoreaux	Beba Franco	Ana Santisteban	Unknown	—N/a	WAPA-TV (Channel 4)	List
1975	21st	Lorell Del Carmen Carmona Juan	San Germán	May 3, 1975	25	Teatro Cinema 4	Guaynabo	Luis Vigoreaux	—N/a	Ana Santisteban	Unknown	—N/a	WAPA-TV (Channel 4)	List
1974	20th	Sonia María Stege Chardón	San Juan	June 22, 1974	29	Coliseo Roberto Clemente	San Juan	Luis Vigoreaux	—N/a	Ana Santisteban	Unknown	—N/a	WAPA-TV (Channel 4)	List
1973	19th	Gladys Vanessa Colón Díaz	Orocovis	May 26, 1973	47	Coliseo Roberto Clemente	San Juan	Luis Vigoreaux	—N/a	Ana Santisteban	Allegro 72, Tito Peña, and José Raúl Ramírez	—N/a	WAPA-TV (Channel 4)	List
1972	18th	Bárbara Idelisse Torres Viñolo	Santurce (Note: Barbara Idelisse Torres Viñolo was born in Santurce to parents native to Santurce.)	June 22, 1972	46	Grand Ballroom in San Jerónimo Hilton Hotel	San Juan	Axel Anderson	—N/a	Ana Santisteban	Danny Rivera	Miss Universe 1970 Marisol Malaret	Telemundo (Channel 2)	List
1971	17th	Idalia Margarita "Beba" Franco Cantino	Santurce (Note: Idalia Margarita "Beba" Franco Cantino was born in Santurce to a father born in Santurce and a mother born in Humacao. At the time of the pageant, she was a resident of Isla Verde district in Carolina. She competed with the band of "Candidata No. 15" (Candidate No. 15).)	June 17, 1971	37	Salón Principal in Flamboyán Hotel & Casino	San Juan	Luis Vigoreux	—N/a	Ana Santisteban	Oscar Solo	Miss Universe 1970 Marisol Malaret	WAPA-TV (Channel 4)	List
1970	16th	Marisol Malaret Contreras	Santurce (Note: Marisol Malaret Contreras was born in Utuado to a father native to Utuado and a mother native to San Juan. She was raised in Santurce.)	June 21, 1970	12	Grand Ballroom in Puerto Rico-Sheraton Hotel	San Juan	Unknown				—N/a	—N/a	List
1969	15th	Aida "Aidita" Concepción Betancourt Barreto	Santurce (Note: Aida "Aidita" Concepción Betancourt Barreto was born and raised in Santurce.)	June 16, 1969	17	Hunca Munca Room in El San Juan Hotel	San Juan	Unknown				—N/a	—N/a	List
1968	14th	Marylene Carrasquillo Toro	Río Piedras (Note: Marylene Carrasquillo Toro was born in Baltimore, Maryland, but she was raised in Río Piedras to a father native to Gurabo and a mother native to San Germán.)	June 26, 1968	12	Hunca Munca Room in El San Juan Hotel	San Juan	Unknown				—N/a	—N/a	List
1967	13th	Ivonne Coll Mendoza	Fajardo (Note: Ivonne Coll Mendoza was born and raised in Fajardo to parents native to Fajardo.)	July 1, 1967	>3 (Note: During the final night of the pageant, 3 contestants from the San Juan metropolitan area participated alongside an unknown number of contestants from two other metropolitan areas, namely Ponce and Mayagüez.)	Club La Copa Supper in Americana Hotel	San Juan	Unknown				—N/a	WAPA-TV (Channel 4) and Tele-San Juan (Channel 18)	List
1966	12th	Carol Bajandas (Note: Miss Puerto Rico 1966 Carol Bajandas moved to California to pursue acting. As a result, she did not crown her successor at Miss Puerto Rico 1967. Instead, Miss Puerto Rico 1965 performed the crowning.)	Santurce (Note: Carol Bajandas was born and raised in Santurce.)	May 29, 1966	8	Grand Ballroom in San Jerónimo Hilton Hotel	San Juan	Unknown				—N/a	—N/a	List
1965	11th	Gloria Mercedes Cobián Díaz	San Juan (Note: Gloria Mercedes Cobián Díaz was born and raised in San Juan by parents native to Bayamón.)	June 27, 1965	10	Grand Ballroom in San Jerónimo Hilton Hotel	San Juan	Unknown				—N/a	—N/a	List
1964	10th	Yolanda Rodríguez Machín	Trujillo Alto (Note: Yolanda Rodríguez Machín was born and raised in Trujillo Alto. At the time of the pageant, she had lived in Río Piedras for 12 years. Before joining the Miss Puerto Rico competition for Miss Universe, she briefly competed at the concurrent Miss Puerto Rico competition for Miss International as "Miss Odontología," a title bestowed by her sponsor, which was the academic division where she was studying at the University of Puerto Rico, Escuela de Odontología (School of Dentistry).)	July 16, 1964	7	Salón Primavera in Holiday Inn Hotel	San Juan	Unknown				—N/a	—N/a	List
1963	9th	Jeanette Biascoechea Rodríguez	San Juan (Note: Jeanette Biascoechea Rodríguez was born in San Juan to parents native to San Juan.)	June 19, 1963	7	"Una Hora Contigo" WAPA-TV studio	San Juan	Unknown				—N/a	WAPA-TV (Channel 4)	List
1962	8th	Ana Celia Sosa Arce	Santurce (Note: Ana Celia Sosa Arce was born in Santurce to parents native to Isabela. She was raised in the Bronx, New York City.)	June 27, 1962	10	Club La Concha in La Concha Hotel	San Juan	Raúl Delgado Cué and Irma Delgado	—N/a	—N/a	Unknown	—N/a	WAPA-TV (Channel 4)	List

=== Miss Puerto Rico (1961) ===
In 1961, the Puerto Rican League Against Cancer held Miss Universe franchise under the name of "Miss Puerto Rico." Tony Beacon acted as director of the pageant, while Anna Santisteban acted as trainer of the contestants.

Year	Ed.	Winner	Rep.	Date	Entrants	Venue	Location	Presenter(s)	Co-presenter(s)	Performer(s)	Special Guest	Broadcaster	Ref(s)
1961	7th	María Enid "Enid" del Valle Pérez	Aguadilla (Note: María Enid "Enid" del Valle Pérez was born and raised in Aguadilla.)	June 12, 1961	7	Club Caribe in Caribe Hilton Hotel	San Juan	Tony Beacon	—N/a	Unknown	—N/a	—N/a	

=== None (1958–1960) ===
From 1958 to 1960, the Miss Universe franchise remained unclaimed in Puerto Rico. As a result, no editions were held.

Year	Ed.	Winner	Rep.	Date	Entrants	Venue	Location	Presenter(s)	Co-presenter(s)	Performer(s)	Special Guest	Broadcaster	Ref(s)
1960	Due to the Miss Universe franchise being unclaimed in Puerto Rico, no editions were held from 1958 to 1960.												
1959	Due to the Miss Universe franchise being unclaimed in Puerto Rico, no editions were held from 1958 to 1960.												
1958	Due to the Miss Universe franchise being unclaimed in Puerto Rico, no editions were held from 1958 to 1960.												

=== Miss El Imparcial (1957) ===
In 1957, the El Imparcial newspaper held the Miss Universe franchise under the name of "Miss El Imparcial." Miguel Angel Yumet acted as national director.

Year	Ed.	Winner	Rep.	Date	Entrants	Venue	Location	Presenter(s)	Co-presenter(s)	Performer(s)	Special Guest	Broadcaster	Ref(s)
1957	6th	María del Pilar "Mapita" Mercado Cordero	San Juan (Note: María del Pilar "Mapita" Mercado Cordero represented San Juan, wearing the band of "San Juan" in 1957. From 1961 to 1973, the pageant used numbers, not municipalities or sponsors, as makers for the candidates. In 1973, the pageant began to only use municipalities as markers for the candidates.)	June 16, 1957	19	Salón Lira in Escambrón Beach Club & Hotel	San Juan	Miguel Angel Yumet	Rafael Beliza	Domingo Zaiter, Arthur Murray Studios, José Luis Moneró, Carmen Delia Dipini, Sonia Marrero, Gloria Colón, Cuadritos, Hermanitas Ocasio and Sylvia Colón Dance Academy	—N/a	WAPA-TV (Channel 4) (Note: During the pageant, the candidates were presented on WAPA-TV on a 15-minute television program called "Seleccionando La Señorita El Imparcial." However, WAPA-TV did not broadcast the final competition.)	List

=== Miss Puerto Rico Beauty (1956) ===
In 1956, the Puerto Rico Psychopedagogical Institute held the Miss Universe franchise under the name of "Miss Puerto Rico Beauty." Miguel Angel Yumet acted as national director.

Year	Ed.	Winner	Rep.	Date	Entrants	Venue	Location	Presenter(s)	Co-presenter(s)	Performer(s)	Special Guest	Broadcaster	Ref(s)
1956	5th	Francisca "Paquita" Vivó Colón	San Juan (Note: Francisca "Paquita" Vivó Colón was born and raised in San Juan to a father native to Utuado and a mother native to Las Piedras.)	June 24, 1956	6	Salón Lira in Escambrón Beach Club	San Juan	Miguel Angel Yumet	—N/a	—N/a	—N/a	—N/a	List

=== Miss El Imparcial (1953–1955) ===
From 1953 to 1955, the El Imparcial newspaper held the Miss Universe franchise under the name of "Miss El Imparcial." Miguel Angel Yumet acted as national director.

Year	Ed.	Winner	Rep.	Date	Entrants	Venue	Location	Presenter(s)	Co-presenter(s)	Performer(s)	Special Guest	Broadcaster	Ref(s)
1955	4th	Carmen Laura Betancourt Burgos	Trujillo Alto (Note: Carmen Laura Betancourt Burgos was born and raised in Trujillo Alto, but competed with the band of "Miss Halo," a title bestowed by her employer and sponsor, Colgate Palmolive Co.)	June 26, 1955	26	Salón Lira in Escambrón Beach Club & Hotel	San Juan	Miguel Angel Yumet	—N/a	Juan Luis Barry, Skippy, Dorita Ortiz, and Martín Vargas	—N/a	WAPA-TV (Channel 4)	List
1954	3rd	Luz Belinda "Lucy" Santiago Nazario	Santurce (Note: Luz Belinda "Lucy" Santiago Nazario was born in Ponce, but she was raised in Santurce. Both of her parents were native to Ponce. She competed with the band of "Santurce.")	June 27, 1954	24	Teatro Tapia	San Juan	José Luis Terregrosa	—N/a	Arturo Somohano, Melody Maids, Bobby Capó, Avelino Muñoz, and Ruchi Álvarez	—N/a	—N/a	List
1953	2nd	Wanda Irizarry Antonmattei	Río Piedras (Note: Wanda Irizarry Antonmattei was born and raised in Río Piedras to a father native to Cabo Rojo and a mother native to Humacao. She competed with the band of "Río Piedras.")	May 15, 1953 (Note: The final competition of the pageant was held on May 25, 1953. However, the winner was officially crowned in a dance ball celebrated at the non-extant Jack’s Club & Hotel (present location of Holiday Garden Inn in Condado) on June 26, 1953.)	12	Salón Fiesta in Condado Beach Hotel	San Juan	Miguel Angel Yumet	—N/a	Eugenio Iglesias	—N/a	—N/a	List

=== Miss Borinquen (1952) ===
In 1952, Weldon Farms, producers of Leche Alba (Milk Alba), and the El Imparcial newspaper held the Miss Universe franchise under the name of "Miss Borinquen." Miguel Angel Yumet acted as national director.

Year	Ed.	Winner	Rep.	Date	Entrants	Venue	Location	Presenter(s)	Co-presenter(s)	Performer(s)	Special Guest	Broadcaster	Ref(s)
1952	1st	María Ileana "Marilia" Levy Bernal	Lares (Note: María Ileana "Marilia" Levy Bernal was born and raised in Lares to parents native to Lares.)	May 25, 1952	8	Salón Fiesta in Condado Beach Hotel	San Juan	Miguel Angel Yumet	—N/a	Conchita Piquer	—N/a	—N/a	List

== Runners-up and awardees ==
This list includes the winner, runners-up, and main special awardees (with their municipalities) of Miss Universe Puerto Rico in ascending order from the inaugural edition of the pageant in 1952 to the present. They are divided by the franchise holder under which they participated.

=== Miss Universe Puerto Rico (2018–present) ===
Since 2018, the Hemisphere Media Group media conglomerate holds the Miss Universe franchise under the name of "Miss Universe Puerto Rico." It manages the franchise under its subsidiary WAPA-TV. Denise Quiñones acted as national director from 2018 to 2021, when Yizette Cifredo took over the role.

Year	Ed.	Winner (1st place)	1st runner-up (2nd place)	2nd runner-up (3rd place)	3rd runner-up (4th place)	4th runner-up (5th place)	5th runner-up (6th place)	Miss Photogenic	Miss Congeniality	Ref(s)
2026	70th	Jennifer Barreto (née Abreu Mora); San Sebastián	Génesis María Dávila Pérez; Arroyo	Viviane Díaz Arroyo; Aguas Buenas	Nicole Marie Colón Rivera; Aibonito	Chelsey Mary García Agrón; Añasco	—N/a	Vivianie Díaz Arroyo; Aguas Buenas	Andrea Nathaly Zerpa Contreras; Toa Alta	
2025	69th	Zashely Nicole Alicea Rivera; Dorado	Samarys Barbot Arroyo; Jayuya	Isys Arimar Santos Crespo; Vieques	Marisabel Rivera Negrón; Ponce	Aneichka Maldonado Torres; Canóvanas	—N/a	Isys Arimar Santos Crespo; Vieques	Heidi Marie Acevedo Rosario; Morovis	
2024	68th	Jennifer Colón Alvarado; Orocovis	Orlanis Naomí Rivera Rivera; Corozal	Carolina Mía Gómez Cumba; Salinas	Ivana Carolina Irizarry Fritany; Lares	Stephanie Ríos Vélez; Toa Alta	—N/a	Stephanie Ríos Vélez; Toa Alta	Angelisse Marie Lucena Nazario; Añasco	
2023	67th	Karla Inelisse Guilfú Acevedo; Patillas	Xarimar Acevedo Pabón; Río Grande	Kiara Rivera Escudero; Toa Baja	Fiorella Medina Pérez; Isabela	Isarel Marielis Román Almeda; San Lorenzo	—N/a	Gina Lee Garcia Colón; Cataño	Karina Rivera Camacho; Lajas	
2022	66th	Ashley Ann Cariño Barreto; Fajardo	Leonela González De Jesús; Dorado	Camille Fabery Diana; Cataño	Top 5 (4th and 5th place) (Note: Finished in the Top 5/Top 6 without a runner-up title. Finalists are alphabetically ordered based on the municipality they represented.)		—N/a	Annelise Torres Colón; Isabela	Ariana Hernández Colón; Mayagüez	
2022	66th	Ashley Ann Cariño Barreto; Fajardo	Leonela González De Jesús; Dorado	Camille Fabery Diana; Cataño	Graciela Berrios Barreto; Aguadilla	Valeria Pagán Masini; Toa Alta	—N/a	Annelise Torres Colón; Isabela	Ariana Hernández Colón; Mayagüez	
2021	65th	Michelle Marie Colón Ramírez; Loíza	Jaylene Marie Álvarez Del Valle; San Lorenzo	Oxana Isabel Rivera Álvarez; Dorado	Top 6 (4th, 5th, and 6th place)			Marangelí Meléndez Morales; Cidra	Karina Sarieh von Gundlach Pomales; Cayey	
2021	65th	Michelle Marie Colón Ramírez; Loíza	Jaylene Marie Álvarez Del Valle; San Lorenzo	Oxana Isabel Rivera Álvarez; Dorado	Heilymar Rosario Velázquez; Toa Baja	Sthephanie Marie Miranda Morales; Trujillo Alto	Gabriela Guzmán Guzmán; Villalba	Marangelí Meléndez Morales; Cidra	Karina Sarieh von Gundlach Pomales; Cayey	
2020	—N/a	Estefanía Natalia Soto Torres; San Sebastián	Due to the impact of the COVID-19 pandemic, Miss Universe Puerto Rico 2020 was not held. The first runner-up in Miss Universe Puerto Rico 2019, Estefanía Natalia Soto Torres from San Sebastián, was appointed and crowned as Miss Universe Puerto Rico 2020 on September 24, 2020.							
2019	64th	Madison Sara Anderson Berríos; Toa Baja	Estefanía Natalia Soto Torres; San Sebastián	Fabiola Krystal Valentín González; Camuy	Top 6 (4th, 5th, and 6th place)			Zorelys Lisboa Leandry; Hatillo	Bianka Loriel Torres Espada; Culebra	
2019	64th	Madison Sara Anderson Berríos; Toa Baja	Estefanía Natalia Soto Torres; San Sebastián	Fabiola Krystal Valentín González; Camuy	Tanya Marie Romero Álamo; Carolina	Verónica Montano Colón; Cayey	Rebeca Valentín García; Dorado	Zorelys Lisboa Leandry; Hatillo	Bianka Loriel Torres Espada; Culebra	
2018	63rd	Kiara Liz Ortega Delgado; Rincón	Alejandra Pagán Crespo; Vega Baja	Alexandra Porrata Montalvo; Ponce	Top 6 (4th, 5th, and 6th place)			Mariel Socorro Ocasio; Quebradillas	Ana Sofía Marti Pineda; Ciales	
2018	63rd	Kiara Liz Ortega Delgado; Rincón	Alejandra Pagán Crespo; Vega Baja	Alexandra Porrata Montalvo; Ponce	Yuanilie Alvarado González; Arecibo	Keyshla Maisonet; Dorado	Larissa Santiago Escazo; Fajardo	Mariel Socorro Ocasio; Quebradillas	Ana Sofía Marti Pineda; Ciales	

=== Miss Universe Puerto Rico (2010–2017) ===
From 2010 to 2017, the television producer Luisito Vigoreaux and model agent Desiree Lowry held the Miss Universe franchise under the name of "Miss Universe Puerto Rico." Lowry also acted as national director.

Year	Ed.	Winner (1st place)	1st runner-up (2nd place)	2nd runner-up (3rd place)	3rd runner-up (4th place)	4th runner-up (5th place)	5th runner-up (6th place)	Miss Photogenic	Miss Congeniality	Ref(s)
2017	62nd	Danyeshka "Danna" Hernández Valentín; San Juan	Jailenne Rivera Rodríguez Ponce	Kímberly Marie Jiménez Rodríguez; Dorado	Gretchen Colón Morales; Aibonito	Ivana Carolina Irizarry Fritany; Río Grande	—N/a	Layla Nicole Velázquez Rivera; Peñuelas	Nilda Omara Mercado Rosario; Lajas	
2016	61st	Kristhielee Yinaira Caride Santiago; Isabela	Brenda Azaria Jiménez Hernández; Aguadilla	Heilymar Rosario Velázquez; San Juan	Laihany Pontón Ortiz; Bayamón	Yamillette Rivera Ledée; Guayama	Stephanie Román De León; Dorado	Laihany Pontón Ortiz; Bayamón	Adriana Cuesta Amado; Aibonito	
2015	60th	Catalina Morales Gómez; Guaynabo	Nivializ Pérez Hernández; Aguas Buenas	Nicole Marie Colón Rivera; Cayey	Stephanie Cruz; Humacao	Alina Teresa Román Hubers; Mayagüez	Brenda Paola Hernández Santiago; Utuado	Nivializ Pérez Hernández; Aguas Buenas	Elinnette Rodríguez Calderín; Yauco	
2014	59th	Gabriela Berríos Pagán; Toa Baja	Aleyda Enid Ortiz Rodríguez; Bayamón	Stephanie Soto Ríos; Añasco	Alexandra Porrata Montalvo; Juana Díaz	Patricia Quiñones Negrón; Cayey	Larissa Santiago Escazo; Río Grande	Stephanie Soto Ríos; Añasco	María Isabel Vélez González; Camuy	
2013	58th	Monic Marie Pérez Díaz; Arecibo	Génesis María Dávila Pérez; Arroyo	Desirée Del Río De Jesús; Cayey	Cristina María Franceschini; Mayagüez	Amanda Ortiz Rosado; Orocovis	—N/a	Monic Pérez Díaz; Arecibo	Yubelkis Inocencia Paredes Valdez; Trujillo Alto	
2012	57th	Bodine Koehler Peña; Río Grande	Vanessa De Roide Toledo; Carolina	Gabriela Berríos Pagán; Toa Alta	Jennifer Guevara Campos; Arroyo	Nadyalee Torres López; Aguas Buenas	Shaleyka Cristine Vélez Avilés; Aguada	Nadyalee Torres López; Aguas Buenas	Raiza González Montes; Morovis	
2011	56th	Viviana Ortiz Pastrana; Corozal	Stephanie Román De León; Bayamón	Jessica Joan Santiago Rodríguez; Gurabo	Desirée Del Río De Jesús; Ciales	Ashley Beth Pérez Calderón; Humacao	—N/a	Paola Giselle Santiago Serrano; Aguadilla	Carolina Rodríguez Ruiz; Cabo Rojo	
2010	55th	Mariana Paola Vicente Morales; Río Grande	Ariana Rodríguez Fernández; Carolina	Aideliz Hidalgo Betances; Cayey	Yeidy Enid Bosques Pérez; Mayagüez	Coral Del Mar Casanova Calcerrada; Hatillo	—N/a	Chanty Vargas Meléndez; San Juan	Juanita Acosta Taveras; Toa Alta	

=== Miss Puerto Rico Universe (2003–2009) ===
From 2003 to 2009, the beautician Magali Febles held the Miss Universe franchise under the name of "Miss Puerto Rico Universe." Febles also acted as national director.

Year	Ed.	Winner (1st place)	1st runner-up (2nd place)	2nd runner-up (3rd place)	3rd runner-up (4th place)	4th runner-up (5th place)	5th runner-up (6th place)	Miss Photogenic	Miss Congeniality	Ref(s)
2009	54th	Mayra Matos Pérez; Cabo Rojo	Jennifer Colón Alvarado; San Juan	Sharon Haydee Gómez González; Santurce	Haydil Rivera Escobales; Adjuntas	Agnes Eileen Benítez Santiago; Cataño	Eydiebel Pérez Méndez; Vega Baja	Jeann-Marie Maldonado Cintrón; Hatillo	Elia Enid Colón; Río Piedras	
2008	53rd	Ingrid Marie Rivera Santos; Dorado	Claudia Cruz; Santurce	Kristina Ruisánchez Zayastorres; Trujillo Alto	Maribel Montalvo; Utuado	Amanda Díaz Torres; Isabela	Ivelisse Del Valle; Bayamón	Ingrid Marie Rivera Santos; Dorado	Letty Joan Pérez Rivera; Canóvanas	
2007	52nd	Wilmadilis "Uma" Blasini Pérez; Guayanilla	Sofía Álvarez; Coamo	Yara Liz Lasanta Santiago; Barranquitas	Amanda Raquel Soto; Patillas	Veronica Santiago; San Germán	María De Lourdes Díaz; Santurce	Veronica Santiago; San Germán	María De Lourdes Díaz; Santurce	
2006	51st	Zuleyka Jerrís Rivera Mendoza; Salinas	Lorenia Delgado Pacheco; Yauco	Marylin Bartolomei Balay; Ponce	Tanya Huntley; Río Piedras	Lizmary Nazario Irizarry; Lajas	Vanesa Figueroa; Dorado	Unknown	Unknown	
2005	50th	Cynthia Enid Olavarría Rivera; Salinas	Mónica Liz Candelaria Pou; Coamo	Neysha Pérez Feliciano; Guaynabo	Wailani Córdova Lacén; Loíza	Yara Liz Lasanta Santiago; Barranquitas	Wilmadilis "Uma" Blasini Pérez; San Juan	Unknown	Marisol Rodríguez; Corozal	
2004	49th	Alba Giselle Reyes Santos; Cidra	Paulette Arias; Villalba	Shanira Blanco Colón; Carolina	Cassandra Castro Holland; Fajardo	Antoinette Castrillo; San Juan	Norelis Ortiz Acosta; Toa Baja	Marianely Agosto; Naguabo	Unknown	
2003	48th	Carla Tricoli Rodríguez; Vieques	Cynthia Enid Olavarría Rivera; San Juan	Marcela Cortés; Barranquitas	Top 6 (4th, 5th, and 6th place)			Unknown	Unknown	
2003	48th	Carla Tricoli Rodríguez; Vieques	Cynthia Enid Olavarría Rivera; San Juan	Marcela Cortés; Barranquitas	Windy Suil Pagán; Dorado	Mariana Figueroa; Ponce	Deidre Rodríguez; Santa Isabel	Unknown	Unknown	

=== Miss Puerto Rico Universe (1999–2002) ===
From 1999 to 2002, the TeleOnce television station held the Miss Universe franchise under the name of "Miss Puerto Rico Universe. Producer Francisco "Paquitín" Cordero and his wife, model agent Itza Cordero, acted as national directors.

Year	Ed.	Winner (1st place)	1st runner-up (2nd place)	2nd runner-up (3rd place)	Top 5 (4th and 5th place)		Miss Photogenic	Miss Congeniality	Ref(s)
2002	47th	Isis Marie Casalduc González; Utuado	Griselle Santos Sosa; San Lorenzo	Nilda Gisela Santiago; Santa Isabel	Mónica Liz Candelaria Pou; Bayamón	Karla Carrión Maceira; Morovis	Yodaris Padró; Las Piedras	Noranys Febres Salicrup; Canóvanas	
2001	46th	Denise Marie Quiñones August; Lares	Johanna Marie Treviño Cuadrado; Añasco	Katherine González; Guayama	Raquel Zaragoza; Carolina	Marie Tere Benes; Ceiba	Tasha Cancio; Yauco	Victoria Marín; Maricao	
2000	45th	Zoraida Isabel "Zoribel" Fonalledas Ferraiouli; Guaynabo	Maria del Mar Rodríguez; Ponce	Bairá Soto Toledo; Utuado	Jackelyn García; Cataño	Bárbara Serrano Negrón; Naranjito	Zoraida Isabel "Zoribel" Fonalledas Ferraiouli; Guaynabo	Michelle Deliz; San Garmán	
1999	44th	Brenda Liz López Ramos; Lares	Miredys Peguero; Isabela	Brenda Lee Quiñones Pagán; Caguas	Haydee Rosario La Torre; Dorado	Maricel Ocasio; Ponce	Miredys Peguero; Isabela	Sara Luz Alvarado; Ciales	

=== Miss Universe Puerto Rico (1996–1998) ===
From 1996 to 1998, the Telemundo Puerto Rico television station held the Miss Universe franchise under the name of "Miss Universe Puerto Rico." Francisco "Paquitín" Cordero and his wife Itza Cordero acted as national directors.

Year	Ed.	Winner (1st place)	1st runner-up (2nd place)	2nd runner-up (3rd place)	Top 6 (4th, 5th, and 6th place)			Miss Photogenic	Miss Congeniality	Ref(s)
1998	43rd	Joyce Marie Giraud Mojica; Aguas Buenas	Dinah Carrión; Mayagüez	Haylis Córdova; Bayamón	Daphne Ramnath; Caguas	Jasmin Ortiz; Guaynabo	Antonia Alfonso; Juana Díaz	—N/a	Vanessa Montalvo; San Juan	
1997	42nd	Ana Rosa Brito Suárez; San Juan	Brenda Liz López Ramos; Lares	Olga García; Guaynabo	Greysa Amezaga; Fajardo	Lisaura Quiñones; Manatí	Betzaida Torres; Trujillo Alto	Ana Rosa Brito Suárez; San Juan	Jovanka Ramos Marcano; Río Grande	
1996	41st	Sarybel Velilla Cabeza; Toa Alta	Lillian Sein Martorell; Rincón	Olga Cesto; Bayamón	Blanca Sáez; Aibonito	Patricia Hayes; Dorado	Maribel Rosario; Mayagüez	Blanca Sáez; Aibonito	Aida Rivera; Fajardo	

=== Miss Puerto Rico (1962–1995) ===
From 1962 to 1995, the model agent Anna Santisteban held the Miss Universe franchise under the name of "Miss Puerto Rico." Santisteban also acted as national director.

Year	Ed.	Winner (1st place)	1st runner-up (2nd place)	2nd runner-up (3rd place)	3rd runner-up (4th place)	4th runner-up (5th place)	Miss Photogenic	Miss Congeniality	Ref(s)
1995	40th	Desirée Louny Lowry Rodríguez; Corozal	Alice Lee; Utuado	Michelle Moringlane; Santurce	Brenda Negrón; Ponce	Blanca Sáez; Aibonito	Desirée Louny Lowry Rodríguez; Corozal	Lydia Antonieta Pérez Lebrón; Lares	
1994	39th	Brenda Esther Robles Cortés; Isabela	Sonia Torres; Luquillo	Carmen Leila Díaz; Caguas	Nashali Enchautegui; Aguadilla	Maricely Berrios; Villalba	Lourdes Calderón Loíza	Janira Soto Vega; Bayamón	
1993	38th	Dayanara Torres Delgado; Toa Alta	Lianabel Rosario; Trujillo Alto	Damaris Cortes; Isabela	Mabel Vélez; San Juan	Lourdes Santiago; Lares	Lianabel Rosario; Trujillo Alto	Johanna Bobyn; Salinas	
1992	37th	Daisy García Rodríguez; Bayamón	Johanna Berenice Irizarry; Lajas	Lisaura Quiñones; Toa Alta	Linette Cordero; Dorado	Ileana Somarie Pino; Humacao	Denise Noriega; Río Grande	Rosario Ayala Babilonia Arecibo	
1991	36th	Lizzette Marie Bouret Echevarría; Toa Alta	María del Pilar Rivera; Lares	Ana Rosa Brito Suárez; San Juan	Zulma Cordero; Carolina	Raquel Ramos Padilla; Guaynabo	Dalisa Villalobos; Morovis	Jaqueline Pérez; Luquillo	
1990	35th	María Luisa Fortuño Cosimi; Guaynabo	Tania Collazo Barreiro; Orocovis	Leslie Torres; Gurabo	Michelle Torres; Toa Alta	Elba Morales; Lares	Tania Collazo; Orocovis	Kimberly Cupp; Canóvanas	
1989	34th	Carmen María Villar Ruiz; Salinas	Marlene O’Reilly; Guaynabo	Adelaida Núñez Vázquez; Cayey	Sandra Lugo; San Germán	Iris Lizelba Acosta Loíza	Sandra Lugo; San Germán	Linora Lozano; Ceiba	
1988	33rd	Isabel María Pardo Cubeñas; Guaynabo	Lucy Lawton; Carolina	Magadalena Pabón; Quebradillas	Yolanda Martínez; Trujillo Alto	Gisela Asencio; San Germán	Lucy Lawton; Carolina	Elizabeth Fuentes; Aguas Buenas	
1987	—N/a	Laurie Tamara Simpson Rivera; San Juan	Due to time restraints caused by the advance of the celebration of the Miss Universe international pageant from July to May, Miss Puerto Rico 1987 was not held. The second runner-up in Miss Puerto Rico 1986, Laurie Tamara Simpson from San Juan, was appointed and crowned as Miss Puerto Rico 1897 on April 21, 1987.						
1986	32nd	Elizabeth Robison Latalladi; San Germán	Ellen Santiago; Mayagüez	Laurie Tamara Simpson Rivera; San Juan	Teresa Montes; Aibonito	Wyneska Méndez; Fajardo	Elizabeth Robison Latalladi; San Germán	Ivelisse Pérez Guayanilla	
1985	31st	Deborah Fátima Carthy Deu; San Juan	Arlene Ramírez Román; San Germán	Marisol Rodríguez; Guaynabo	Grace Monge; Trujillo Alto	Sandra Brignoni; Toa Baja	Sandra Brignoni; Toa Baja	Marisol Rodríguez; Guaynabo	
1984	30th	Sandra Beauchamp Roche; Mayagüez	Linda Lee Tasch; Guaynabo	Iris Marie Soto; Cayey	Jeannette Sánchez; Toa Baja	Zaida Negron Cacho; Cataño	Unknown	Unknown	
1983	29th	Carmen Batiz Vergara; Trujillo Alto	María Rosa Silva; San Juan	Carlene Jiménez; Caguas	María Oliveras; Humacao	Zoraida Buxó; Guaynabo	Unknown	Unknown	
1982	28th	Lourdes Milagros Mantero Hormazábal; Juncos	Cinthia González; Orocovis	Mary Ann Cortés; Carolina	Susana Sánchez; Guaynabo	Lissette Santiago; San Juan	Unknown	Unknown	
1981	27th	Carmen Lotti Rodríguez; Guaynabo	Norma Copeland Bayamón	Lourdes Buxó; Ponce	Noelia Torres; Lares	Martha Font; San Juan	Norma Copeland Bayamón	Marisol Rosado; Rincón	
1980	26th	Agnes Tañón Correa; Caguas	Patricia Mercado; Mayagüez	Pilar Arbex; San Juan	Mariposa Zayas; Ponce	Brenda Lee Añasco	Patricia Mercado; Mayagüez	Unknown	
1979	25th	Audrey Teresa "Tere" López Hernández; Mayagüez	Irmgard Stiehl; San Juan	Roxane Bueso; Hatillo	Annie Lugo; San Germán	Mayra Merced O’Neill; Guaynabo	Unknown	Unknown	
1978	24th	Ada Cecille Perkins Flores; San Juan	Ida Regina Martínez; Lajas	Dorelee Fogelman; Guaynabo	Marie Renom de la Baume; Cabo Rojo	Eda Ortiz; Sabana Grande	María Soledad Baerga; Carolina	Elizabeth Ortiz; San Sebastián	
1977	23rd	Maria Del Mar Rivera Veglio; Ponce	María Teresa Fernández Power; San Juan	Norma Vega; Manatí	Marta Baker; Trujillo Alto	Blanca Valentín; Bayamón	Maria Del Mar Rivera Veglio; Ponce	Unknown	
1976	22nd	Elizabeth Zayas Ortiz; Salinas	Maritza Sanz Bayamón	Lourdes Ortiz Carro; Ponce	Jeanette Betancourt Caguas	Nancy Rivera Guayanilla	Elizabeth Zayas Ortiz; Salinas	Lillian Cintrón; Toa Alta	
1975	21st	Lorell Del Carmen Carmona Juan; San Germán	Unknown						
1974	20th	Sonia María Stege Chardón; San Juan	Águeda Arroyo Arecibo	Maritza Motta Añasco	Irma Luz Rosado Loíza	Marie Jane Rodríguez; Toa Baja	Ingrid Lanza; Carolina	Unknown	
1973	19th	Gladys Vanessa Colón Díaz; Orocovis	Saadia Asenjo Zacarías; Mayagüez	Lizzie Fonfrias; Carolina	Milagros Del Carmen García; Aibonito	Maria De Los Angeles Zayas; Ponce	Gladys Vanessa Colón Díaz; Orocovis	Ana Teresa Negrón; Guaynabo	
1972	18th	Bárbara Idelisse Torres Viñolo; Santurce	Adlín Johnson Morales; San Juan	Ivonne Piazza de la Luz; Adjuntas	Ana Nisi Goyco Graziani; Ponce	Odette Bouret Guillermety; Santurce	Judith Elizabeth Cintrón; Unknown	Carmencita González; Unknown	
1971	17th	Idalia Margarita "Beba" Franco Cantino; Santurce	Miriam López Piñeiro; Río Piedras	Mary Grace “Chi Chi” Riolo; Río Piedras	Ángela Caldas; Santurce	Carmen Medina; Santurce	Unknown	Lucy Prieto; Santurce	
1970	16th	Marisol Malaret Contreras; Santurce	Ivonne "Ivy" Menéndez Conde; San Juan	Sonia Ivette Muñiz; Unknown	—N/a	—N/a	—N/a	—N/a	
1969	15th	Aida "Aidita" Concepción Betancourt Barreto; Santurce	Elba Iris Rivera Ramos; San Juan	Gilda Mae Mathews; Unknown	—N/a	—N/a	—N/a	—N/a	
1968	14th	Marylene Carrasquillo Toro; Río Piedras	Eda Patterne Vélez; Santurce	Miriam López Piñeiro; Río Piedras	—N/a	—N/a	—N/a	—N/a	
1967	13th	Ivonne Coll Mendoza; Fajardo	Unknown		—N/a	—N/a	—N/a	—N/a	
1966	12th	Carol Bajandas; Santurce	Miriam Reyes Redding; Río Piedras	Milagros Antonia Agostini Cámara; Ponce	—N/a	—N/a	—N/a	—N/a	
1965	11th	Gloria Mercedes Cobián Díaz; San Juan	Lydiette Reyes Redding; Río Piedras	Milka Marietti Morales; Santurce	—N/a	—N/a	—N/a	—N/a	
1964	10th	Yolanda Rodríguez Machín; Trujillo Alto	Esther González; Mayagüez	Lydiette Reyes Redding; Río Piedras	—N/a	—N/a	—N/a	—N/a	
1963	9th	Jeanette Biascoechea Rodríguez; San Juan	Unknown		—N/a	—N/a	—N/a	—N/a	
1962	8th	Ana Celia Sosa Arce; Santurce	Mary Margaret McCloskey Diaz; Santurce	Yolanda Rodríguez Machín; Trujillo Alto	—N/a	—N/a	—N/a	—N/a	

=== Miss Puerto Rico (1961) ===
In 1961, the Puerto Rican League Against Cancer held Miss Universe franchise under the name of "Miss Puerto Rico." Tony Beacon acted as director of the pageant, while Anna Santisteban acted as trainer of the contestants.

Year	Ed.	Winner (1st place)	1st runner-up (2nd place)	2nd runner-up (3rd place)	3rd runner-up (4th place)	4th runner-up (5th place)	Miss Photogenic	Miss Congeniality	Ref(s)
1961	7th	María Enid "Enid" del Valle Pérez; Aguadilla	Unknown						

=== None (1958–1960) ===
From 1958 to 1960, the Miss Universe franchise remained unclaimed in Puerto Rico. As a result, no editions were held.

Year	Ed.	Winner (1st place)	1st runner-up (2nd place)	2nd runner-up (3rd place)	3rd runner-up (4th place)	4th runner-up (5th place)	Miss Photogenic	Miss Congeniality	Ref(s)
1960	Due to the Miss Universe franchise being unclaimed in Puerto Rico, no editions were held from 1958 to 1960.								
1959	Due to the Miss Universe franchise being unclaimed in Puerto Rico, no editions were held from 1958 to 1960.								
1958	Due to the Miss Universe franchise being unclaimed in Puerto Rico, no editions were held from 1958 to 1960.								

=== Miss El Imparcial (1957) ===
In 1957, the El Imparcial newspaper held the Miss Universe franchise under the name of "Miss El Imparcial." Miguel Angel Yumet acted as national director.

Year	Ed.	Winner (1st place)	1st runner-up (2nd place)	2nd runner-up (3rd place)	3rd runner-up (4th place)	4th runner-up (5th place)	Miss Photogenic	Miss Congeniality	Ref(s)
1957	6th	María del Pilar "Mapita" Mercado Cordero; San Juan	Gloria del Carmen "Glorín" Vilá Font; Hyde Park	Ada Lucía Coriano Bonano; Río Piedras	Lourdes Antonia Malavé Cabañas; Santurce	Lina Gutiérrez Díaz; Caguas	—N/a	Ada María Salichs Santiago; Hato Rey	

=== Miss Puerto Rico Beauty (1956) ===
In 1956, the Puerto Rico Psychopedagogical Institute held the Miss Universe franchise under the name of "Miss Puerto Rico Beauty." Miguel Angel Yumet acted as national director.

Year	Ed.	Winner (1st place)	1st runner-up (2nd place)	2nd runner-up (3rd place)	3rd runner-up (4th place)	4th runner-up (5th place)	Miss Photogenic	Miss Congeniality	Ref(s)
1956	5th	Francisca "Paquita" Vivó Colón; San Juan	Winifred "Winnie" Natér Fajardo; Santurce	Blanquita Martínez; Caguas	—N/a	—N/a	—N/a	—N/a	

=== Miss El Imparcial (1953–1955) ===
From 1953 to 1955, the El Imparcial newspaper held the Miss Universe franchise under the name of "Miss El Imparcial." Miguel Angel Yumet acted as national director.

Year	Ed.	Winner (1st place)	1st runner-up (2nd place)	2nd runner-up (3rd place)	3rd runner-up (4th place)	4th runner-up (5th place)	Miss Photogenic	Miss Congeniality	Ref(s)
1955	4th	Carmen Laura Betancourt Burgos; Trujillo Alto	Gladys Rodríguez Villanueva; Río Grande	Juana "Ita" Medina Boria; Miramar	Lourdes Balasquide Pérez; Río Piedras	Sara "Sari" Rubio Negrón; Park Boulevard	—N/a	Lourdes and Nelly Balasquide Pérez; Río Piedras	
1954	3rd	Luz Belinda "Lucy" Santiago Nazario; Santurce	Myrta Esteves Jiménez; Río Piedras	Migdalia Mendoza Vidal; Cayey	—N/a	—N/a	—N/a	Virginia Cortés; Utuado	
1953	2nd	Wanda Irizarry Antonmattei; Río Piedras	—N/a	—N/a	—N/a	—N/a	—N/a	—N/a	

=== Miss Borinquen (1952) ===
In 1952, Weldon Farms, producers of Leche Alba (Milk Alba), and the El Imparcial newspaper held the Miss Universe franchise under the name of "Miss Borinquen." Miguel Angel Yumet acted as national director.

Year	Ed.	Winner (1st place)	1st runner-up (2nd place)	2nd runner-up (3rd place)	3rd runner-up (4th place)	4th runner-up (5th place)	Miss Photogenic	Miss Congeniality	Ref(s)
1952	1st	María Ileana "Marilia" Levy Bernal; Lares	—N/a	—N/a	—N/a	—N/a	—N/a	Carmen Lydia "Tuttie" Rivera Serbiá; Santurce	

== Anthems ==
This list includes anthems representative of Miss Universe Puerto Rico from the establishment of the franchise in 1952 to the present. The anthems are divided by the franchise holder under which they were sung.

=== Miss Universe Puerto Rico (2018–present) ===
Since 2018, the Hemisphere Media Group media conglomerate holds the Miss Universe franchise under the name of "Miss Universe Puerto Rico." It manages the franchise under its subsidiary WAPA-TV. Denise Quiñones acted as national director from 2018 to 2021, when Yizette Cifredo took over the role.

Spanish
English

No anthem has been introduced or used.

=== Miss Universe Puerto Rico (2010–2017) ===
From 2010 to 2017, the television producer Luisito Vigoreaux and model agent Desiree Lowry held the Miss Universe franchise under the name of "Miss Universe Puerto Rico." Lowry also acted as national director.

Spanish
English

No anthem was introduced or used.

=== Miss Puerto Rico Universo (2003–2009) ===
From 2003 to 2009, the beautician Magali Febles held the Miss Universe franchise under the name of "Miss Puerto Rico Universe." Febles also acted as national director.

In 2004, the Miss Puerto Rico Universe used the following anthem:

Spanish

Comienza la ilusión que siempre he de seguir
De ser una mujer que represente a mi país
Si no lo logro hoy
Tengo la oportunidad
De volver a empezar a cosechar ese sueño que me hace sonreír
Que me pone a pensar en
Mi gente
Mi isla
Mi bandera
Puerto Rico
Puerto Rico

Que orgullo llevo en mi
Mi pueblo está feliz
Pues logre defender
Amigas hice aquí
Que jamás podrá olvidar
Y por siempre será estrella en mi Universo
Y me pone a pensar en
Mi gente
Mi isla
Mi bandera
Puerto Rico

En un reina
En una estrella
Miss Puerto Rico Universe
Miss Puerto Rico Universe
Miss Puerto Rico Universe

English

The illusion begins that I always have to follow
To be a woman who represents my country
If I don't make it today
I have the opportunity
To start reaping that dream
That makes me smile again
That makes me think about
My people
My island
My flag
Puerto Rico
Puerto Rico

What a pride I carry in me
My town is happy
Well, I managed to defend
Made friends here
That it will never forget
And will always be a star in my universe

And it makes me think about
My people
My island
My flag
Puerto Rico

A queen
A star
Miss Puerto Rico Universe
Miss Puerto Rico Universe
Miss Puerto Rico Universe

=== Miss Puerto Rico Universo (1999–2002) ===
From 1999 to 2002, the TeleOnce television station held the Miss Universe franchise under the name of "Miss Puerto Rico Universe. Producer Francisco "Paquitín" Cordero and his wife, model agent Itza Cordero, acted as national directors.

In 1999, the Miss Puerto Rico Universe used the following anthem:

Spanish

Miss Puerto Rico Universe es mi oportunidad
Para alcanzar aquellos sueños que quiero realizar
Es mi sueño anhelando de cara a la noche final
Representado a mi pueblo con orgullo y dignidad

Seré la reina, bella sin igual
Seré la reina por mi sentido de humanidad
Seré la reina y así podré lograr representar a la mujer puertorriqueña

English

Miss Puerto Rico Universe is my chance
To achieve those dreams that I want to realise
It's my dream longing for the final night
Representing my town with pride and dignity

I'll be the queen, unparallelled beauty
I'll be the queen for my sense of humanity
I will be the queen and so I can represent the Puerto Rican woman

=== Miss Universe Puerto Rico (1996–1998) ===
From 1996 to 1998, the Telemundo Puerto Rico television station held the Miss Universe franchise under the name of "Miss Universe Puerto Rico." Francisco "Paquitín" Cordero and his wife Itza Cordero acted as national directors.

From 1996 to 1998, Miss Puerto Rico Universe used the following anthem:

Spanish

Quiero ser la bella mujer que todos quieren conocer
Quiero pasar el rumbo de un nuevo amanecer
Hay mucho por caminar y decisiones que tomar
Pero al final del viaje mi sueño podré alcanzar

Quiero ser Miss Universe Puerto Rico
La más bella boricua
Quiero ser Miss Universe
Miss Universe
Miss Universe Puerto Rico

Quiero ser la bella mujer que todos quieren conocer
Quiero pasar el rumbo de un nuevo amanecer
Hay mucho por caminar y decisiones que tomar
Pero al final del viaje mi sueño podré alcanzar

Quiero ser Miss Universe Puerto Rico
La más bella boricua
Quiero ser Miss Universe
Miss Universe
Miss Universe Puerto Rico

Quiero ser Miss Universe Puerto Rico
La más bella boricua
Quiero ser Miss Universe
Miss Universe
Miss Universe Puerto Rico

English

I want to be the beautiful woman that everyone wants to meet
I want to move the course of a new dawn
There's a lot to walk and decisions to make
But at the end of the journey I will be able to reach my dream

I want to be Miss Universe Puerto Rico
The most beautiful Boricua
I want to be Miss Universe
Miss Universe
Miss Universe Puerto Rico

I want to be the beautiful woman that everyone wants to meet
I want to move the course of a new dawn
There's a lot to walk and decisions to make
But at the end of the journey I will be able to reach my dream

I want to be Miss Universe Puerto Rico
The most beautiful Boricua
I want to be Miss Universe
Miss Universe
Miss Universe Puerto Rico

I want to be Miss Universe Puerto Rico
The most beautiful Boricua
I want to be Miss Universe
Miss Universe
Miss Universe Puerto Rico

=== Miss Puerto Rico (1962–1995) ===
From 1962 to 1995, the model agent Anna Santisteban held the Miss Universe franchise under the name of "Miss Puerto Rico." Santisteban also acted as national director.

From 1972 to 1995, Miss Puerto Rico used the following anthem:

Spanish

Me siento muy feliz
Me embarga la emoción
Pues hoy yo represento a ti
A mi pueblo, mi país
No se si triunfaré
Más no me importará
Si entre nosotras esta la que ha de ser
Una reina feliz

Hoy todo es ilusión
Jamás lo olvidaré
Recuerdo grato el corazón que siempre guardaré
Mañana un nuevo sol
Valiente brillará
Puerto Rico tendrá la que ha de ser
Una reina feliz

Hoy todo es ilusión
Jamás lo olvidaré
Recuerdo grato el corazón que siempre guardaré
Mañana un nuevo sol
Valiente brillará
Puerto Rico tendrá la que ha de ser
Señorita Puerto Rico
Una reina feliz

English

I feel very happy
I'm excited
Well, today I represent you
My people, my country
I don't know if I'll succeed
But I won't care
If among us there is the one who has to be
A happy queen

Today everything is illusion
I will never forget it
Pleasant remembrance to heart that I will always keep
Tomorrow a new sun
Brave will shine
Puerto Rico will have the one who has to be
A happy queen

Today everything is illusion
Pleasant remembrance to heart that I will always keep
Tomorrow a new sun
Brave will shine
Puerto Rico will have the one who has to be
A happy queen
Miss Puerto Rico
A happy queen

=== Miss Puerto Rico (1961) ===
In 1961, the Puerto Rican League Against Cancer held Miss Universe franchise under the name of "Miss Puerto Rico." Tony Beacon acted as director of the pageant, while Anna Santisteban acted as trainer of the contestants.

Spanish
English

Unknown

=== None (1958–1960) ===
From 1958 to 1960, no Miss Puerto Rico was crowned or edition held, as the franchise remained unclaimed.

=== Miss El Imparcial (1957) ===
In 1957, the El Imparcial newspaper held the Miss Universe franchise under the name of "Miss El Imparcial." Miguel Angel Yumet acted as national director.

Spanish
English

Unknown

=== Miss Puerto Rico Beauty (1956) ===
In 1956, the Puerto Rico Psychopedagogical Institute held the Miss Universe franchise under the name of "Miss Puerto Rico Beauty." Miguel Angel Yumet acted as national director.

Spanish
English

Unknown

=== Miss El Imparcial (1953–1955) ===
From 1953 to 1955, the El Imparcial newspaper held the Miss Universe franchise under the name of "Miss El Imparcial." Miguel Angel Yumet acted as national director.

Spanish
English

Unknown

=== Miss Borinquen (1952) ===
In 1952, Weldon Farms, producers of Leche Alba (Milk Alba), and the El Imparcial newspaper held the Miss Universe franchise under the name of "Miss Borinquen." Miguel Angel Yumet acted as national director.

Spanish
English

Unknown

== Crowns ==
This list includes the crowns used by Miss Universe Puerto Rico titleholders in ascending order from the establishment of the franchise in 1952 to the present. The crown are divided by the franchise holder under which they were awarded.

=== Miss Universe Puerto Rico (2018–present) ===
Since 2018, the Hemisphere Media Group media conglomerate holds the Miss Universe franchise under the name of "Miss Universe Puerto Rico." It manages the franchise under its subsidiary WAPA-TV. Denise Quiñones acted as national director from 2018 to 2021, when Yizette Cifredo took over the role.

==== Legado (2026–present) ====
Since 2026, Miss Universe Puerto Rico wears the Legado (Legacy) crown. Designed by Isaac Demel and crafted in Italy under the auspices of Lido Jewelers, it is made of white gold (14 carats) and silver, featuring 78 small clear topazes (79.95 carats), one large pearl (12.88 millimeters), and two small pearls. It consists of numerous stacked, connected, curved tines studded with diamonds with flower designs, representing life and growth, over a base with waved tines, representing the beaches of Puerto Rico. A diamond-studded female figurine stands in the center with raised arms carrying a star with a pearl, symbolizing Miss Universe 1970 Marisol Malaret, its main source of inspiration as the first Puerto Rican to win Miss Universe. The 78 diamonds embedded in the crown represent the municipalities of Puerto Rico.

==== Evolución (2023–2025) ====
From 2023 to 2025, Miss Universe Puerto Rico wore the Evolución (Evolution) crown. Designed and crafted by Gabriela Rodríguez under the auspices of Lido Jewelers, it is made of white gold (18 carats) and silver, featuring numerous small clear topazes (10 carats), five large aquamarines, and one large pearl. It consists of numerous vertically straight, long tines at different scales studded with diamonds, symbolizing the perseverance and solidarity of the Puerto Rican people. In between the tines, it has aquamarines, symbolizing peace and joy. It also has a pearl in the center, symbolizing the elegance and generosity of Miss Universe Puerto Rico. The crown was valued at $36,000 in 2023.

==== Renacer (2018–2022) ====
From 2018 to 2022, the Miss Universe Puerto Rico wore the Renacer (Rebirth) crown. Designed by Gabriela Rodríguez and crafted by Antonio Colón under the auspices of Lido Jewelry, it is made of silver with gold plating, featuring numerous small pearls and clear topazes, and seven large green prasiolites. It consists of seven ovals in different scales studded with pearls and topazes along the outlines, and a prasiolite in the center, all representing the branches of the Ceiba tree, used as the main source of inspiration to highlight the resilience and regrowth of Puerto Rico after the devastating impacts of Hurricane Maria in 2017. Intertwined golden strips, representing the roots of the tree, connect to the pearl-adorned base, representing the earth. Its colors represent the regrowth of vegetation in Puerto Rico. The crown was valued at $30,000 in 2018.

=== Miss Universe Puerto Rico (2010–2017) ===
From 2010 to 2017, the television producer Luisito Vigoreaux and model agent Desiree Lowry held the Miss Universe franchise under the name of "Miss Universe Puerto Rico." Lowry also acted as national director.

==== Unnamed (2010–2017) ====
From 2010 to 2017, Miss Universe Puerto Rico wore a crown designed by Gabriela Rodríguez and crafted by Antonio Colón under the auspices of Joyería Reinhold. It is made of silver with gold details (14 carats) and plating (24 carats), featuring numerous pearls and 32 clear topazes. It consists of 78 waved, vertical, long, asymmetric tines, representing the Puerto Rican municipalities, scattered with pearls, symboling the beaches of Puerto Rico. In the center stands a crowned, golden female figure surrounded by a planetary ring with five stars, representing the five Puerto Rican Miss Universe winners. The band is adorned with pearls and topazes over a white fur brim. The crown was valued at $50,000 in 2009.

=== Miss Puerto Rico Universo (2003–2009) ===
From 2003 to 2009, the beautician Magali Febles held the Miss Universe franchise under the name of "Miss Puerto Rico Universe." Febles also acted as national director.

==== Unnamed (2004–2009) ====
From 2004 to 2009, Miss Puerto Rico Universe wore a crown crafted by Bared Jewelers. It is made of white gold, featuring numerous rhinestones and 21 pearls. It consists of intertwined, curved tines studded with topazes, and flower designs studded with pearls varying in size in the center.

==== Unnamed (2003) ====
In 2003, Miss Puerto Rico Universe wore a crown crafted by Stampar Jewelers. It is made of white gold (14 carats), featuring 58 Australian pearls, and numerous Israeli brilliants (5 carats). It consists of intertwined, curved tines, of the which only the ones in the center are studded with pearls varying in size. The four larger pearls symbolize the first four Puerto Rican winners of Miss Universe. The crown represents the natural beauty, elegance, and grace of the Puerto Rican woman.

=== Miss Puerto Rico Universo (1999–2002) ===
From 1999 to 2002, the TeleOnce television station held the Miss Universe franchise under the name of "Miss Puerto Rico Universe. Producer Francisco "Paquitín" Cordero and his wife, model agent Itza Cordero, acted as national directors.

==== Unnamed (1999–2002) ====
From 1999 to 2002, Miss Puerto Rico Universe wore a silver crown, featuring numerous rhinestones and pearls. It consists of eleven side by side rectangles in different scales studded with rhinestones. Inside its central rectangle stands a crowned female figurine with a scepter, representing Miss Puerto Rico Universe. The inside of the rest of the rectangles are adorned with an intricate design studded with rhinestones and pearls. Its base is also embedded with the same intricate design.

=== Miss Universe Puerto Rico (1996–1998) ===
From 1996 to 1998, the Telemundo Puerto Rico television station held the Miss Universe franchise under the name of "Miss Universe Puerto Rico." Francisco "Paquitín" Cordero and his wife Itza Cordero acted as national directors.

==== Unnamed (1996–1998) ====
From 1996 to 1998, Miss Universe Puerto Rico wore a golden crown, featuring numerous rhinestones and pearl. It consists of 7 equal connected circular star-like shapes. A crowned female figurine with a scepter surrendered by two planetary rings stands in the center, representing Miss Universe Puerto Rico.

=== Miss Puerto Rico (1962–1995) ===
From 1962 to 1995, the model agent Anna Santisteban held the Miss Universe franchise under the name of "Miss Puerto Rico." Santisteban also acted as national director.

==== Unnamed (1972–1995) ====
From 1972 to 1995, Miss Puerto Rico wore a crown designed by Manuel Núñez and crafted by Antonio Colón under the auspices of Joyería Reinhold. It was made of gold and silver, featuring 254 brilliants (6 carats) and 288 cultured pearls (3 to 9 millimeters). It consists of numerous slightly curved, vertical, asymmetric, long tines scattered with pearls, symbolizing the sun's rays and the sea. A diamond-studded palm tree design holds a diamond-studded female figurine with a crown and scepter in the center, symbolizing Miss Puerto Rico. It has a band adorned with pearls over an ermine fur brim. The main source of inspiration for the crown was the natural landscape of the archipelago and island. It was valued at $8,000-10,000 in 1972.

==== Unnamed (1971) ====
In 1971, Miss Puerto Rico wore a silver crown, featuring brilliants. It consisted of three oval shapes with an indentation in the center, on top of which stood an intricate design.

==== Unnamed (1966–1970) ====
From 1966 to 1970, Miss Puerto Rico wore a silver crown, featuring brilliants. It consisted of several varying shapes, including some ogees, two circles, and tree pentagons.

==== Unnamed (1962–1965) ====
From 1962 to 1965, Miss Puerto Rico wore a different crown each year. In 1962, she wore a brilliant studded crown, consisting of five vertical triangular tines. In 1963, she wore a crown made of brilliants and other precious stones. It consisted several oval shapes. In 1964, she wore a crown made of brilliants and other precious stones. It consisted several scalloped shapes. In 1965, she wore a crown made of brilliants and other precious stones. It consisted several oval shapes with an elaborate design inside each one.

=== Miss Puerto Rico (1961) ===
In 1961, the Puerto Rican League Against Cancer held Miss Universe franchise under the name of "Miss Puerto Rico." Tony Beacon acted as director of the pageant, while Anna Santisteban acted as trainer of the contestants.

==== Unnamed (1961) ====
In 1961, Miss Puerto Rico wore a crown featuring brilliants. It included star-like designs around its top circumference.

=== None (1958–1960) ===
From 1958 to 1960, no Miss Puerto Rico was crowned, as the franchise remained unclaimed.

=== Miss El Imparcial (1957) ===
In 1957, the El Imparcial newspaper held the Miss Universe franchise under the name of "Miss El Imparcial." Miguel Angel Yumet acted as national director.

==== Unnamed (1957) ====
In 1957, Miss Puerto Rico wore a crown featuring brilliants. It consisted of around 20 straight, vertical, tapering tines studded with brilliants.

=== Miss Puerto Rico Beauty (1956) ===
In 1956, the Puerto Rico Psychopedagogical Institute held the Miss Universe franchise under the name of "Miss Puerto Rico Beauty." Miguel Angel Yumet acted as national director.

==== Unnamed (1956) ====
In 1956, Miss Puerto Rico wore a crown made of brilliants and other precious stones. It consisted several circular shapes.

=== Miss El Imparcial (1953–1955) ===
From 1953 to 1955, the El Imparcial newspaper held the Miss Universe franchise under the name of "Miss El Imparcial." Miguel Angel Yumet acted as national director.

==== Unnamed (1953-1955) ====
From 1953 to 1955, Miss Puerto Rico wore a different crown each year. In 1953, Miss Puerto Rico crown made of brilliants and other precious stones. It consisted of several studded ovals on top of star-like designs. In 1954, Miss Puerto Rico wore a crown made of brilliants and overt precious stones. It consisted numerous, stacked circular tines. It also included a plaque in the center. In 1955, Miss Puerto Rico wore a crown featuring brilliants. It consisted of a laurel wreath with a star-like design in the center.

=== Miss Borinquen (1952) ===
In 1952, Weldon Farms, producers of Leche Alba (Milk Alba), and the El Imparcial newspaper held the Miss Universe franchise under the name of "Miss Borinquen." Miguel Angel Yumet acted as national director.

==== Unnamed (1952) ====
From 1952, Miss Borinquen wore a crown made of brilliants. It constisted of a large star-like design with one small art deco sunburst design on either side.

== Titleholders ==
This list includes the name, municipality, age, and international placement of Miss Universe Puerto Rico titleholders in ascending order from the inaugural edition of the competition in 1952 to the present. The titleholders are divided by the franchise holder under which they won the title.

Color key

- : Miss Universe winner
- : Finalist in Top 3/5/6
- : Semifinalist in Top 9/10/12
- : Quarterfinalist in Top 13/15/16/20/21/30
- : Special awards winner

=== Miss Universe Puerto Rico (2018–present) ===
Since 2018, the Hemisphere Media Group media conglomerate holds the Miss Universe franchise under the name of "Miss Universe Puerto Rico." It manages the franchise under its subsidiary WAPA-TV. Denise Quiñones acted as national director from 2018 to 2021, when Yizette Cifredo took over the role.

Year	MU ed.	Miss Universe Puerto Rico				Performance in Miss Universe		Ref(s)
Year	MU ed.	No. (Note: Sequential numerical identifier of titleholder.)	Name (birth–death)	Age (Note: Age at the time of becoming the titleholder.)	Rep.	Plmt.	Special award	Ref(s)
2026	75th	72nd	Jennifer Barreto (née Abreu Mora) (b. 1998)	27	San Sebastián	TBA		
2025	74th	71st	Zashely Nicole Alicea Rivera (b. 1999)	26	Dorado	Top 12	—N/a	
2024	73rd	70th	Jennifer Colón Alvarado (b. 1987)	36	Orocovis	Top 12	—N/a	
2023	72nd	69th	Karla Inelisse Guilfú Acevedo (b. 1998)	25	Patillas	Top 5	Voice For Change (Gold Winner)	
2022	71st	68th	Ashley Ann Barreto Cariño (b. 1994)	28	Fajardo	Top 5	—N/a	
2021	70th	67th	Michelle Marie Colón Ramírez (b. 2000)	21	Loíza	Top 10	—N/a	
2020	69th	66th	Estefanía Natalia Soto Torres (b. 1992)	28	San Sebastián	Top 10	—N/a	
2019	68th	65th	Madison Sara Anderson Berríos (b. 1995)	23	Toa Baja	1st Runner-Up	—N/a	
2018	67th	64th	Kiara Liz Ortega Delgado (b. 1993)	24	Rincón	Top 5	—N/a	

=== Miss Universe Puerto Rico (2010–2017) ===
From 2010 to 2017, the television producer Luisito Vigoreaux and model agent Desiree Lowry held the Miss Universe franchise under the name of "Miss Universe Puerto Rico." Lowry also acted as national director.

Year	MU ed.	Miss Universe Puerto Rico				Performance in Miss Universe		Ref(s)
Year	MU ed.	No.	Name (birth–death)	Age	Rep.	Plmt.	Special award	Ref(s)
2017	66th	63rd	Danyeshka "Danna" Hernández Valentín (b. 1996)	19	San Juan	Unplaced	—N/a	
2016	65th	62nd	Brenda Azaria Jiménez Hernández (b. 1994)	21	Aguadilla	Unplaced	—N/a	
2016	—N/a		Kristhielee Yinaira Caride Santiago (b. 1991)	24	Isabela	First runner-up succeeded as Miss Universe Puerto Rico after dethronement of titleholder due to failed press obligations.		
2015	64th	61st	Catalina Morales Gómez (b. 1990)	23	Guaynabo	Unplaced	—N/a	
2014	63rd	60th	Gabriela Berríos Pagán (b. 1990)	22	Toa Baja	Unplaced	Miss Photogenic	
2013	62nd	59th	Monic Marie Pérez Díaz (b. 1990)	22	Arecibo	Top 16	—N/a	
2012	61st	58th	Bodine Koehler Peña (b. 1992)	19	Río Grande	Unplaced	—N/a	
2011	60th	57th	Viviana Ortiz Pastrana (b. 1986)	24	Corozal	Top 16	—N/a	
2010	59th	56th	Mariana Paola Vicente Morales (b. 1989)	20	Río Grande	Top 10	—N/a	

=== Miss Puerto Rico Universe (2003–2009) ===
From 2003 to 2009, the beautician Magali Febles held the Miss Universe franchise under the name of "Miss Puerto Rico Universe." Febles also acted as national director.

Year	MU ed.	Miss Puerto Rico Universe				Performance in Miss Universe		Ref(s)
Year	MU ed.	No.	Name (birth–death)	Age	Rep.	Plmt.	Special award	Ref(s)
2009	58th	55th	Mayra Matos Pérez (b. 1987)	20	Cabo Rojo	4th Runner-Up	—N/a	
2008	57th	54th	Ingrid Marie Rivera Santos (b. 1983)	24	Dorado	Unplaced	—N/a	
2007	56th	53rd	Wilmadilis "Uma" Blasini Pérez (b. 1982)	24	Guayanilla	Unplaced	—N/a	
2006	—N/a		Marilyn Bartolomei Balay (b. 1982)	23	Ponce	Locally, the second runner-up succeeded as Miss Puerto Rico Universe after titleholder became Miss Universe.		
2006	55th	52nd	Zuleyka Jerrís Rivera Mendoza (b. 1987)	18	Salinas	Miss Universe 2006	—N/a	
2005	54th	51st	Cynthia Enid Olavarría Rivera (b. 1982)	21	Salinas	1st Runner-Up	—N/a	
2004	53rd	50th	Alba Giselle Reyes Santos (b. 1981)	22	Cidra	2nd Runner-Up	Miss Photogenic	
2003	52nd	49th	Carla Tricoli Rodríguez (b. 1982)	20	Vieques	Unplaced	Miss Photogenic	

=== Miss Puerto Rico Universe (1999–2002) ===
From 1999 to 2002, the TeleOnce television station held the Miss Universe franchise under the name of "Miss Puerto Rico Universe. Producer Francisco "Paquitín" Cordero and his wife, model agent Itza Cordero, acted as national directors.

Year	MU ed.	Miss Puerto Rico Universe				Performance in Miss Universe		Ref(s)
Year	MU ed.	No.	Name (birth–death)	Age	Rep.	Plmt.	Special award	Ref(s)
2002	51st	48th	Isis Marie Casalduc González (b. 1981)	20	Utuado	Unplaced	Miss Photogenic	
2001	—N/a		Joanna Marie Treviño Cuadrado (b. 1977)	23	Añasco	Locally, the first runner-up succeeded as Miss Puerto Rico Universe after titleholder became Miss Universe.		
2001	50th	47th	Denise Marie Quiñones August (b. 1980)	20	Lares	Miss Universe 2001	Miss Photogenic	
2000	49th	46th	Zoraida Isabel "Zoribel" Fonalledas Ferraiouli (b. 1977)	22	Guaynabo	Unplaced	—N/a	
1999	48th	45th	Brenda Liz López Ramos (b. 1976)	22	Lares	Top 10	Miss Photogenic	

=== Miss Universe Puerto Rico (1996–1998) ===
From 1996 to 1998, the Telemundo Puerto Rico television station held the Miss Universe franchise under the name of "Miss Universe Puerto Rico." Francisco "Paquitín" Cordero and his wife Itza Cordero, acted as national directors.

Year	MU ed.	Miss Universe Puerto Rico				Performance in Miss Universe		Ref(s)
Year	MU ed.	No.	Name (birth–death)	Age	Rep.	Plmt.	Special award	Ref(s)
1998	47th	44th	Joyce Marie Giraud Mojica (b. 1975)	22	Aguas Buenas	2nd Runner-Up	—N/a	
1997	46th	43rd	Ana Rosa Brito Suárez (b. 1971)	26	San Juan	Top 10	—N/a	
1996	45th	42nd	Sarybel Velilla Cabeza (b. 1976)	19	Toa Alta	Unplaced	—N/a	

=== Miss Puerto Rico (1962–1995) ===
From 1962 to 1995, the model agent Anna Santisteban held the Miss Universe franchise under the name of "Miss Puerto Rico." Santisteban also acted as national director.

Year	MU ed.	Miss Puerto Rico				Performance in Miss Universe		Ref(s)
Year	MU ed.	No.	Name (birth–death)	Age	Rep.	Plmt.	Special award	Ref(s)
1995	44th	41st	Desirée Louny Lowry Rodríguez (b. 1972)	22	Corozal	Top 6	—N/a	
1994	43rd	40th	Brenda Esther Robles Cortés (b. 1975)	18	Isabela	Unplaced	—N/a	
1993	Locally, no finalist succeeded as Miss Puerto Rico after titleholder became Miss Universe.						—N/a	
1993	42nd	39th	Dayanara Torres Delgado (b. 1974)	18	Toa Alta	Miss Universe 1993	—N/a	
1992	41st	38th	Daisy García Rodríguez (b. 1970)	21	Bayamón	Unplaced	—N/a	
1991	40th	37th	Lissette Marie Bouret Echevarría (b. 1965)	25	Toa Alta	Unplaced	—N/a	
1990	39th	36th	María Luisa Fortuño Cosimi (b. 1968)	21	Guaynabo	Unplaced	—N/a	List
1989	38th	35th	Catalina María Villar Ruiz (b. 1969)	19	Salinas	Unplaced	—N/a	List
1988	37th	34th	Isabel María Pardo Cubeñas (b. 1964)	23	Guaynabo	Unplaced	—N/a	List
1987	36th	33rd	Laurie Tamara Simpson Rivera (b. 1968)	18	San Juan	4th Runner-Up	—N/a	List
1986	35th	32nd	Elizabeth Robison Latalladi (b. 1966)	20	San Germán	Top 10	—N/a	List
1985	—N/a		Arlene Ramírez Román (b. 1965)	20	San Germán	Locally, the first runner-up succeeded as Miss Puerto Rico after titleholder became Miss Universe.		List
1985	34th	31st	Deborah Fátima Carthy Deu (b. 1966)	19	San Juan	Miss Universe 1985	—N/a	List
1984	33rd	30th	Sandra Beauchamp Roche (b. 1965)	18	Mayagüez	Unplaced	—N/a	List
1983	32nd	29th	Carmen Batiz Vergara (b. 1965)	17	Trujillo Alto	Unplaced	—N/a	List
1982	31st	28th	Lourdes Milagros Mantero Hormazábal (b. 1959)	23	Juncos	Unplaced	—N/a	List
1981	30th	27th	Carmen Lotti Rodríguez (b. 1961)	20	Guaynabo	Unplaced	—N/a	List
1980	29th	26th	Agnes Tañón Correa (b. 1962)	18	Caguas	Top 12	—N/a	List
1979	28th	25th	Audrey Teresa "Tere" López Hernández (b. 1961)	18	Mayagüez	Unplaced	—N/a	List
1978	27th	24th	Ada Cecille Perkins Flores (1959–1980)	18	San Juan	Unplaced	—N/a	List
1977	26th	23rd	Maria Del Mar Rivera Veglio (b. 1959)	17	Ponce	Unplaced	—N/a	List
1976	25th	22nd	Elizabeth Zayas Ortiz (b. 1958)	17	Salinas	Unplaced	—N/a	List
1975	24th	21st	Lorell Del Carmen Carmona Juan (b. 1957)	18	San Germán	Unplaced	—N/a	List
1974	23rd	20th	Sonia María Stege Chardón (b. 1956)	18	San Juan	Top 12	—N/a	List
1973	22nd	19th	Gladys Vanessa Colón Díaz (b. 1955)	18	Orocovis	Unplaced	—N/a	List
1972	21st	18th	Bárbara Idelisse Torres Viñolo (b. 1953)	18	Santurce	Unplaced	—N/a	List
1971	20th	17th	Idalia Margarita "Beba" Franco Cantino (b. 1946)	25	Santurce	3rd Runner-Up	—N/a	List
1970	—N/a		Ivonne "Ivy" Menéndez Conde (b. 1950)	20	San Juan	Locally, the first runner-up succeeded as Miss Puerto Rico after titleholder became Miss Universe.		List
1970	19th	16th	Marisol Malaret Contreras (1949–2023)	20	Santurce	Miss Universe 1970	—N/a	List
1969	18th	15th	Aida Concepción "Aidita" Betancourt Barreto (1949–2025)	20	Santurce	Unplaced	—N/a	List
1968	17th	14th	Marylene Carrasquillo Toro (b. 1949)	19	Río Piedras	Unplaced	—N/a	List
1967	16th	13th	Ivonne Coll Mendoza (b. 1947)	19	Fajardo	Unplaced	—N/a	List
1966	15th	12th	Carol Bajandas (b. 1948)	18	Santurce	Unplaced	—N/a	List
1965	14th	11th	Gloria Mercedes Cobián Díaz (1946–2024)	19	San Juan	Unplaced	—N/a	List
1964	13th	10th	Yolanda Rodríguez Machín (b. 1943)	21	Trujillo Alto	Unplaced	—N/a	List
1963	12th	9th	Jeanette Biascoechea Rodríguez (b. 1945)	18	San Juan	Unplaced	—N/a	List
1962	11th	8th	Ana Celia Sosa Arce (1938–2022)	23	Santurce	Unplaced	—N/a	List

=== Miss Puerto Rico (1961) ===
In 1961, the Puerto Rican League Against Cancer held Miss Universe franchise under the name of "Miss Puerto Rico." Tony Beacon acted as director of the pageant, while Anna Santisteban acted as trainer of the contestants.

Year	MU ed.	Miss Puerto Rico				Performance in Miss Universe		Ref(s)
Year	MU ed.	No.	Name (birth–death)	Age	Rep.	Plmt.	Special award	Ref(s)
1961	10th	7th	María Enid "Enid" Del Valle Pérez (b. 1940)	21	Aguadilla	Unplaced	—N/a	List

=== None (1958–1960) ===
From 1958 to 1960, the Miss Universe franchise remained unclaimed in Puerto Rico. As a result, no pageant was held and titleholder crowned. Puerto Rico was absent from the international competition.

Year	MU ed.	Miss Puerto Rico				Performance in Miss Universe		Ref(s)
Year	MU ed.	No.	Name (birth–death)	Age	Rep.	Plmt.	Special award	Ref(s)
1960	9th	Due to the Miss Universe franchise being unclaimed in Puerto Rico, no titleholder was crowned from 1958 to 1960.						
1959	8th	Due to the Miss Universe franchise being unclaimed in Puerto Rico, no titleholder was crowned from 1958 to 1960.						
1958	7th	Due to the Miss Universe franchise being unclaimed in Puerto Rico, no titleholder was crowned from 1958 to 1960.						

=== Miss El Imparcial (1957) ===
In 1957, the El Imparcial newspaper held the Miss Universe franchise under the name of "Miss El Imparcial." Miguel Angel Yumet acted as national director.

Year	MU ed.	Miss El Imparcial				Performance in Miss Universe		Ref(s)
Year	MU ed.	No.	Name (birth–death)	Age	Rep.	Plmt.	Special award	Ref(s)
1957	6th		María del Pilar "Mapita" Mercado Cordero (1938–2006)	18	San Juan	Unplaced	Miss Congeniality	List

=== Miss Puerto Rico Beauty (1956) ===
In 1956, the Puerto Rico Psychopedagogical Institute held the Miss Universe franchise under the name of "Miss Puerto Rico Beauty." Miguel Angel Yumet acted as national director.

Year	MU ed.	Miss Puerto Rico Beauty				Performance in Miss Universe		Ref(s)
Year	MU ed.	No.	Name (birth–death)	Age	Rep.	Plmt.	Special award	Ref(s)
1956	5th		Francisca "Paquita" Vivo Colón (b. 1936)	20	San Juan	Unplaced	—N/a	List

=== Miss El Imparcial (1953–1955) ===
From 1953 to 1955, the El Imparcial newspaper held the Miss Universe franchise under the name of "Miss El Imparcial." Miguel Angel Yumet acted as national director.

Year	MU ed.	Miss El Imparcial				Performance in Miss Universe		Ref(s)
Year	MU ed.	No.	Name (birth–death)	Age	Rep.	Plmt.	Special award	Ref(s)
1955	4th		Carmen Laura Betancourt Burgos (b. 1933–2021)	21	Trujillo Alto	Unplaced	Miss Friendly Relations (Note: Awarded the title of Miss Friendly Relations at a reception held hours before the final on July 22. The award was presented by Long Beach Port in association with the Miss Universe Organization.)	List
1954	3rd		Belinda "Lucy" Santiago Nazario (b. 1930)	23	Santurce	Unplaced	Miss Charming (Note: Awarded the title of Miss Charming at a reception after the final. The award was presented by the officers of the US Cavalier in association with the Miss Universe Organization.)	List
1953	2nd		Wanda Irizarry Antonmattei (b. 1933–2018)	20	Río Piedras	Unplaced	—N/a	List

=== Miss Borinquen (1952) ===
In 1952, Weldon Farms, producers of Leche Alba (Milk Alba), and the El Imparcial newspaper held the Miss Universe franchise under the name of "Miss Borinquen." Miguel Angel Yumet acted as national director.

Year	MU ed.	Miss Borinquen				Performance in Miss Universe		Ref(s)
Year	MU ed.	No.	Name (birth–death)	Age	Rep.	Plmt.	Special award	Ref(s)
1952	1st		María Ileana "Marilia" Levy Bernal (b. 1933–1995)	19	Lares	Unplaced	—N/a	List

== National costumes ==
This list includes the main source of inspiration and designer for the national costume of Miss Universe Puerto Rico titleholders in ascending order from the inaugural edition of the competition in 1952 to the present. The costumes are divided by the franchise holder under which they were created.

=== Miss Universe Puerto Rico (2018–present) ===
Since 2018, the Hemisphere Media Group media conglomerate holds the Miss Universe franchise under the name of "Miss Universe Puerto Rico." It manages the franchise under its subsidiary WAPA-TV. Denise Quiñones acted as national director from 2018 to 2021, when Yizette Cifredo took over the role.

Year	MU ed.	Titleholder		National costume	Designer	Ref(s)
Year	MU ed.	No.	Name	National costume	Designer	Ref(s)
2026	75th	72nd	Jennifer Barreto (née Abreu Mora)	Moriviví plant	Joshuan Aponte	
2025	74th	71st	Zashely Nicole Alicea Rivera	Zumbador Verde hummingbird	Joshuan Aponte	
2024	73rd	70th	Jennifer Colón Alvarado	Traditional jíbara	Joshuan Aponte	
2023	72nd	69th	Karla Inelisse Guilfú Acevedo	San Sebastián Street Festival	Joshuan Aponte	
2022	71st	68th	Ashley Ann Barreto Cariño	Arecibo Telescope	DJ King Authur	
2021	70th	67th	Michelle Marie Colón Ramírez	Bomba music	Leonel Lirio and Luis Rivas	
2020	69th	66th	Estefanía Natalia Soto Torres	Astrologer Walter Mercado	Joshuan Aponte	
2019	68th	65th	Madison Sara Anderson Berríos	Maga flower	Joshuan Aponte	
2018	67th	64th	Kiara Liz Ortega Delgado	Hurricane Maria	Joshuan Aponte	

=== Miss Universe Puerto Rico (2010–2017) ===
From 2010 to 2017, the television producer Luisito Vigoreaux and model agent Desiree Lowry held the Miss Universe franchise under the name of "Miss Universe Puerto Rico." Lowry also acted as national director.

Year	MU ed.	Titleholder		National costume	Designer	Ref(s)
Year	MU ed.	No.	Name	National costume	Designer	Ref(s)
2017	66th	63rd	Danyeshka "Danna" Hernández Valentín	Flamboyán tree	Jaer Cabán	
2016	65th	62nd	Brenda Azaria Jiménez Hernández	Puerto Rico Coat of arms	Javier Arnaldo	
2015	64th	61st	Catalina Morales Gómez	Losas Criollas (creole tiles)	Jaer Cabán	
2014	63rd	60th	Gabriela Berríos Pagán	Danza music	Jaer Cabán	
2013	62nd	59th	Monic Marie Pérez Díaz	Bioluminescent bay	Jaer Cabán	
2012	61st	58th	Bodine Koehler Peña	Taíno goddess Atabey	Astrid Castro	
2011	60th	57th	Viviana Ortiz Pastrana	Vejigante character	Jaer Cabán and Kenneth Meléndez	
2010	59th	56th	Mariana Paola Vicente Morales	El Yunque rainforest	Elier Aubret	

=== Miss Puerto Rico Universe (2003–2009) ===
From 2003 to 2009, the beautician Magali Febles held the Miss Universe franchise under the name of "Miss Puerto Rico Universe." Febles also acted as national director.

Year	MU ed.	Titleholder		National costume	Designer	Ref(s)
Year	MU ed.	No.	Name	National costume	Designer	Ref(s)
2009	58th	55th	Mayra Matos Pérez	Boxing champion	Raymond Rodríguez	
2008	57th	54th	Ingrid Marie Rivera Santos	Indigenous Taína	Adam Hernándes and Alfredo Cartagena	
2007	56th	53rd	Wilmadilis "Uma" Blasini Pérez	Pirate Roberto Cofresí	Raymond Rodríguez	
2006	55th	52nd	Zuleyka Jerrís Rivera Mendoza	Taíno goddess Atabey	Raymond Rodríguez	
2005	54th	51st	Cynthia Enid Olavarría Rivera	Pearl of the Caribbean epithet	Leonel Lirio	
2004	53rd	50th	Alba Giselle Reyes Santos	Sun of Jayuya Taíno petroglyph	Angel López	
2003	52nd	49th	Carla Tricoli Rodríguez	Sugarcane crop	Aileen González	

=== Miss Puerto Rico Universe (1999–2002) ===
From 1999 to 2002, the TeleOnce television station held the Miss Universe franchise under the name of "Miss Puerto Rico Universe. Producer Francisco "Paquitín" Cordero and his wife, model agent Itza Cordero, acted as national directors.

Year	MU ed.		Titleholder	National costume	Designer	Ref(s)
Year	MU ed.	No.	Name	National costume	Designer	Ref(s)
2002	51st	48th	Isis Marie Casalduc González	Traditional jíbara	Lisa Thon	
2001	50th	47th	Denise Marie Quiñones August	Gamecock	Unknown	
2000	49th	46th	Zoraida Isabel "Zoribel" Fonalledas Ferraiouli	Maga flower	Carlota Alfaro	
1999	48th	45th	Brenda Liz López Ramos	Harlequin butterfly	Unknown	

=== Miss Universe Puerto Rico (1996–1998) ===
From 1996 to 1998, the Telemundo Puerto Rico television station held the Miss Universe franchise under the name of "Miss Universe Puerto Rico." Francisco "Paquitín" Cordero and his wife Itza Cordero acted as national directors.

Year	MU ed.	Titleholder		National costume	Designer	Ref(s)
Year	MU ed.	No.	Name	National costume	Designer	Ref(s)
1998	47th	44th	Joyce Marie Giraud Mojica	Traditional jíbara	Unknown	
1997	46th	43rd	Ana Rosa Brito Suárez	Daughter of the Sea and Sun epithet	Angel López	
1996	45th	42nd	Sarybel Velilla Cabeza	El Yunque rainforest	Angel López	

=== Miss Puerto Rico (1962–1995) ===
From 1962 to 1995, the model agent Anna Santisteban held the Miss Universe franchise under the name of "Miss Puerto Rico." Santisteban also acted as national director.

Year	MU ed.	Titleholder		National costume	Designer	Ref(s)
Year	MU ed.	No.	Name	National costume	Designer	Ref(s)
1995	44th	41st	Desirée Louny Lowry Rodríguez	Vejigante character	Unknown	
1994	43rd	40th	Brenda Esther Robles Cortés	Pearl of the Caribbean epithet	Unknown	
1993	42nd	39th	Dayanara Torres Delgado	Cockfight	Ivan Gómez	
1992	41st	38th	Daisy García Rodríguez	Iguaca parrot (Note: Miss Puerto Rico 1990 María Luisa Fortuño Cosimi and Miss Puerto Rico 1992 Daisy García Rodríguez wore the same national costume at Miss Universe inspired by the Iguaca parrot.)	Angel López	
1991	40th	37th	Lissette Marie Bouret Echevarría	Puerto Rico casinos	Unknown	
1990	39th	36th	María Luisa Fortuño Cosimi	Iguaca parrot	Angel López	
1989	38th	35th	Catalina María Villar Ruiz	Atlantic Ocean and Caribbean Sea	Angel López	
1988	37th	34th	Isabel Maria Pardo Cubeñas	Taíno cacique Mabodamaca	Angel López	
1987	36th	33rd	Laurie Tamara Simpson Rivera	Island of the Sun epithet	Angel López	
1986	35th	32nd	Elizabeth Robison Latalladi	Island of the Sun epithet	Angel López	
1985	34th	31st	Deborah Fátima Carthy Deu	Indigenous Taína	Angel López	
1984	33rd	30th	Sandra Beauchamp Roche	Island of the Sun epithet	Roberto París	
1983	32nd	29th	Carmen Batiz Vergara	Maga flower (Note: Miss Puerto Rico 1981 Carmen Lotti Rodríguez, Miss Puerto Rico 1982 Lourdes Milagros Mantero Hormazábal, and Miss Puerto Rico 1983 Carmen Batiz Vergara wore the same national costume at Miss Universe inspired by the Maga flower.)	Iris Fagundo	
1982	31st	28th	Lourdes Milagros Mantero Hormazábal	Maga flower	Iris Fagundo	
1981	30th	27th	Carmen Lotti Rodríguez	Maga flower	Iris Fagundo	
1980	29th	26th	Agnes Tañón Correa	Traditional jíbara	Carlota Alfaro	
1979	28th	25th	Audrey Teresa "Tere" López Hernández	Amapola flower	Fernando Pena and Gladys Sorrentino	
1978	27th	24th	Ada Cecille Perkins Flores	Gamecock	Carlota Alfaro and Gladys Sorrentino	
1977	26th	23rd	Maria Del Mar Rivera Veglio	Pearl of the Caribbean epithet	Olga Prosper and Carmelita Guerrero	
1976	25th	22nd	Elizabeth Zayas Ortiz	Spanish conquistador	Unknown	
1975	24th	21st	Lorell Del Carmen Carmona Juan	Yagrumo tree	Unknown	
1974	23rd	20th	Sonia María Stege Chardón	Traditional jíbara	Fernando Pena	
1973	22nd	19th	Gladys Vanessa Colón Díaz	Pearl of the Caribbean epithet	Rafael Mojena	
1972	21st	18th	Bárbara Idelisse Torres Viñolo	Pearl of the Caribbean epithet	Unknown	
1971	20th	17th	Idalia Margarita "Beba" Franco Cantino	Gamecock	Fernando Pena	
1970	19th	16th	Marisol Malaret Contreras	Pearl of the Caribbean epithet	Wilbert Pagán	
1969	18th	15th	Aida Concepción "Aidita" Betancourt Barreto	Puerto Rico (the Sun, Caribbean Sea, and palm trees)	Fernando Pena	
1968	17th	14th	Marylene Carrasquillo Toro	Traditional jíbara	Carlota Alfaro	
1967	16th	13th	Ivonne Coll Mendoza	Traditional jíbara	Carlota Alfaro	
1966	15th	12th	Carol Bajandas	Traditional jíbara	Carlota Alfaro	
1965	14th	11th	Gloria Mercedes Cobián Díaz	Traditional jíbara	Carlota Alfaro	
1964	13th	10th	Yolanda Rodríguez Machín	Traditional jíbara	Carlota Alfaro	
1963	12th	9th	Jeanette Biascoechea Rodríguez	Traditional jíbara	Carlota Alfaro	
1962	11th	8th	Ana Celia Sosa Arce	Traditional jíbara	Carlota Alfaro	

=== Miss Puerto Rico (1961) ===
In 1961, the Puerto Rican League Against Cancer held Miss Universe franchise under the name of "Miss Puerto Rico." Tony Beacon acted as director of the pageant, while Anna Santisteban acted as trainer of the contestants.

Year	MU ed.	Titleholder		National costume	Designer	Ref(s)
Year	MU ed.	No.	Name	National costume	Designer	Ref(s)
1961	10th	7th	María Enid "Enid" Del Valle Pérez	Traditional jíbara (Note: Miss Puerto Rico 1961 María Enid "Enid" Del Valle Pérez wore three national costumes at Miss Universe. Two were inspired by the jíbara. One was made by designer Rafaela Santos. The other featured the blouse made by Santos with a skirt made by Enid, which she wore during the welcoming parade of the pageant. Enid wore a third costume inspired by palm trees during the final night of the pageant. It was made by an unknown Cuban designer from Miami.)	Rafaela Santos and Enid Del Valle	

=== None (1958–1960) ===
From 1958 to 1960, the Miss Universe franchise remained unclaimed in Puerto Rico. As a result, no pageant was held and titleholder crowned. Puerto Rico was absent from the international competition.

Year	MU ed.	Titleholder		National costume	Designer	Ref(s)
Year	MU ed.	No.	Name	National costume	Designer	Ref(s)
1960	9th	None, as no pageant was held and titleholder crowned in 1958, 1959, and 1960.				
1959	8th	None, as no pageant was held and titleholder crowned in 1958, 1959, and 1960.				
1958	7th	None, as no pageant was held and titleholder crowned in 1958, 1959, and 1960.				

=== Miss El Imparcial (1957) ===
In 1957, the El Imparcial newspaper held the Miss Universe franchise under the name of "Miss El Imparcial." Miguel Angel Yumet acted as national director.

Year	MU ed.	Titleholder		National costume	Designer	Ref(s)
Year	MU ed.	No.	Name	National costume	Designer	Ref(s)
1957	6th		María del Pilar "Mapita" Mercado Cordero	Traditional jíbara	Rafaela Santos	

=== Miss Puerto Rico Beauty (1956) ===
In 1956, the Puerto Rico Psychopedagogical Institute held the Miss Universe franchise under the name of "Miss Puerto Rico Beauty." Miguel Angel Yumet acted as national director.

Year	MU ed.	Titleholder		National costume	Designer	Ref(s)
Year	MU ed.	No.	Name	National costume	Designer	Ref(s)
1956	5th		Francisca "Paquita" Vivo Colón	Traditional jíbara (Note: Miss Puerto Rico 1955 Carmen Laura Betancourt Burgos and Miss Puerto Rico 1956 Francisca "Paquita" Vivo Colón wore the same national costume at Miss Universe inspired by the jíbara.)	Sylvette de Aldrey	

=== Miss El Imparcial (1953–1955) ===
From 1953 to 1955, the El Imparcial newspaper held the Miss Universe franchise under the name of "Miss El Imparcial." Miguel Angel Yumet acted as national director.

Year	MU ed.	Titleholder		National costume	Designer	Ref(s)
Year	MU ed.	No.	Name	National costume	Designer	Ref(s)
1955	4th		Carmen Laura Betancourt Burgos	Traditional jíbara	Sylvette de Aldrey	
1954	3rd		Belinda "Lucy" Santiago Nazario	Traditional jíbara	Genoveva Vázquez	
1953	2nd		Wanda Irizarry Antonmattei	Spanish Maja	Unknown (Note: Miss El Imparcial 1953 Wanda Irizarry Antonmattei wore a national costume inspired by the Spanish Maja. The designers of the dress and accessories are unknown. Like her predecessor, she wore the mantilla and abanico belonging to San Juan Mayor Felisa Rincón de Gautier.)	

=== Miss Borinquen (1952) ===
In 1952, Weldon Farms, producers of Leche Alba (Milk Alba), and the El Imparcial newspaper held the Miss Universe franchise under the name of "Miss Borinquen." Miguel Angel Yumet acted as national director.

Year	MU ed.	Titleholder		National costume	Designer	Ref(s)
Year	MU ed.	No.	Name	National costume	Designer	Ref(s)
1952	1st		María Ileana "Marilia" Levy Bernal	Spanish Maja	Unknown (Note: Miss Borinquen 1952 María Ileana "Marilia" Levy Bernal wore a national costume inspired by the Spanish Maja. The designers of the dress and accessories are unknown. The mantilla, peineta, and abanico were lent by San Juan Mayor Felisa Rincón de Gautier.)	

== Statistics ==
=== Miss Universe ===
==== Positions ====
This list includes the placements, unplacements, and absences of Miss Universe Puerto Rico in the international competition.

Position	Total	Year(s)
Miss Universe	5	1970, 1985, 1993, 2001, 2006
1st Runner-up	2	2005, 2019
2nd Runner-up	2	1998, 2004
3rd Runner-up	1	1971
4th Runner-up	2	1987, 2009
Top 5/6	4	1995, 2018, 2022, 2023
Top 9/10/12	10	1974, 1980, 1986, 1997, 1999, 2010, 2020, 2021, 2024, 2025
Top 13/15/16/20/21/30	2	2011, 2013
Placements	28	
Unplaced	43	1952–1957, 1961-1969, 1972, 1973, 1975–1979, 1981–1984, 1988–1992, 1994, 1996, 2000, 2002, 2003, 2007, 2008, 2012, 2014–2017
Participations	71	
Absent	3	1958–1960
Editions	74	

==== Placement streaks ====
This list includes the placement streaks, or continuous placements lasting at least two years, of Miss Universe Puerto Rico in the international competition.

Period	Total	Year(s)
2018–ongoing	8	2018, 2019, 2020, 2021, 2022, 2023, 2024, 2025
2009–2011	3	2009, 2010, 2011
2003–2006	3	2004, 2005, 2006
1997–1999	3	1997, 1998, 1999
1985–1987	3	1985, 1986, 1987
1970–1971	2	1970, 1971

==== National costumes ====
This list includes the national costumes of Miss Universe Puerto Rico in the international competition by source of inspiration.

Inspiration			Total	Year(s)
Broad	Main	Specific	Total	Year(s)
Culture	Jíbaro	Jíbara	17	1954–1957, 1961–1968, 1974, 1980, 1998, 2002, 2024
Culture	Epithet	Pearl of the Caribbean	6	1970, 1972, 1973, 1977, 1994, 2005
Culture	Epithet	Island of the Sun	3	1984, 1986, 1987
Culture	Epithet	Daughter of the Sea and Sun	1	1997
Culture	Taíno	Deity	2	2006, 2012
Culture	Taíno	Taína	2	1985, 2008
Culture	Taíno	Petroglyph	1	2004
Culture	Taíno	Cacique	1	1988
Culture	Sport	Cockfighting	4	1971, 1978, 1993, 2001
Culture	Sport	Boxing	1	2009
Culture	Spanish	Maja	2	1952, 1953
Culture	Spanish	Conquistador	1	1976
Culture	Folklore	Vejigante	2	1995, 2011
Culture	Music	Bomba	1	2021
Culture	Music	Danza	1	2014
Culture	Individual	Walter Mercado	1	2020
Culture	Individual	Roberto Cofresí	1	2007
Culture	Festival	SanSe	1	2023
Culture	Emblem	Coat of arms	1	2016
Culture	Architecture	Creole tiles	1	2015
Culture	Agriculture	Sugarcane	1	2003
Nature	Flower	Maga	5	1981–1983, 2000, 2019
Nature	Flower	Amapola	1	1979
Nature	Bird	Iguaca	2	1990, 1992
Nature	Bird	Zumbador	1	2025
Nature	Habitat	El Yunque	2	1996, 2010
Nature	Habitat	Puerto Rico	1	1969
Nature	Tree	Flamboyán	1	2017
Nature	Tree	Yagrumo	1	1975
Nature	Waterbody	Bioluminescent bay	1	2013
Nature	Waterbody	Atlantic Ocean and Caribbean Sea	1	1989
Nature	Plant	Moriviví	1	2026
Nature	Event	Hurricane Maria	1	2018
Nature	Insect	Harlequin butterfly	1	1999
Science	Astronomy	Arecibo Telescope	1	2022
Leisure	Casinos	Puerto Rico casinos	1	1992
Total			72	

=== Miss Universe Puerto Rico ===
==== Editions and titleholders ====
This list includes the number of editions and titleholders of Miss Universe Puerto Rico.

Edition	Total	Titleholder	Total	Year(s)
1st–6th	6	1st–6th	6	1952–1957
None (Note: No edition was held or titleholder crowned, as the Miss Universe franchise remained unclaimed. Puerto Rico was absent from the international competition.)	—N/a	None	—N/a	1958–1960
7th–32nd	26	7th–32nd	26	1961–1986
None (Note: Titleholder was appointed. No edition of the pageant was held in 1987 and 2020.)	—N/a	33rd	1	1987
33rd–64th	32	34th–65th	32	1988–2019
None	—N/a	66th	1	2020
65th–70th	6	67th–72nd	6	2021–2026
Total	70	Total	72	

==== Titleholders by municipality ====
This list includes titleholders of Miss Universe Puerto Rico by the municipality they represented.

Municipality	Total	Year(s)
San Juan	10	1956, 1957, 1963, 1965, 1974, 1978, 1985, 1987, 1997, 2017
Santurce	7	1954, 1962, 1966, 1969, 1970, 1971, 1972
Guaynabo	5	1981, 1988, 1990, 2000, 2015
Salinas	4	1976, 1989, 2005, 2006
Lares	3	1952, 1999, 2001
Toa Alta	3	1991, 1993, 1996
Trujillo Alto	3	1955, 1964, 1983
San Sebastián	2	2020, 2026
Dorado	2	2008, 2025
Orocovis	2	1973, 2024
Fajardo	2	1967, 2022
Toa Baja	2	2014, 2019
Aguadilla	2	1961, 2016 (Note: The representative of the municipality of Isabela won the title of Miss Universe Puerto Rico in 2016. However, after her dethronement, the first runner-up, who was the representative of Aguadilla, assumed the title. As a result, Aguadilla is considered to be the winning municipality in 2016.)
Río Grande	2	2010, 2012
Corozal	2	1995, 2011
San Germán	2	1975, 1986
Mayagüez	2	1979, 1984
Río Piedras	2	1953, 1968
Patillas	1	2023
Loíza	1	2021
Rincón	1	2018
Arecibo	1	2013
Cabo Rojo	1	2009
Guayanilla	1	2007
Cidra	1	2004
Vieques	1	2003
Utuado	1	2002
Aguas Buenas	1	1998
Isabela	1	1994
Bayamón	1	1992
Juncos	1	1982
Caguas	1	1980
Ponce	1	1977
Total	72	

==== Top 5/6 finalists by municipality ====
This list includes the Top 5 or Top 6 finalists (including winner and runners-up) of Miss Universe Puerto Rico by the municipality they represented. (Note: It does not include the editions where the runners-up are unknown (1961, 1963, and 1975) and the editions where the municipality of a runner-up is unknown (1969 and 1970).)

Municipality	Total	Year(s)
San Juan	25	1956, 1957, 1963, 1965, 1969, 1970, 1972, 1974, 1977–1983, 1985, 1986, 1991, 1993, 1997, 2003–2005, 2009, 2016, 2017
Santurce	21	1954–1957, (Note: It includes the two runners-up representing the Miramar and Park Boulevard districts of Santurce in 1955.) 1962, (Note: It includes the two runners-up representing Santurce in 1962.) 1965, 1966, 1968–1972, (Note: It includes the three runners-up representing Santurce in 1971 and the two runners-up in 1972.) 1995, 2007–2009
Ponce	15	1966, 1972, 1973, 1976, 1977, 1980, 1981, 1995, 1999, 2000, 2003, 2006, 2017, 2018, 2025
Guaynabo	15	1978, 1979, 1981–1985, 1988–1991, 1997, 1998, 2000, 2005, 2015
Dorado	13	1992, 1996, 2003, 2006, 2008, 2016–2019, 2021, 2022, 2025
Río Piedras	13	1953–1955, 1957, (Note: It includes the runner-up representing the Hyde Park district of Río Piedras in 1957.) 1964-1966, 1968, (Note: It includes the two runners-up representing Río Piedras in 1968.) 1971, (Note: It includes the two runners-up representing Río Piedras in 1971.) 2006
Bayamón	11	1976, 1977, 1981, 1992, 1996, 1998, 2002, 2008, 2011, 2014, 2016
Trujillo Alto	11	1955, 1962, 1964, 1977, 1983, 1985, 1988, 1993, 1997, 2008, 2021
Mayagüez	11	1964, 1973, 1979, 1980, 1984, 1986, 1996, 1998, 2010, 2013, 2015
Carolina	9	1973, 1982, 1988, 1991, 2001, 2004, 2010, 2012, 2019
Lares	9	1952, 1981, 1990, 1991, 1993, 1997, 1999, 2001, 2004
Toa Alta	8	1990–1993, 1996, 2012, 2022, 2024
Toa Baja	8	1974, 1984, 1985, 2004, 2014, 2019, 2021, 2023
Cayey	8	1954, 1984, 1989, 2010, 2013–2015, 2019
Caguas	8	1956, 1957, 1976, 1980, 1983, 1994, 1998, 1999
Fajardo	7	1956, 1967, 1986, 1997, 2004, 2018, 2022
San Germán	7	1975, 1979, 1985, 1986, 1988, 1989, 2007
Aibonito	6	1973, 1986, 1995, 1996, 2017, 2026
Río Grande	6	1945, 2010, 2012, 2014, 2017, 2023
Isabela	6	1993, 1994, 1999, 2008, 2016, 2023
Añasco	5	1974, 1980, 2001, 2014, 2026
Orocovis	5	1973, 1982, 1990, 2013, 2024
Salinas	5	1976, 1989, 2005, 2006, 2024
Utuado	5	1995, 2000, 2002, 2008, 2015
Aguas Buenas	4	1998, 2012, 2015, 2026
Aguadilla	4	1961, 1994, 2016, 2022
Cataño	4	1984, 2000, 2009, 2022
Loíza	4	1974, 1989, 2005, 2021
Humacao	4	1983, 1992, 2011, 2015
Arroyo	3	2012, 2013, 2026
Corozal	3	1995, 2011, 2024
San Lorenzo	3	2002, 2021, 2023
Villalba	3	1994, 2004, 2021
Arecibo	3	1974, 2013, 2018
Barranquitas	3	2003, 2005, 2007
Lajas	3	1978, 1992, 2006
San Sebastián	2	2019, 2026
Patillas	2	2007, 2023
Vieques	2	2003, 2025
Vega Baja	2	2009, 2018
Rincón	2	1996, 2018
Guayama	2	2001, 2016
Juana Díaz	2	1998, 2014
Gurabo	2	1990, 2011
Hatillo	2	1979, 2010
Cabo Rojo	2	1978, 2009
Adjuntas	2	1972, 2009
Coamo	2	2005, 2007
Guayanilla	2	1976, 2007
Santa Isabel	2	2002, 2003
Manatí	2	1977, 1997
Jayuya	1	2025
Canóvanas	1	2025
Camuy	1	2019
Aguada	1	2012
Ciales	1	2011
Yauco	1	2006
Cidra	1	2004
Morovis	1	2002
Ceiba	1	2001
Naranjito	1	2000
Luquillo	1	1994
Quebradillas	1	1988
Juncos	1	1982
Sabana Grande	1	1978
Total	322	

==== Top 5/6 finalists multiple times ====
This list includes returning contestants of Miss Universe Puerto Rico who have achieved a Top 5 or Top 6 placement more than once. (Note: It does not include the editions where the runners-up are unknown (1961, 1963, and 1975).)

Name	Rep.	Position	Year(s)	Span
Génesis María Dávila Pérez	Arroyo	1st runner-up	2026	13
Génesis María Dávila Pérez	Arroyo	1st runner-up	2013	13
Nicole Marie Colón Rivera	Aibonito	3rd runner-up	2026	11
Nicole Marie Colón Rivera	Cayey	2nd runner-up	2015	11
Jennifer Colón Alvarado	Orocovis	Winner	2024	15
Jennifer Colón Alvarado	San Juan	1st runner-up	2009	15
Ivana Carolina Irizarry Fritany	Lares	3rd runner-up	2024	7
Ivana Carolina Irizarry Fritany	Río Grande	4th runner-up	2017	7
Heilymar Rosario Velázquez	Toa Baja	Top 6	2021	5
Heilymar Rosario Velázquez	San Juan	2nd runner-up	2016	5
Alexandra Porrata Montalvo	Ponce	2nd runner-up	2018	4
Alexandra Porrata Montalvo	Juana Díaz	3rd runner-up	2014	4
Larissa Santiago Escazo	Fajardo	Top 6	2018	4
Larissa Santiago Escazo	Río Grande	5th runner-up	2014	4
Stephanie Román De León	Dorado	5th runner-up	2016	5
Stephanie Román De León	Bayamón	1st runner-up	2011	5
Gabriela Berríos Pagán	Toa Baja	Winner	2014	2
Gabriela Berríos Pagán	Toa Alta	2nd runner-up	2012	2
Desirée Del Río De Jesús	Cayey	2nd runner-up	2013	2
Desirée Del Río De Jesús	Ciales	3rd runner-up	2011	2
Wilmadilis "Uma" Blasini Pérez	Guayanilla	Winner	2007	2
Wilmadilis "Uma" Blasini Pérez	San Juan	5th runner-up	2005	2
Yara Liz Lasanta Santiago	Barranquitas	2nd runner-up	2007	2
Yara Liz Lasanta Santiago	Barranquitas	4 runner-up	2005	2
Cynthia Enid Olavarría Rivera	Salinas	Winner	2005	2
Cynthia Enid Olavarría Rivera	San Juan	1st runner-up	2003	2
Mónica Liz Candelaria Pou	Coamo	1st runner-up	2005	3
Mónica Liz Candelaria Pou	Bayamón	Top 5	2002	3
Brenda Liz López Ramos	Lares	Winner	1999	2
Brenda Liz López Ramos	Lares	1st runner-up	1997	2
Ana Rosa Brito Suárez	San Juan	Winner	1997	6
Ana Rosa Brito Suárez	San Juan	2nd runner-up	1991	6
Blanca Sáez	Abonito	Top 6	1996	1
Blanca Sáez	Abonito	4th runner-up	1995	1
Miriam López Piñeiro	Río Piedras	1st runner-up	1971	3
Miriam López Piñeiro	Río Piedras	2nd runner-up	1968	3
Yolanda Rodríguez Machín	Trujillo Alto	Winner	1964	2
Yolanda Rodríguez Machín	Trujillo Alto	2nd runner-up	1962	2

==== Top 5/6 finalists winners of special awards ====
This list includes contestants of Miss Universe Puerto Rico who have achieved a Top 5 or Top 6 placement and won a main special award, namely Miss Photogenic and Miss Congeniality. (Note: It does not include the editions where the special awardees are completely or partially unknown (1961, 1971, 1974, 1975, 1977, 1979, 1980, 1982–1984, 2003–2006).)

Name	Rep.	Position	Award	Year(s)
Viviane Díaz Arroyo	Aguas Buenas	2nd runner-up	Miss Photogenic	2026
Isys Santos Crespo	Vieques	2nd runner-up	Miss Photogenic	2025
Stephanie Ríos Vélez	Toa Alta	4th runner-up	Miss Photogenic	2024
Laihany Pontón Ortiz	Bayamón	3rd runner-up	Miss Photogenic	2016
Nivializ Pérez Hernández	Aguas Buenas	1st runner-up	Miss Photogenic	2015
Stephanie Soto Ríos	Añasco	2nd runner-up	Miss Photogenic	2014
Monic Pérez Díaz	Arecibo	Winner	Miss Photogenic	2013
Nadyalee Torres López	Aguas Buenas	4th runner-up	Miss Photogenic	2012
Ingrid Rivera Santos	Dorado	Winner	Miss Photogenic	2008
Veronica Santiago	San Germán	4th runner-up	Miss Photogenic	2007
María De Lourdes Díaz	Santurce	5th runner-up	Miss Congeniality	2007
Zoribel Fonalledas Ferraiouli	Guaynabo	Winner	Miss Photogenic	2000
Miredys Peguero	Isabela	1st runner-up	Miss Photogenic	1999
Ana Rosa Brito Suárez	San Juan	Winner	Miss Photogenic	1997
Blanca Sáez	Aibonito	Top 6	Miss Photogenic	1996
Desirée Lowry Rodríguez	Corozal	Winner	Miss Photogenic	1995
Lianabel Rosario	Toa Baja	1st runner-up	Miss Photogenic	1993
Tania Collazo Barreiro	Orocovis	1st runner-up	Miss Photogenic	1990
Sandra Lugo	San Germán	3rd runner-up	Miss Photogenic	1989
Lucy Lawton	Carolina	1st runner-up	Miss Photogenic	1988
Elizabeth Robison Latalladi	San Germán	Winner	Miss Photogenic	1986
Sandra Brignoni	Toa Baja	4th runner-up	Miss Photogenic	1985
Norma Copeland	Bayamón	1st runner-up	Miss Photogenic	1981
Patricia Mercado	Mayagüez	1st runner-up	Miss Photogenic	1980
Maria Del Mar Rivera Veglio	Ponce	Winner	Miss Photogenic	1977
Elizabeth Zayas Ortiz	Salinas	Winner	Miss Photogenic	1976
Gladys Vanessa Colón Díaz	Orocovis	Winner	Miss Photogenic	1973
Lourdes Balasquide Pérez	Río Piedras	3rd runner-up	Miss Congeniality	1955

==== Host locations ====
This list includes the host municipalities and venues of Miss Universe Puerto Rico editions.

Municipality	Venue	Type	Total	Year(s)
San Juan	Centro de Bellas Artes Luis A. Ferré	Auditorium	21	1998-2005, 2008, 2010, 2012–2014, 2016–2019, 2021–2025
San Juan	El San Juan Hotel & Casino	Ballroom	6	1968, 1969, 1986, 1988–1990
San Juan	Centro de Convenciones del Condado	Ballroom	4	1996, 1977–1979
San Juan	San Jerónimo Hilton Hotel (Note: It was the venue of Miss Puerto Rico 1964 under the name of Holiday Inn Hotel.)	Ballroom	4	1964–1966, 1972
San Juan	Escambrón Beach Club & Hotel	Ballroom	3	1955–1957
San Juan	Centro de Convenciones de Puerto Rico	Ballroom	2	2011, 2007
San Juan	Coliseo Roberto Clemente	Arena	2	1973, 1974
San Juan	Condado Beach Hotel	Ballroom	2	1952, 1953
San Juan	Coliseo José Miguel Agrelot	Arena	1	2009
San Juan	Muelle Panamericano I	Hangar	1	2006
San Juan	Parque Central	Field	1	1985
San Juan	Flamboyán Hotel & Casino	Ballroom	1	1971
San Juan	Puerto Rico-Sheraton Hotel	Ballroom	1	1970
San Juan	Americana Hotel	Ballroom	1	1967
San Juan	WAPA-TV	TV studio	1	1963
San Juan	La Concha Hotel	Ballroom	1	1962
San Juan	Caribe Hilton Hotel	Ballroom	1	1961
San Juan	Teatro Tapia	Auditorium	1	1954
Ponce	Teatro La Perla	Auditorium	2	1980, 1991
Ponce	Complejo Ferial de Puerto Rico Juan H. Cintrón	Ballroom	1	2015
Guaynabo	Teatro Cinema 4	Auditorium	2	1975, 1976
Guaynabo	Mets Pavilion	Arena	1	1984
Bayamón	Teatro Braulio Castillo	Auditorium	1	1998
Bayamón	Coliseo Rubén Rodríguez	Arena	1	1993
Mayagüez	Teatro Yagüez	Auditorium	1	1997
Mayagüez	Palacio de Recreación y Deportes	Arena	1	1995
Caguas	Centro de Bellas Artes Ángel O. Berríos	Auditorium	1	2026
Loíza	Sala de Actividades del Centro Vacacional UIA	Ballroom	1	1994
Toa Alta	Teatro Municipal	Auditorium	1	1992
Carolina	Polideportivo	Arena	1	1983
Juncos	Estadio Municipal	Arena	1	1982
San Germán	Centro de Convenciones	Ballroom	1	1981
Total			70	

==== Male presenters ====
This list includes the male presenters of Miss Universe Puerto Rico editions. (Note: It does not include the editions where the presenter and co-presenter are unknown (1963 to 1970).)

Name	Total	Year(s)
Pedro Zervigón	13	1981–1985, 1987–1995
Luis Vigoreaux	9	1971, 1973–1980
Raymond Arrieta	5	2007, 2012–2015
Braulio Castillo Jr.	5	1999–2002, 2009
Miguel Angel Yumet	5	1952, 1953, 1955–1957
José Santana	4	2023–2026
Jaime Mayol	4	2016–2019
Luisito Vigoreaux	2	2010, 2011
Jorge Rivera Nieves	2	1996, 1997
Julio Rivera-Saniel	1	2022
José Figueroa	1	2021
Rodolfo Jiménez	1	2009
Osvaldo Ríos	1	2008
Eddie Miró	1	2005
Manolo Cardona	1	2004
Rafael José	1	2003
Pedro Sevcec	1	1998
Edgardo Huertas	1	1986
Axel Anderson	1	1972
Raúl Degaldo Cué	1	1962
Tony Beacon	1	1961
José Luis Terregrosa	1	1954

==== Female presenters ====
This list includes the female presenters of Miss Universe Puerto Rico editions.

Name	Total	Year(s)
Estefanía Soto	3	2021–2023
Diane Ferrer	2	2024, 2025
Cynthia Olavarría	2	2018, 2019
Deborah Carthy-Deu	2	2005, 2006
Viviana Ortiz	1	2026
Zuleyka Rivera	1	2009
Desiree Lowry	1	2008
Alexandra Malagón	1	2007
Mara Croatto	1	2004
María Falcón	1	1986
Irma Delgado	1	1962

==== Onstage and mezzanine co-presenters ====
This list includes the on-stage and mezzanine co-presenters of Miss Universe Puerto Rico editions.

Name	Total	Year(s)
Anna Santisteban	23	1971–1986, 1988–1995
Desiree Lowry	7	1996, 1997, 1999–2002, 2017
Deborah Carthy-Deu	7	1989–1995
Bryan Villarini	6	2021–2026
Alexandra Fuentes	4	2012–2015
Catherine Castro	3	2024–2026
Diane Ferrer	3	2021–2023
Mara Croatto	3	1997–1999
Rashel Díaz	2	2010, 2011
Brenda Liz López	2	2001, 2006
Gilbert Mamery	2	1981, 1982
Natalia Rivera	1	2016
Mariana Vicente	1	2012
Cordelia González	1	2011
Zuleyka Rivera	1	2010
Zoribel Fonalledas	1	2006
Amelia Vega	1	2004
Carla Tricoli	1	2004
Maria Del Carmen González	1	2004
Denise Quiñones	1	2003
Isis Casalduc	1	2003
Nuria Sebazco	1	2002
Ana Rosa Brito	1	2000
Dagmar Rivera	1	1998
Carmen Batiz	1	1996
Cecilia Bolocco	1	1987
Marisol Malaret	1	1986
María Falcón	1	1985
Alfred D. Herger	1	1984
Carmen Jovet	1	1984
Erik Estrada	1	1979
Beba Franco	1	1976

==== Backstage co-presenters ====
This list includes the backstage co-presenters of Miss Universe Puerto Rico editions.

Name	Total	Year(s)
Nicole Chacón	4	2016–2019
Ashleybeth Pérez	3	2022–2024
Brenda Rivera	3	2022–2024
Ángel Laguer	2	2025, 2026
Zoe Nuñiz	2	2025, 2026
Neyra Alfonsina	2	2018, 2019
William Valdés	2	2018, 2019
Samarys Barbot	1	2026
Viviane Díaz Arroyo	1	2025
José Santana	1	2021
Yizette Cifredo	1	2021
Gil Marie López	1	2016
Yulianna Vargas	1	2016

== Gallery of titleholders ==
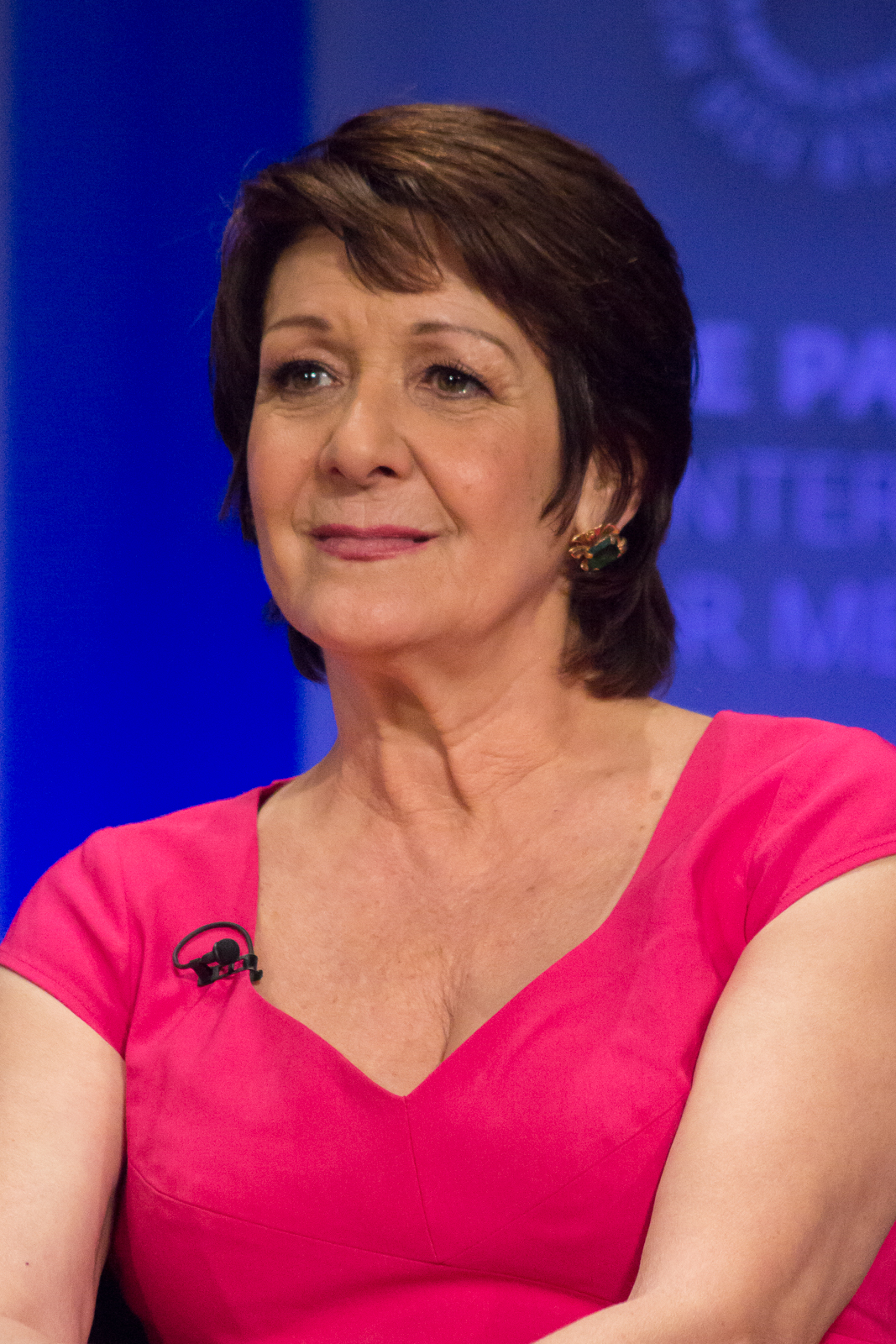
Ivonne Coll, Miss Puerto Rico 1967

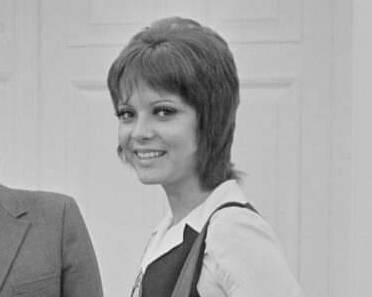
Marisol Malaret, Miss Puerto Rico 1970 and Miss Universe 1970

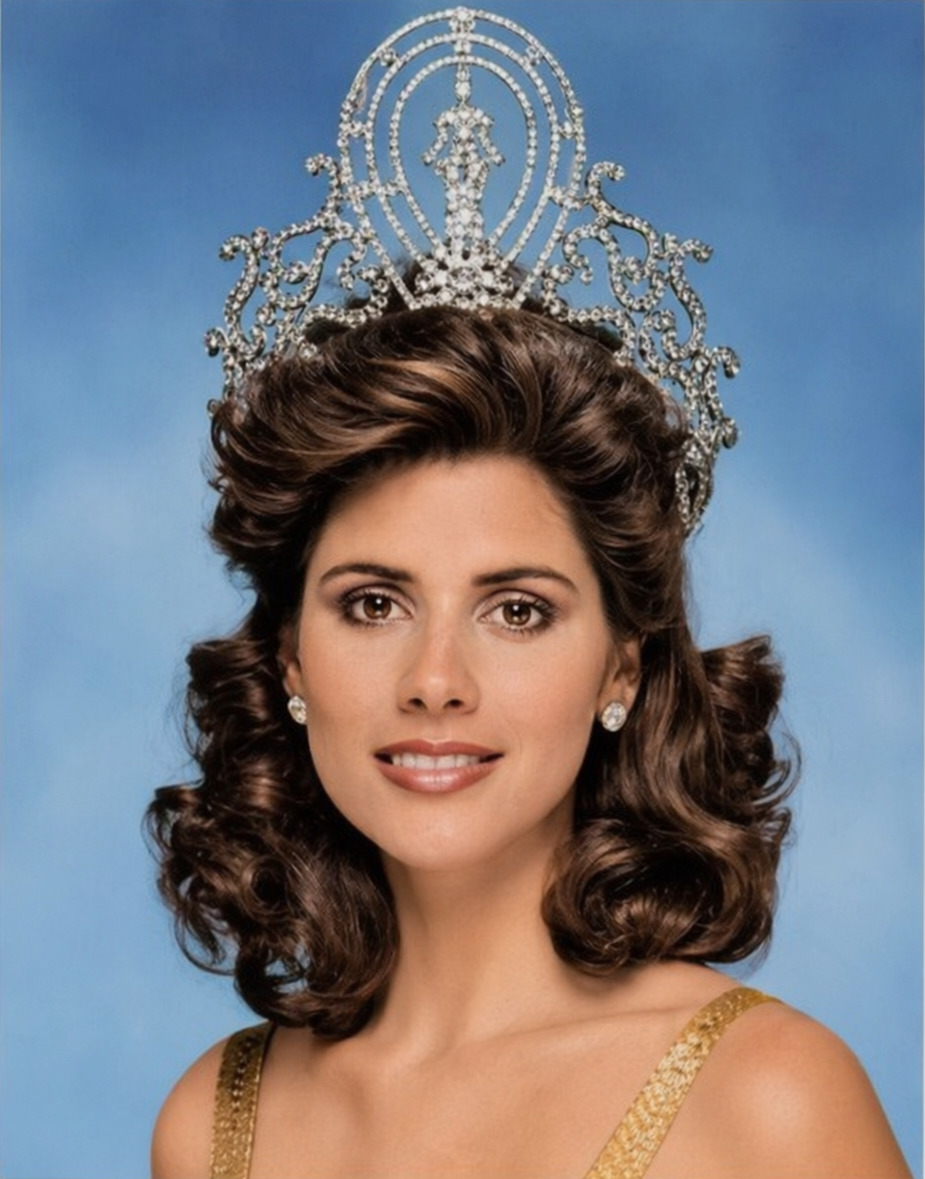
Deborah Carthy Deu, Miss Puerto Rico 1985 and Miss Universe 1985

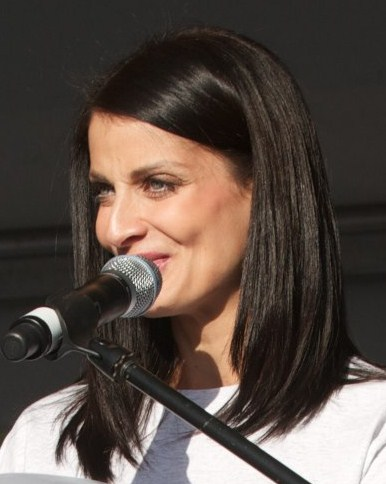
Dayanara Torres, Miss Puerto Rico 1993 and Miss Universe 1993

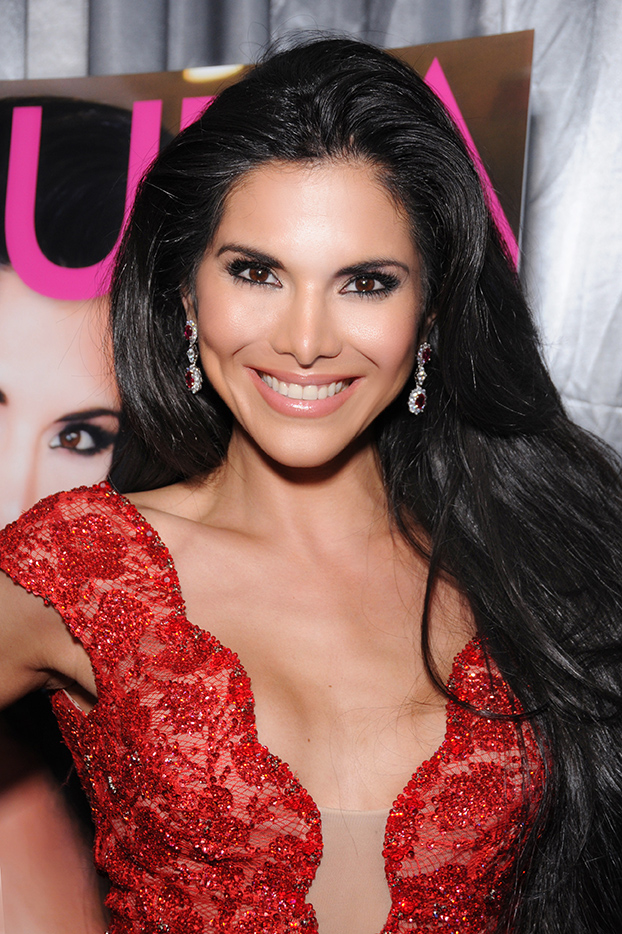
Joyce Giraud, Miss Universe Puerto Rico 1998 and 2nd Runner-up Miss Universe 1998

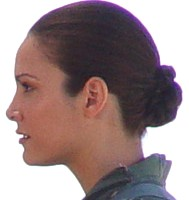
Denise Quiñones, Miss Puerto Rico Universe 2001 and Miss Universe 2001

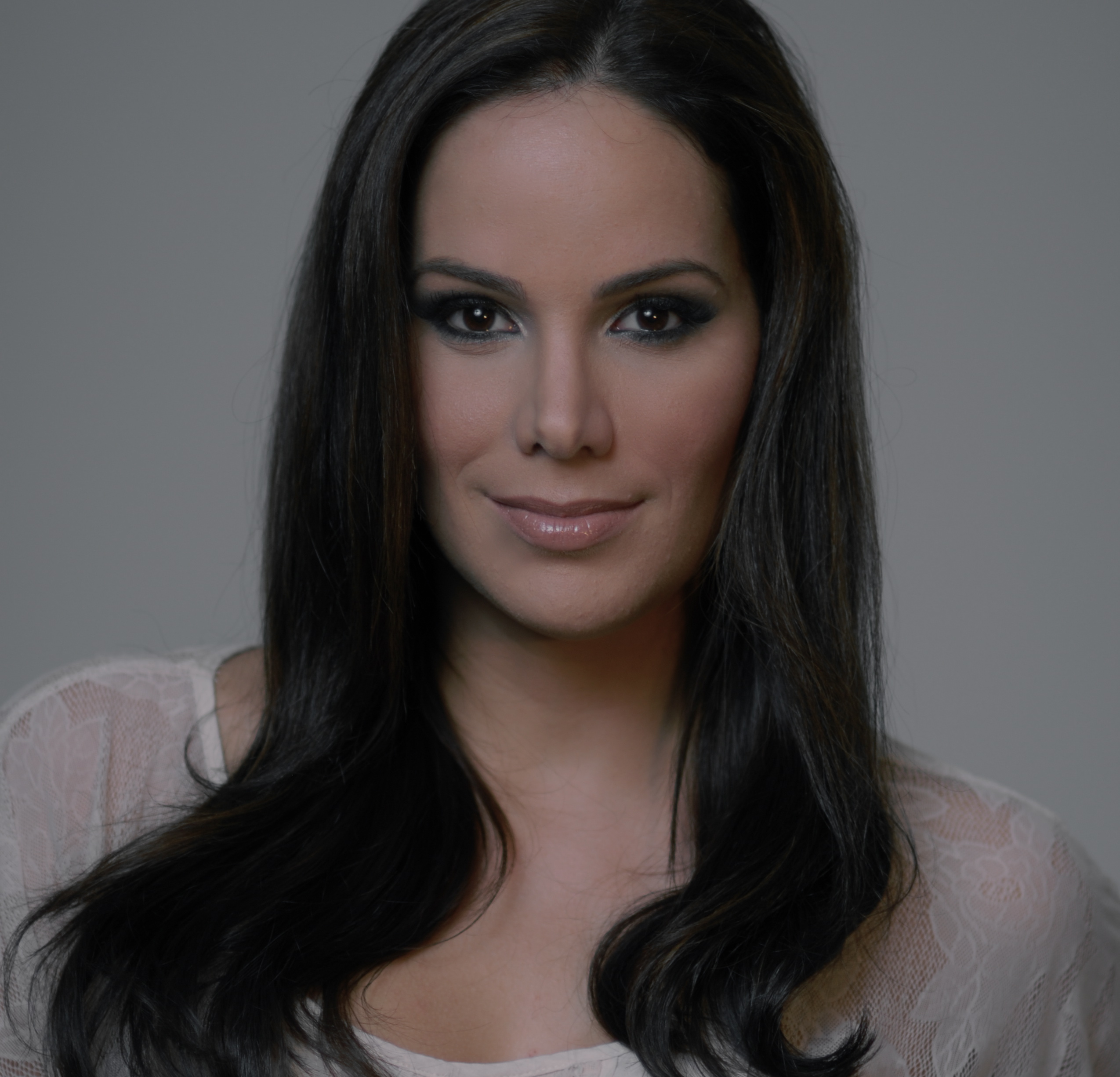
Isis Casalduc, Miss Puerto Rico Universe 2002

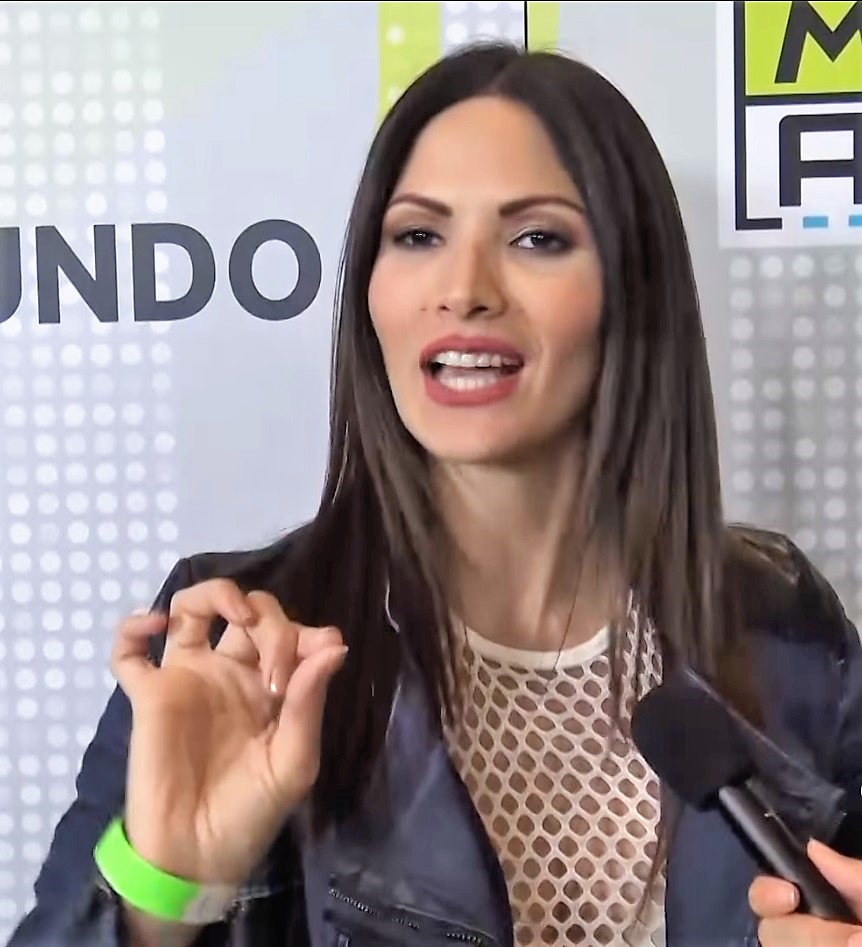
Cynthia Olavarría, Miss Puerto Rico Universe 2005 and 1st Runner-up Miss Universe 2005

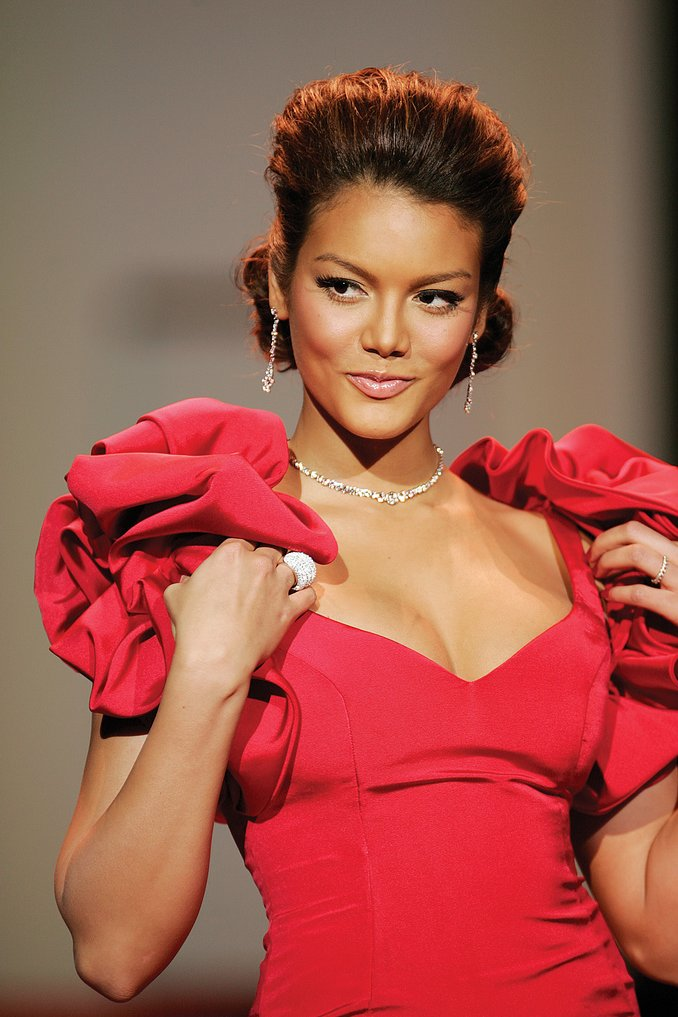
Zuleyka Rivera, Miss Puerto Rico Universe 2006 and Miss Universe 2006

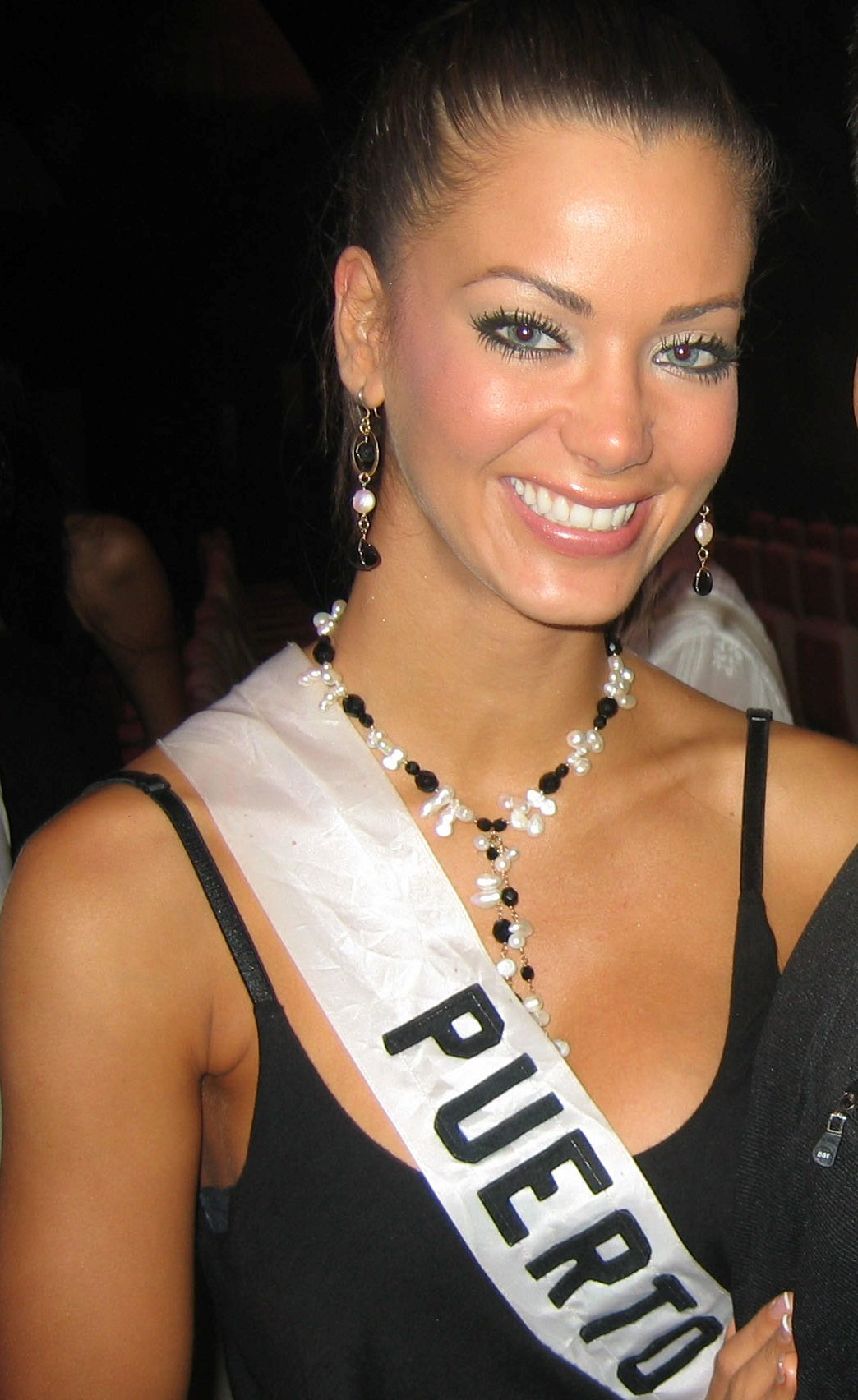
Ingrid Marie Rivera, Miss Puerto Rico Universe 2008

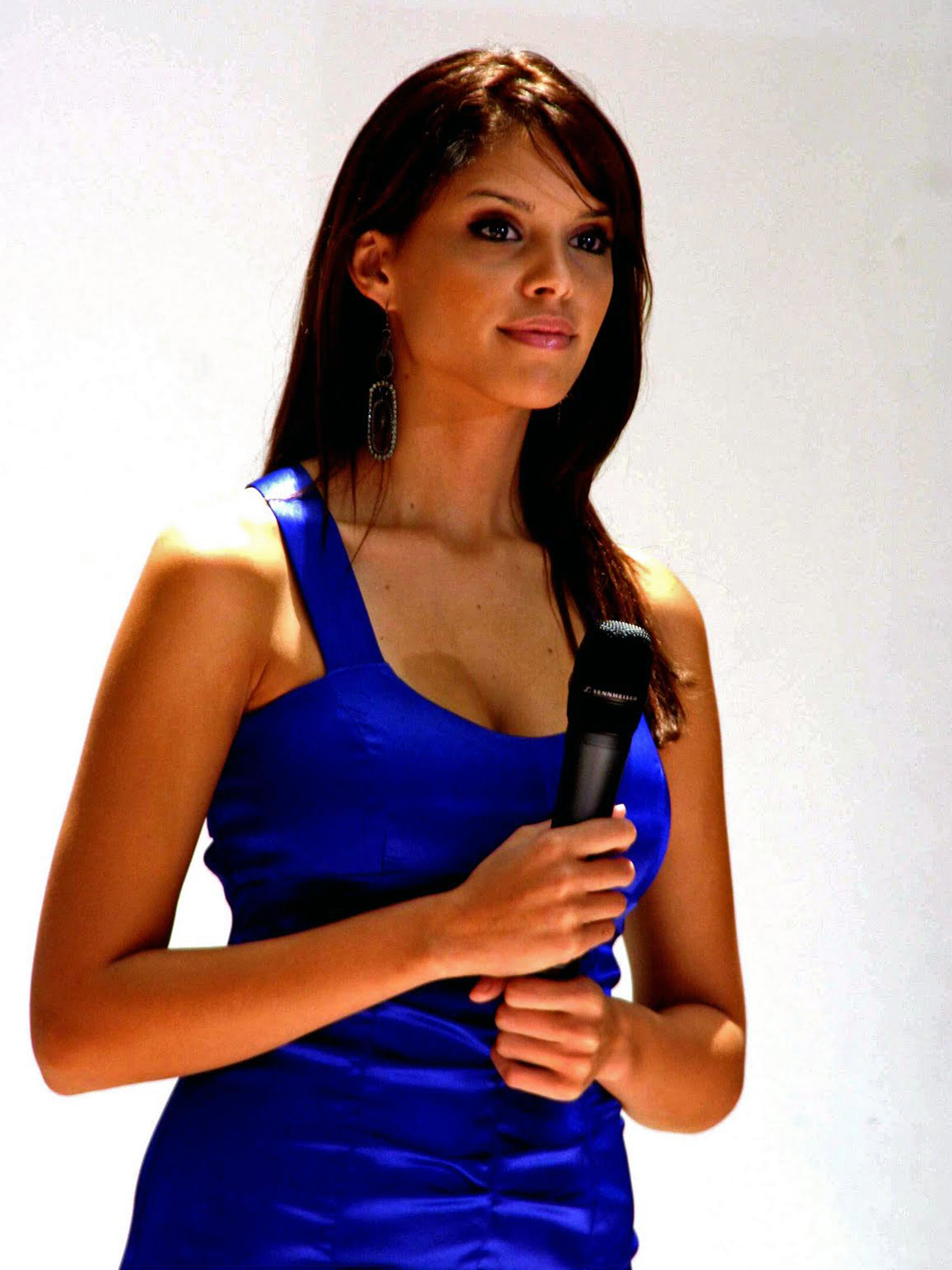
Mayra Matos, Miss Puerto Rico Universe 2009 and 4th Runner-up Miss Universe 2009

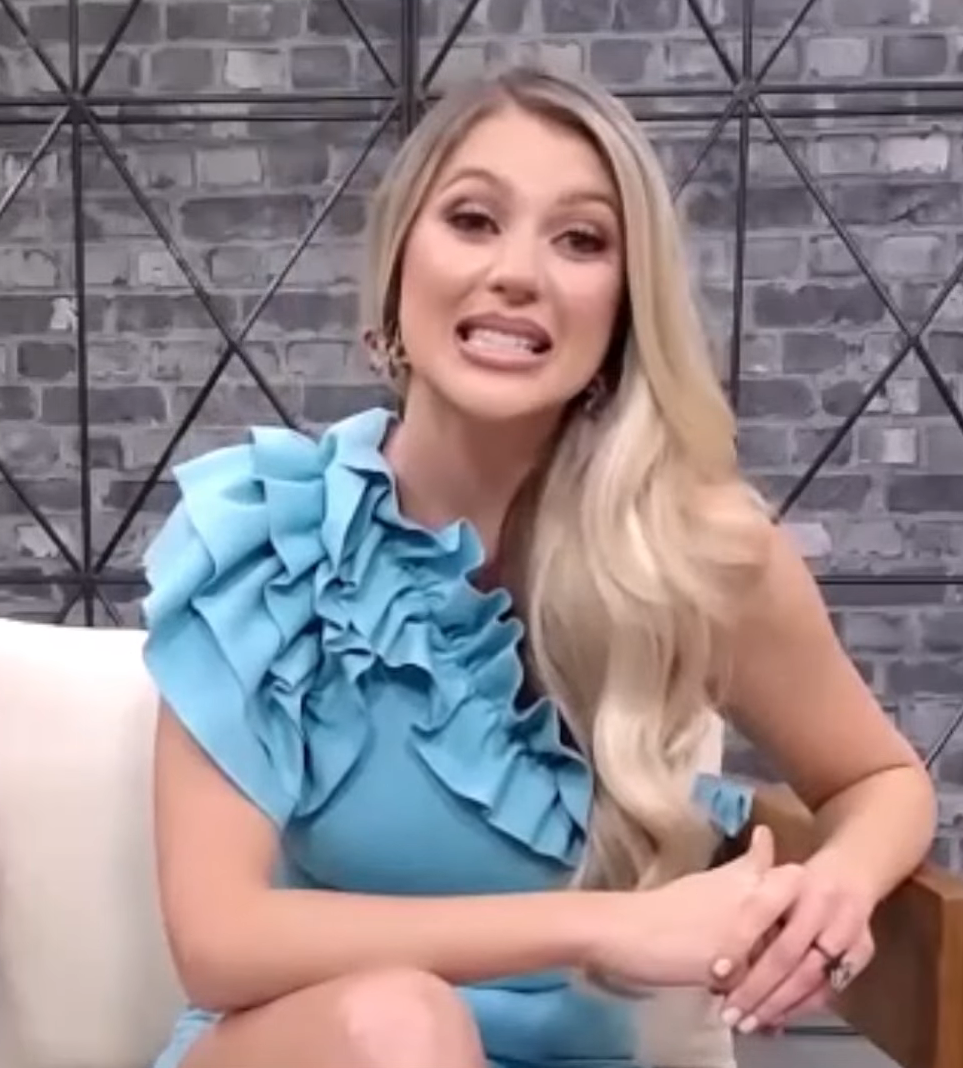
Madison Anderson, Miss Universe Puerto Rico 2019 and 1st Runner-up Miss Universe 2019

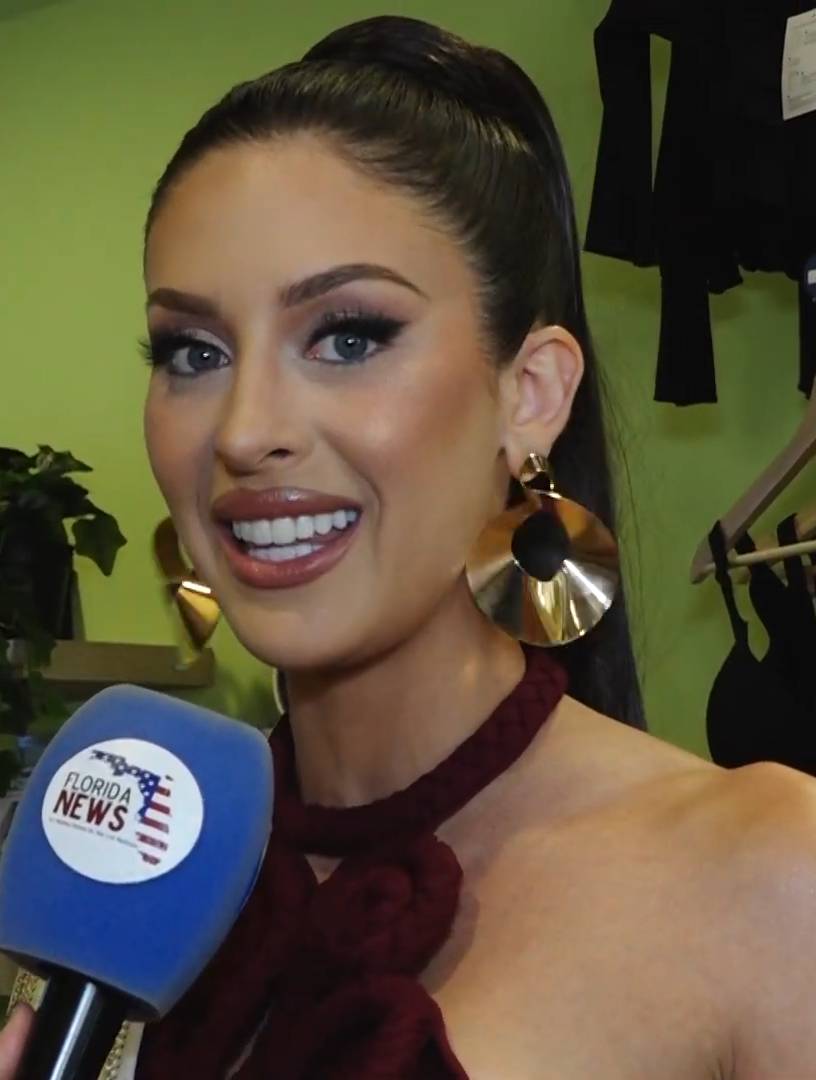
Jennifer Colón, Miss Universe Puerto Rico 2024 and Top 12 Miss Universe 2024

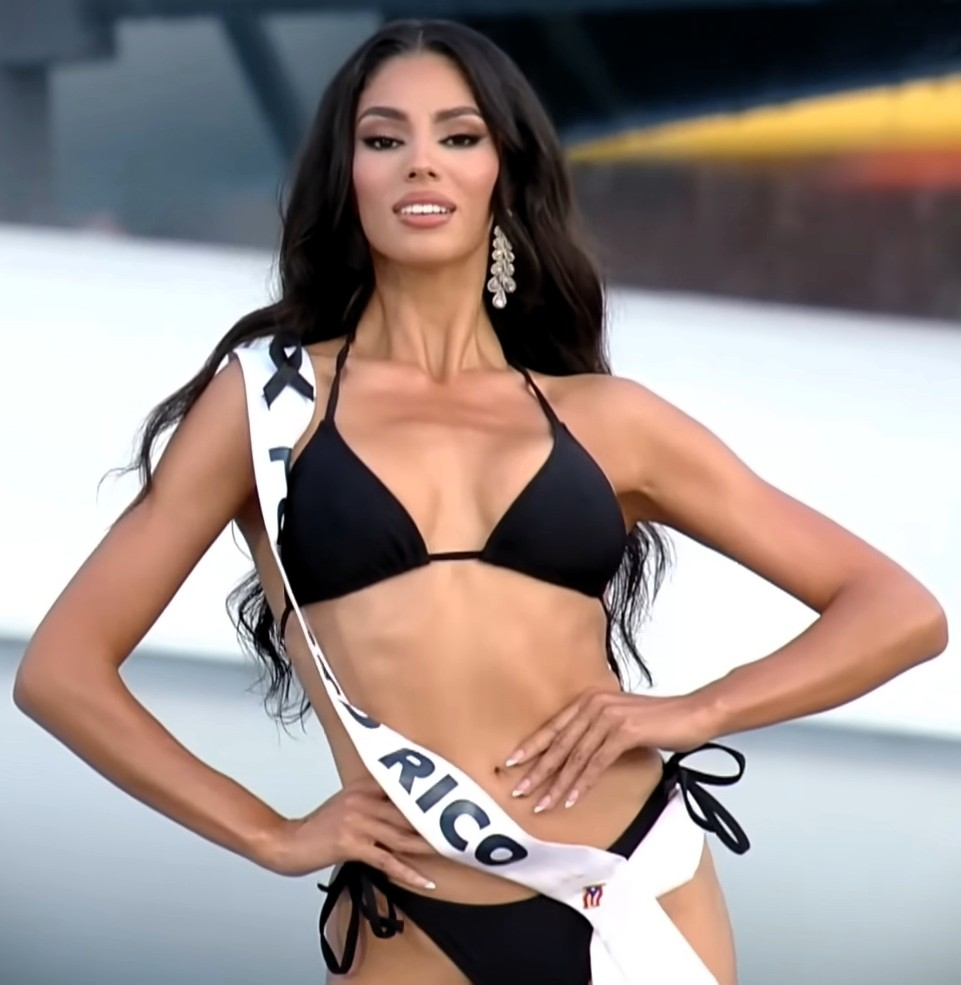
Zashely Alicea, Miss Universe Puerto Rico 2025 and Top 12 Miss Universe 2025

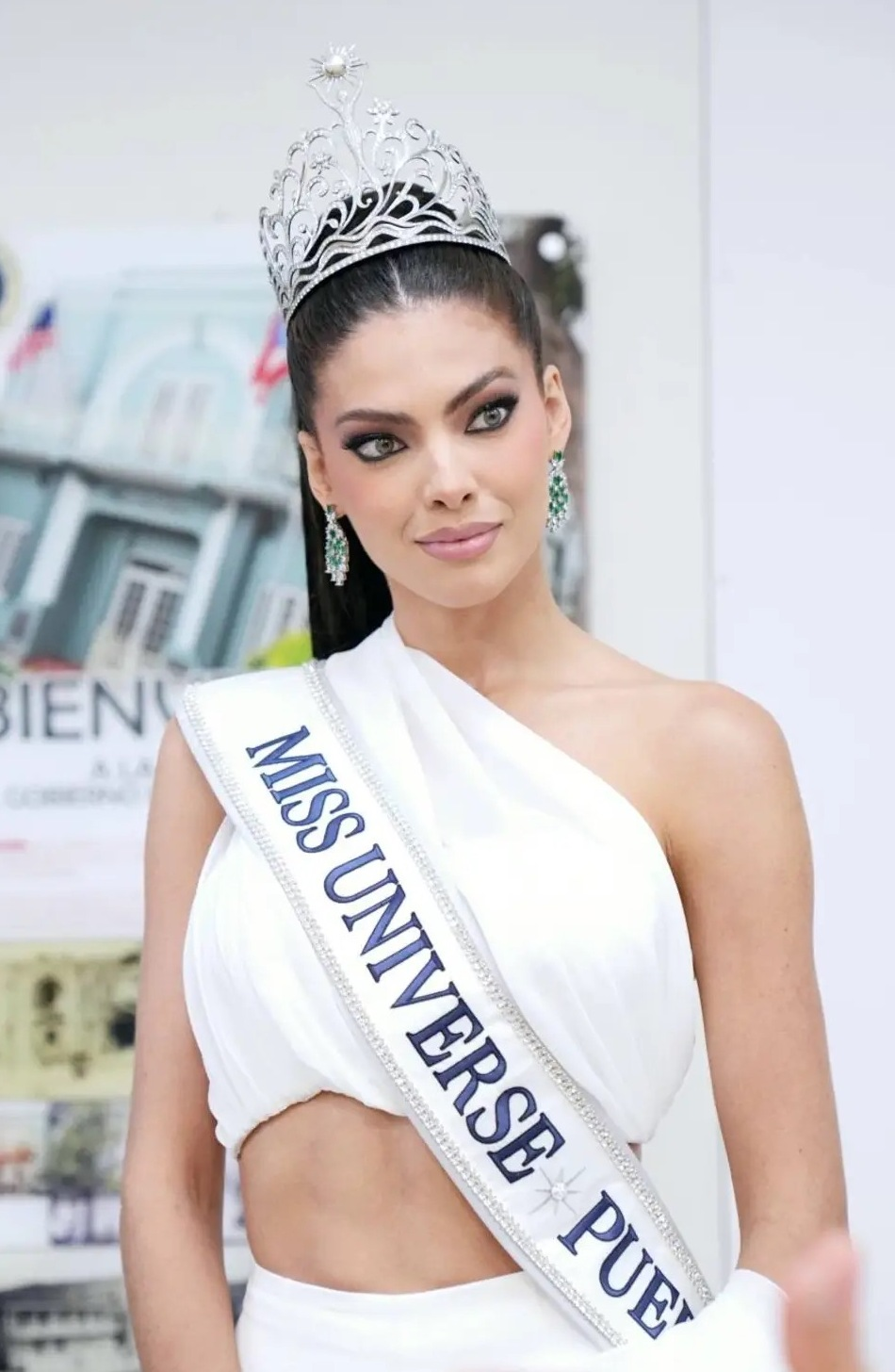
Jennifer Barreto, Miss Universe Puerto Rico 2026

== See also ==
- Miss Puerto Rico
