= Miss Universe Puerto Rico 2025 =

69th Miss Universe Puerto Rico

- Date: August 14, 2025
- Presenters: José Santana; Diane Ferrer
- Entertainment: Christian Daniel; Jowell
- Venue: Luis A. Ferré Performing Arts Center, Santurce, San Juan, Puerto Rico
- Broadcaster: WAPA-TV
- Entrants: 23
- Placements: 15
- Winner: Zashely Alicea; Dorado
- Personality: Heidi Marie Acevedo, Morovis
- Photogenic: Isys Santos, Vieques

Miss Universe Puerto Rico 2025 was the 69th Miss Universe Puerto Rico pageant, held at the Luis A. Ferré Performing Arts Center in San Juan, Puerto Rico, on August 14, 2025.

Jennifer Colón of Orocovis crowned her successor Zashely Alicea of Dorado at the end of the event. Alicea represented Puerto Rico at Miss Universe 2025 in Thailand, where she reached the Top 12.

== Results ==
=== Placements ===
Placement	Contestant
Miss Universe Puerto Rico 2025	Dorado – Zashely Alicea
1st runner-up	Jayuya – Samarys Barbot
2nd runner-up	Vieques – Isys Santos
3rd runner-up	Ponce – Marisabel Rivera
4th runner-up	Canóvanas – Aneichka Maldonado
Top 10	Carolina – Josuan Del Valle; Coamo – Natalia Gómez; Fajardo – Maria Amador; Lares – Bárbara Marrero; Trujillo Alto – Joaliz Cancel
Top 15	Caguas – Sofía Adorno; Salinas – Paola Malavé; San Sebastian – Kaelie Blanes-Ronda; Santa Isabel – Karina Alvarado; Toa Alta – Alanys Bravo

=== Special awards ===
Award	Winner	Ref.
Miss Photogenic	Vieques – Isys Santos	
Miss Personality	Morovis – Heidi Acevedo	
Total Look	Dorado – Zashely Alicea	
L´Oréal Most Beautiful Hair	Vieques – Isys Santos	
L´Oréal Most Radiant Skin	Ponce – Marisabel Rivera	
L´Oréal Mujer De Valor	Jayuya – Samarys Barbot	
Best Catwalk	Dorado – Zashely Alicea	
My Way Award	Carolina – Josuan del Valle	
Colgate Impactful Smile	Jayuya – Samarys Barbot	

== Contestants ==
Twenty-three contestants competed for the title of Miss Universe Puerto Rico 2025:

Municipality	Contestant	Age
Aguadilla	Natalie Marrero	30
Caguas	Sofía Adorno	26
Canóvanas	Aneichka Torres	24
Carolina	Josuan Del Valle Rivera	29
Cataño	Isabella Buford	21
Coamo	Natalia Rivera	24
Dorado	Zashely Alicea	25
Fajardo	Maria Rivera	29
Gurabo	Valeria Velázquez	25
Jayuya	Samarys Arroyo	28
Lares	Bárbara Rivera	32
Morovis	Heidi Rosario	34
Naguabo	Karielys Colón	21
Ponce	Marisabel Negrón	33
Rincón	Krystyn Barreiro	33
Salinas	Paola Morales	22
San Juan	Indira Ortiz	26
San Sebastian	Kaelie Blanes-Ronda	26
Santa Isabel	Karina Alvarado	40
Toa Alta	Alanys Bravo	22
Trujillo Alto	Joaliz Figueroa	29
Vieques	Isys Crespo	23
Yauco	Clauda Lorenzi	30

== Judges ==
- Zuleyka Rivera – Miss Universe 2006 and Miss Universe Puerto Rico 2006 from Salinas
- Adriana Luna – Veterinarian and content creator
- Jesús Cancel – Makeup artist
- Karla Guilfú – Miss Universe Puerto Rico 2023 from Patillas
- Zilka Ríos – Dietitian and health consultant
- Madesly Martínez – Marketing manager of Coca-Cola Puerto Rico Bottlers
- Walter Otero – Gallery owner
- Shirley Rodríguez – Co-founder of Mr. & Mrs. Entertainment
- David Antonio – Fashion designer
- Marie Tere Benes Lima – Businesswoman and professional model
- Isaac Demel – President of Lido Jewelers
- Normando Valentín – News anchor
