= Supervivientes: Perdidos en Honduras (2009) =

- Presented by: Jesús Vázquez
- No. of days: 85
- No. of castaways: 15
- Winner: Maite Zúñiga
- Runner-up: Matías Fernández
- Location: Cayos Cochinos, Honduras
- No. of episodes: 13

Release
- Original network: Telecinco
- Original release: March 19 – June 11, 2009

Season chronology
- ← Previous; 2008 Next → 2010

Supervivientes 2009: Perdidos en Honduras is the sixth season of Supervivientes to air in Spain and the tenth season to air overall. This season was broadcast on the March 19, 2009 to June 11, 2009 on Telecinco. Jesús Vázquez acted as the Spanish presenter for this season while Mario Picazo acted as the host from Honduras.

== Season summary ==
The initial twist for this season was that the contestants were split up into two tribes based on gender. Another twist that was put into place this season was that of the "Judas Kiss". When a contestant was eliminated that contestant could then use their Judas Kiss to vote for someone at the next tribal council.

Michel Gurfi was supposed to be one of the final contestants but some days before the launch, he was ejected for some objections with the producers. Roberto Liaño entered one day before the launch to replace him. Ultimately, it was Maite Zúñiga who won this season over Matías Fernández and Ivonne Orsini and took home the €200,000 prize as well as a car.

== Finishing order ==
Contestant	Famous For	Original tribe	Merged tribe	Finish
Michel Gurfi; 26, Buenos Aires	Actor	Men		Quit; Day 0
Roberto Liaño; 36, Cantabria	Model	Men		1st Voted Out; Day 8
Iván Santos; 25, Barcelona	Operación Triunfo 2008 contestant	Men	Merged Tribe	2nd Voted Out; Day 15
Olfo Bosé; 28, Madrid	Artist, Miguel Bosé's nephew	Men	Merged Tribe	3rd Voted Out; Day 22
Begoña Alonso; 25, Biscay	Model and hostess	Women	Merged Tribe	4th Voted Out; Day 29
Wilma González; 24, Palma	Playboy model	Women	Merged Tribe	5th Voted Out; Day 36
Juan Díaz "El Golosina"; 63, Seville	Showman	Men	Merged Tribe	6th Voted Out; Day 43
Cuca García de Vinuesa; 58, Madrid	Journalist	Women	Merged Tribe	7th Voted Out; Day 50
Álvaro Muñoz Escassi; 34, Seville	Horse rider and polo player	Men	Merged Tribe	Evacuated; Day 57
Daniela Blume; 24, Barcelona	Sexologist and radio host	Women	Merged Tribe	8th Voted Out; Day 57
Santi Abad; 39, Barcelona	Former basketballer	Men	Merged Tribe	Evacuated; Day 61
Santi Abad; 39, Barcelona	Former basketballer	Men	Merged Tribe	9th Voted Out; Day 71
Yolanda Jiménez; 35, Madrid	Flamenco dancer, Joaquín Cortés ex-wife	Women	Merged Tribe	10th Voted Out; Day 78
Ivonne Orsini; 20, Bayamón	Miss World Puerto Rico 2008	Women	Merged Tribe	Third Place; Day 85
Matías Fernández; 36, Las Palmas	Gran Hermano 4 housemate	Men	Merged Tribe	Runner-Up; Day 85
Maite Zúñiga; 44, Éibar	Olympic middle-distance athlete	Women	Merged Tribe	Sole Survivor; Day 85

== Nominations table ==
	Week 1	Week 2	Week 3	Week 4	Week 5	Week 6	Week 7	Week 8	Week 9	Week 10	Final	Total votes
Maite	Begoña	Iván	Wilma	Yolanda	Wilma	Juanito	Cuca; Daniela	Ivonne	Yolanda	Nominated	Sole Survivor (Day 85)	5
Matías	Roberto	Iván	Cuca	Yolanda	Wilma	Daniela	Cuca; Daniela	Daniela	Maite	Nominated	Runner-Up (Day 85)	0
Ivonne	Daniela	Cuca	Daniela	Daniela	Wilma	Juanito	Cuca; Daniela	Daniela	Santi	Finalist	Third Place (Day 85)	4
Yolanda	Maite	Cuca	Daniela	Daniela	Daniela	Juanito	Cuca; Daniela	Maite	Santi	Nominated	Eliminated (Day 78)	8
Santi	Roberto	Iván	Wilma	Wilma	Wilma	Juanito	Cuca; Daniela	Ivonne	Yolanda	Eliminated (Day 71)		2
Daniela	Cuca	Ivonne	Maite	Yolanda	Wilma	Juanito	Álvaro; Cuca	Álvaro	Eliminated (Day 57)			24
Álvaro	Roberto	Cuca	Olfo	Begoña	Wilma	Juanito	Cuca; Daniela	Daniela	Evacuated (Day 57)			4
Cuca	Daniela	Ivonne	Wilma	Yolanda	Wilma	Juanito	Álvaro; Daniela	Daniela	Eliminated (Day 50)			13
Juanito	Roberto	Iván	Olfo	Yolanda	Ivonne	Daniela	Daniela	Eliminated (Day 43)				12
Wilma	Maite	Cuca	Daniela	Daniela	Santi	Juanito	Eliminated (Day 36)					11
Begoña	Maite	Cuca	Daniela	Daniela	Álvaro	Eliminated (Day 29)						1
Olfo	Juanito	Iván	Juanito	Yolanda	Eliminated (Day 22)							3
Iván	Juanito	Olfo	Olfo	Eliminated (Day 15)								6
Roberto	Juanito	Iván	Eliminated (Day 8)									4
Michel	Ejected (Day 1)											0
Nomination Notes	See note 1	See note 2	See note 3	See note 4	See note 5	See note 6	See note 7	See note 8	See note 9	See note 10	None	
Nominated by Tribe		Iván	Daniela	Yolanda	Wilma	Juanito		Daniela	Yolanda			
Nominated by Leader		Cuca	Olfo	Begoña	Ivonne	Daniela		Maite	Santi			
Nominated	Maite	Cuca; Iván	Daniela; Olfo	Begoña; Yolanda	Ivonne; Wilma	Daniela; Juanito	Cuca; Daniela	Daniela; Maite	Santi; Yolanda	Maite; Matías; Yolanda	Ivonne; Maite; Matías	
Nominated	Roberto	Cuca; Iván	Daniela; Olfo	Begoña; Yolanda	Ivonne; Wilma	Daniela; Juanito	Cuca; Daniela	Daniela; Maite	Santi; Yolanda	Maite; Matías; Yolanda	Ivonne; Maite; Matías	
Eliminated	Roberto; 54% to eliminate	Iván; 79% to eliminate	Olfo; 68% to eliminate	Begoña; 59% to eliminate	Wilma; 86% to eliminate	Juanito; 72% to eliminate	Cuca; 64% to eliminate	Daniela; 51% to eliminate	Santi; 58% to eliminate	Yolanda; 15% to save	Ivonne; Fewest votes to win (out of 3)	
Eliminated	Roberto; 54% to eliminate	Iván; 79% to eliminate	Olfo; 68% to eliminate	Begoña; 59% to eliminate	Wilma; 86% to eliminate	Juanito; 72% to eliminate	Cuca; 64% to eliminate	Daniela; 51% to eliminate	Santi; 58% to eliminate	Yolanda; 15% to save	Matías; 34% to win	
Eliminated	Roberto; 54% to eliminate	Iván; 79% to eliminate	Olfo; 68% to eliminate	Begoña; 59% to eliminate	Wilma; 86% to eliminate	Juanito; 72% to eliminate	Cuca; 64% to eliminate	Daniela; 51% to eliminate	Santi; 58% to eliminate	Yolanda; 15% to save	Maite; 66% to win	

- ^Note 1: In week one, the contestants were split into two tribes based on their gender and nominated separately.
- ^Note 2: As the winner of the immunity challenge, Álvaro was given the power to name a nominee.
- ^Note 3: As the winner of the immunity challenge, Álvaro was given the power to name a nominee..
- ^Note 4: As the winner of the immunity challenge, Álvaro was given the power to name a nominee..
- ^Note 5: As the winner of the immunity challenge, Juanito was given the power to name a nominee.
- ^Note 6: As the winner of the immunity challenge, Matías was given the power to name a nominee.
- ^Note 7: As the winner of the immunity challenge, Álvaro was given the power to name a nominee, however, as a lighter was discovered in his possession he was stripped of this power and everyone was asked to nominate two people for elimination.
- ^Note 8: As the winner of the immunity challenge, Yolanda was given the power to name a nominee.
- ^Note 9: As the winner of the immunity challenge, Ivonne was given the power to name a nominee.
- ^Note 10: As they lost the final immunity challenge, Ivonne, Maite, and Matías were automatically nominated for elimination.
