= Miss Universe Puerto Rico 2023 =

67th Miss Universe Puerto Rico

- Date: August 24, 2023
- Presenters: Estefanía Soto; José Santana; Diane Ferrer
- Entertainment: Carlos Vives; Luis Figueroa; Tommy Torres
- Venue: Luis A. Ferré Performing Arts Center, San Juan, Puerto Rico
- Broadcaster: WAPA-TV
- Entrants: 30
- Placements: 15
- Winner: Karla Inelisse Guilfú; Patillas
- Photogenic: Gina Lee García (Cataño)

Miss Universe Puerto Rico 2023 was the 67th Miss Universe Puerto Rico pageant, held at the Luis A. Ferré Performing Arts Center in San Juan, Puerto Rico, on August 24, 2023.

Ashley Cariño of Fajardo crowned Karla Guilfú of Patillas as her successor at the end of the event, and she represented Puerto Rico at Miss Universe 2023, held in El Salvador on November 18, where she was placed in the Top 5.

== Results ==
=== Placements ===
Placement	Contestant
Miss Universe Puerto Rico 2023	Patillas – Karla Inelisse Guilfú Acevedo
1st Runner-Up	Río Grande – Xarimar Acevedo Pabón
2nd Runner-Up	Toa Baja – Kiara Rivera Escudero
3rd Runner-Up	Isabela – Fiorella Medina
4th Runner-Up	San Lorenzo – Isarel Marielis Román Almeda
Top 10	Cabo Rojo – Daniela Victoria Arroyo González; Cayey – Neysha Marie Mendoza Castro; Loíza – Angela Escalera Carrasquillo; Ponce – Natalia Elena Zayas Morales; Salinas – Gabriela Veguilla Cotto
Top 15	Caguas – Celimar Rosario Caballero; Canóvanas – Andrea Sofia Collazo; Culebra – Nathalie Santa Cruz Bacardi; Hatillo – Thaiz Mariel Maceira Candelaria; Lajas – Karina Rivera Camacho

=== Special awards ===
Award	Winner	Ref.
Miss Photogenic	Cataño – Gina Lee Garcia Colón	
Miss Personality	Lajas – Karina Rivera Camacho	
Ceravé & Vichy Miss Radiant Skin	Toa Baja – Kiara Rivera Escudero	
L´Oréal Most Beautiful Hair	Cayey – Neysha Marie Mendoza Castro	
L´Oréal Mujer De Valor	Patillas – Karla Inelisse Guilfú Acevedo	
My Way Award	Patillas – Karla Inelisse Guilfú Acevedo	
Colgate Optic White Impactful Smile	Isabela – Fiorella Medina Perez	

== Contestants ==
30 delegates competed for the title of Miss Universe Puerto Rico 2023:

Municipality	Contestant
Aguadilla	Paola Crystal Rosa Badillo
Barceloneta	Nemesie Naara Martínez Negron
Barranquitas	Rocío del Mar Avilés Mercado
Bayamón	Gabriela Paola Santiago Ortiz
Cabo Rojo	Daniela Victoria Arroyo González
Caguas	Celimar Rosario Caballero
Canóvanas	Andrea Sofia Collazo
Carolina	Luisa Angélica Vázquez Ríos
Cataño	Gina Lee García Colón
Cayey	Neysha Marie Mendoza Castro
Culebra	Nathalie Santa Cruz Bacardi
Dorado	Devi Michelle Alfonso Daniels
Fajardo	Camila Molina Garcia
Guaynabo	Carmen Angélica Figueroa Guzmán
Hatillo	Thaiz Mariel Maceira Candelaria
Isabela	Fiorella Medina Perez
Jayuya	Cristina Martes Lugo
Lajas	Karina Rivera Camacho
Loíza	Angela Escalera Carrasquillo
Manatí	Sachelle González Rodriguez
Naguabo	Janairi Pomales García
Patillas	Karla Inelisse Guilfú Acevedo
Peñuelas	Mistral Cedanio Rojas
Ponce	Natalia Elena Zayas Morales
Río Grande	Xarimar Acevedo Pabón
Salinas	Gabriela Veguilla Cotto
San Juan	Rina Rivera Vargas
San Lorenzo	Isarel Marielis Román Almeda
Toa Baja	Kiara Rivera Escudero
Trujillo Alto	Juanita Polanco Irizarry

== Judges ==
=== Preliminary ===
- Anna Di Marco – Hematologist and oncologist
- Fernando Álvarez Soto – Model, financial analyst and businessman
- Ismanuel Rodríguez – Performing arts director
- Uka Green – Professional relationalist, writer and blogger
- Wanda González – Aesthetic doctor
- Carlos Thompson – President of De La Cruz
- Aixa Vázquez – News anchor

=== Final ===
- Kiara Ortega – Miss Universe Puerto Rico 2018 from Rincón
- Aixa Vázquez – News anchor
- Carlos Thompson – President of De La Cruz
- José Raúl Montes – Oculofacial surgeon
- Nilda Morales – President and chief executive of SER Puerto Rico
- Leonardo Cordero Suria – Businessman, fashion designer and chief executive of Leonardo Fifth Avenue
- Karla Ortiz – Model

Preceded by {{{before}}}	Miss Universe Puerto Rico; 2023	Succeeded by 2024
