= Magali Febles =

Dominican beautician (born 1964)

- Born: December 24, 1954 (age 71); Santo Domingo, Dominican Republic
- Occupations: Beautician; National director Dominican Republic (2004–present); Puerto Rico (2003–2009); Haiti (2010–2015)

Magali Febles (born 24 December 1964 in Santo Domingo) is a Dominican beautician and beauty pageant circuit personality.

Febles is the national director for the Miss Dominican Republic Universe franchise and has previously served as national director for Miss Universe Puerto Rico and Miss Haiti franchises.

== Pageantry ==
=== Miss Dominican Republic and Miss Puerto Rico ===
Febles acquired the Miss Puerto Rico Universe in 2003 and Miss Dominican Republic Universe in 2004. As holder of the franchises, she was responsible for preparing and sending delegates from Puerto Rico and the Dominican Republic to Miss Universe. Her most successful delegate to date is Zuleyka Rivera from Puerto Rico, who was crowned Miss Universe 2006. She was the former owner of two salons, Magali Febles Salon and Spa in San Juan, Puerto Rico, which she later sold in order to concentrate her energy on running both franchises.

In 2009, shortly after Mayra Matos was crowned Miss Puerto Rico Universe 2009, Febles lost the Miss Puerto Rico Universe franchise to Luisito Vigoreaux and Desiree Lowry, who took over the training of Matos and renamed the pageant Miss Universe Puerto Rico. Febles' alleged treatment of Ingrid Rivera, Miss Puerto Rico Universe 2008, and problems with the organization are allegedly reasons for her losing the franchise.

=== Miss Haiti ===
In 2010, she began managing the Miss Haiti Universe franchise. A delegate from Haiti had not placed in Miss Universe from 1975, when Gerthie David finished as 1st Runner-Up in the contest and the second black woman to be placed in the finals, until 2016, a year after Febles lost the franchise rights, when Raquel Pélissier finished as 1st Runner-Up as well.

In 2016, the license of Miss Haiti Universe was awarded to Chris Puesan from the Dominican Republic, a pageant coach and license holder.
