= Miss World Puerto Rico 2009 =

Annual competition was held in Puerto Rico

- Date: July 23, 2009
- Presenters: Fernando Allende; Jennifer Guevara; Thebyam Carrión
- Venue: Teatro Tapia, San Juan, Puerto Rico
- Broadcaster: Puerto Rico; WAPA-TV; United States; Mega TV
- Entrants: 22
- Placements: 12
- Winner: Jennifer Colón; Bayamón
- Congeniality: Carla Harrison; Camuy
- Photogenic: Libni Garcia Pabellón; Juncos

Miss World Puerto Rico 2009 was the 38th Miss World Puerto Rico pageant, held at the Teatro Alejandro Tapia y Rivera in San Juan, Puerto Rico, on July 23, 2009.

Ivonne Orsini of San Juan crowned Jennifer Colón of Bayamón, as her successor at the end of the event. Colón represented Puerto Rico at Miss World 2009. In 2010, no contest was held and the 1st Runner-Up of the 2009 contest, Yara Lasanta of Barranquitas was appointed as Miss World Puerto Rico 2010 and represented Puerto Rico at Miss World 2010 where she finished in the Top 25.

== Results ==
=== Placements ===
Placement	Contestant
Miss World Puerto Rico 2009	Bayamón – Jennifer Colón Alvarado
1st Runner-Up	Barranquitas – Yara Liz Lasanta
2nd Runner-Up	Vega Baja – Melissa Serrano Flores
3rd Runner-Up	Isabela – Amanda Díaz Torres
4th Runner-Up	Juncos – Libni Garcia Pabellón
Top 12	Caguas – Glorimar Serrano; Camuy – Carla Harrison; Culebra – Rebecca Fernandez; Guaynabo – Mariselle Morales; Humacao – Maria Angelica Hernandez; Ponce – Azarel Nadal Torres; Orocovis – Jennifer Ortiz

=== Appointment ===
Title	Delegate
Miss World Puerto Rico 2010	Barranquitas – Yara Liz Lasanta

== Awards ==
The following award winners automatically advanced to become semifinalists.

Award	Contestant
Sports	Culebra – Rebecca Fernández
Top Model	Bayamón – Jennifer Colón
Best Body	Barranquitas – Yara Lasanta
Talent	Guaynabo – Mariselle Morales
Beauty With a Purpose	Orocovis – Jennifer Ortiz

== Contestants ==
- Barceloneta - Jaileene Cintron
- Barranquitas - Yara Liz Lasanta Santiago
- Bayamón - Jennifer Colón Alvarado
- Caguas - Glorimar Serrano
- Camuy - Carla Harrison
- Cayey - Cynthia Morales
- Corozal - Rosarito Nevarez
- Culebra - Rebecca Fernandez
- Fajardo - Yizelle Ramos
- Guayama - Krystal Ruiz
- Guaynabo - Mariselle Morales
- Hormigueros - Ashley Valentin
- Humacao - Maria Angelica Hernandez
- Isabela - Amanda Díaz Torres
- Juncos - Libni Garcia Pabellón
- Orocovis - Jennifer Ortiz
- Ponce - Azarel Nadal Torres
- Río Grande - Karen Robles
- San Juan - Veronica Santiago
- Santa Isabel - Marjorie Rodriguez
- Vega Baja - Melissa Serrano Flores
- Villalba - Dagmarie Cappiello

== Crossovers ==
- Yara Liz Lasanta Santiago (Barranquitas) previously won Miss Puerto Rico Teenage 2001, and Miss Teen International 2001, placed 4th runner-up at Miss Puerto Rico Universe 2005, 2nd runner-up at Miss Puerto Rico Universe 2007, and 2nd runner-up in Univision's Nuestra Belleza Latina 2007.
  - In 2010 the Miss Mundo de Puerto Rico Organization did not hold its annual contest, therefore Yara was appointed as the new Miss Puerto Rico World 2010'. Yara would later on represent Puerto Rico at Miss World 2010 in which she placed as a semi-finalist. Prior to the final night, Yara had won the Miss World Beach Beauty competition, which was what guaranteed her a spot in the semi-finals on the final night of the pageant.
- Amanda Díaz Torres (Isabela) previously placed 4th runner-up at Miss Puerto Rico Universe 2008 and 3rd runner-up at Miss World Puerto Rico 2004. She used to hold the title of Miss Puerto Rico International 2009 and was supposed to represent Puerto Rico at Miss International 2009 but resigned.
- Jennifer Colón Alvarado (Bayamón), Glorimar Serrano (Caguas), Rebecca Fernandez (Culebra), and Karen Robles (Río Grande) participated at Miss Puerto Rico Universe 2009. Rebecca and Karen did not place, Glorimar placed as a semi-finalist, and Jennifer placed as 1st runner-up.
