= Miss Puerto Rico Universe 2009 =

Competition held at the José Miguel Agrelot Coliseum in Hato Rey, San Juan, Puerto Rico

- Date: October 22, 2008
- Presenters: Braulio Castillo Jr.; Rodolfo Jimenez; Zuleyka Rivera
- Venue: Coliseo de Puerto Rico José Miguel Agrelot, Hato Rey, Puerto Rico
- Broadcaster: WAPA-TV
- Entrants: 70
- Placements: 20
- Winner: Mayra Matos Pérez; Cabo Rojo

Miss Puerto Rico Universe 2009 was the 54th Miss Puerto Rico Universe pageant, held at the José Miguel Agrelot Coliseum in San Juan, Puerto Rico, on October 22, 2008.

Ingrid Marie Rivera crowned Mayra Matos of Cabo Rojo as her successor at the end of the event. Matos represented Puerto Rico at Miss Universe 2009 in Nassau, Bahamas.

== Pageant preparations ==
WAPA-TV signed a contract with Miss Puerto Rico Universe to transmit a reality show titled Por la corona, beginning on August 15, 2008. The public will select via text message, with five of the participants classifying directly to the pageant's semi-final. A jury composed of Sully Díaz, Mayra López Mulero and Omar Matos was assembled for the program, while Joyceline Montero was contracted as host.

=== Por La Corona results ===
Throughout eight weeks, the show Por La Corona featured a different group of 9 or 8 contestants each week. The public voted for their favorite contestant that was featured on the show that particular week. One winner was selected from each group of girls shown during the eight-week period. After the eight-week run, all 70 contestants had been featured, 8 of them had already been selected as winners, however after all contestants had been featured the public had the opportunity to select 4 more other girls to join the original 8 winners to compete for the 5 spots that will automatically advance them to the semi-finals of the Miss Puerto Rico Universe 2009 pageant on October 22, 2008.

Winners from each week:

- First Week: Glorimar Serrano (Caguas)
- Second Week: Mónica Cristina Pastrana González (Arecibo)
- Third week: Darling Cruz (Las Marías)
- Fourth week: Angélica Colón (Juana Díaz)
- Fifth week: Edlyn Pérez (Coamo)
- Sixth week: Gloria Sophia Almonte (Carolina)
- Seventh week: Stephanie Figueroa (Bayamón)
- Eighth week: Chantee Díaz (San Lorenzo)

Dariana Santiago (Lares), Krizia Lugo (Naguabo), Alexandra González (Salinas) and Jeann-Marie Maldonado Cintrón (Hatillo) were the 4 other contestants the public selected.

Out of the 12 contestants selected by the public, here are the 5 contestants who will automatically advanced to the semi-finals:

- Glorimar Serrano (Caguas)
- Gloria Sophia Almonte (Carolina)
- Krizia Lugo (Naguabo)
- Chantee Díaz (San Lorenzo)
- Alexandra González (Salinas)

== Castings ==
- On March 1, 2008, the first casting call was held in Bayamón, Puerto Rico.
- On March 16, 2008, the second casting call was held in San Juan, Puerto Rico.

== Notes ==
- Miss Cabo Rojo, Mayra Matos, represented Puerto Rico at Miss Universe 2009 in Nassau, Bahamas where she finished as 4th runner-up. This was Puerto Rico's highest placement so far at Miss Universe since Zuleyka Rivera's win in 2006 until 2018 when Kiara Ortega also finished in the Top 5 and 2019 when Madison Anderson finished as 1st Runner-Up. She previously won the title of Miss Teen International 2006.
- Miss San Juan, Jennifer Colón, later competed at Miss Mundo de Puerto Rico 2009 representing Bayamón where she won and later went on to represent Puerto Rico at Miss World 2009 in Johannesburg, South Africa where she failed to place in the semi-finals. She previously finished as 2nd runner-up at Miss Puerto Rico Teen 2006. She later competed at Miss Universe Puerto Rico 2024 representing Orocovis where she won the title and represented the island at Miss Universe 2024 in Mexico City, Mexico and she finished in the Top 12.
- Miss Santurce, Sharon Gómez, represented Puerto Rico at Miss International 2006 in Beijing, China where she finished in the semi-finals. She also finished as 3rd runner-up at Miss Hawaiian Tropic 2008 and competed in Nuestra Belleza Latina 2008. She was also Miss Puerto Rico Turismo 2006.
- Miss Adjuntas, Haydil Rivera, previously held the titles of Miss Teen Puerto Rico 2004, Miss Teen World 2004, Miss Puerto Rico International 2007 and represented Puerto Rico at Miss International 2007 in Tokyo, Japan where she finished in the semi-finals.
- Miss Arroyo, Ruth Rivera, competed in Miss Puerto Rico Teen 2004 and Miss World Puerto Rico 2005.
- Miss Carolina, Gloria Almonte, held the titles Miss New York Teen USA 2001 and Miss New York USA 2007 and finished as 1st runner-up at Miss Teen USA 2001 and was unplaced at Miss USA 2007.
- Miss Canóvanas, Carla Vázquez, and Miss Patillas, Rosaura Latorre resigned from the competition only days before the final pageant night. The public found about their resignation during the preliminary competition when neither contestant participated in the event.
- Miss Maunabo, Yessenia Monge, was the shortest participant in Miss Puerto Rico Universe 2009 (5'2").
- Miss Jayuya, Tessy Inez Liddell, is the only contestant who was never featured on the show Por La Corona.
- Miss Yabucoa, Karelys Robles, was hospitalized and had to go under surgery days before the final competition, therefore she was not able to compete during the final competition.

=== Crossovers ===
- Monica Pastrana (Miss Arecibo), Stephanie Figueroa (Miss Bayamón), and Agnes Benítez (Miss Cataño) participated at Nuestra Belleza Latina 2009. Agnes became one of the semi-finalists but was eliminated right before the twelve finalists were selected. Monica and Stephanie became part of the official twelve finalists, however Stephanie was disqualified from the competition within the first week, and Monica finished in seventh place overall.
- Glorimar Serrano (Miss Caguas), Rebecca Fernández (Miss Culebra), and Jennifer Colón Alvarado (Miss San Juan) participated at Miss World Puerto Rico 2009. Glorimar and Rebecca placed as one of the twelve semi-finalists, and Jennifer won the pageant.
- Yessenia Monge (Miss Maunabo) later participated at Miss Puerto Rico Petite 2009.
- Darla Pacheco (Miss Ponce) would later represent Puerto Rico at Miss International Beauty 2009 in which she placed as a semi-finalist. On November 7, 2011, Darla later competed in Miss Universe Puerto Rico 2012 pageant representing Yabucoa where she finished as Top 10. She later won the title of Miss Earth Puerto Rico 2012 and represented the island at Miss Earth 2012 but failed to place in the semi-finals.
- Agnes Benítez (Miss Cataño) would later represent Puerto Rico at the Miss Tourism Queen International 2009 pageant in which she placed as a semi-finalist and was appointed the title of Miss Tourism of Americas. In 2011 Agnes was crowned Miss Puerto Rico Earth 2011 and she represented Puerto Rico at Miss Earth 2011 but failed to place in the semi-finals.
- Stephanie Pagan (Miss Luquillo) would later represent United States at Miss Intercontinental 2009 in which she placed as a semi-finalist.
- Mónica Pastrana (Miss Arecibo) would later represent Puerto Rico at Miss International 2009.
