= Mexican Dynasties =

- Genre: Reality television
- Country of origin: United States
- No. of seasons: 1
- No. of episodes: 10

Production
- Executive producers: Pam Healey; Lisa Shannon; Barrie Bernstein; Scott Teti; Paulina Williams; Jaime Davila; Rico Martinez
- Production locations: Mexico City, Mexico
- Production companies: Campanario Entertainment; Shed Media

Original release
- Network: Bravo
- Release: February 26, 2019 – present

Mexican Dynasties is a television series on the American television network Bravo that premiered on February 26, 2019.

== Overview ==
Mexican Dynasties follow three wealthy families in Mexico City and their over-the-top lifestyles. The Allendes, Bessudos, and Madrazos are connected to one another through personal and professional relationships dating back decades.

== Cast ==
=== The Allende family ===
==== Fernando Allende ====
Considering his earlier years, Fernando has enjoyed as a singer, actor, and artist, and serves as the backbone of his family. He married Mari in the late 1980s and the couple has two sons, Elan and Adan.

==== Mari Allende ====
Puerto Rico-born Mari works as her husband's manager.

==== Adan Allende ====
The younger son of Fernando and Mari, Adan is trying to start a solo career in the music industry and move away from his father's shadow.

==== Elan Allende ====
Elan, the elder son of Fernando and Mari, Elan has made a career in commercial real estate but is also trying to make it in the music industry with his wife, Jenny. The couple is in a latin pop duo called Shambayah, which merges "tropical, urban, pop and reggae influences." During season one, Elan is working to fix a strained relationship with his father and brother, caused by his decision to leave the band he and his brother shared.

==== Jenny Colón Allende ====
Jenny is a Puerto Rican singer, TV host, model, and pageant queen, who represented Puerto Rico in Miss World 2009. She and her husband, Elan, have two children, María Valentina and Fernando José. During season one, Jenny tries to solidify her place within the Allende family when she and Elan move to Mexico City; she's often at odds with Fernando and Mari, who never approved of her marrying their son. In May 2021, Jenny and Elan separated and filed for divorce, with Jenny later becoming engaged to Puerto Rican actor Jairo Calero and welcoming a daughter together before separating. Colón is now dating Puerto Rican filmmaker Johan Lopéz. In June 2024, she competed for and won the title of Miss Universe Puerto Rico 2024 and will represent Puerto Rico at Miss Universe 2024.

=== The Bessudo family ===
==== Raquel Bessudo ====
Raquel is a television show host and is considered the “Grand Dame of Beauty” in Mexico. She was married to Leon Bessudo, whose father owned the beverage company Jarritos, for 58 years before his death in 2018.

==== Doris Bessudo ====
Doris manages her mother's career and is a partner at Nine Muses, a female-led public relations firm, based in Los Angeles. In season one, she returns to Mexico City to help her mother, Raquel, navigate life in the aftermath of her husband's death. Doris is also the cousin of Mauricio Umansky, who is married to Real Housewives of Beverly Hills star Kyle Richards.

=== The Madrazo family ===
==== Óscar Madrazo ====
Óscar owns the largest and most prestigious modeling agency in Latin America, which he started when he was 18 years old. He also owns a social media and production house and co-hosts “Qué Madrazo,” an entertainment talk show, with his sister, Paulina. He made headlines when he became the first openly gay man in Latin America to have children through surrogacy.

==== Paulina Madrazo ====
Paulina is an executive at her brother Óscar Madrazo’s modeling agency and co-hosts “Qué Madrazo,” an entertainment talk show in Mexico City, with him.

== Episodes ==
No.	Title	Original release date	U.S. viewers (millions)
1	"Dynasties, Dinero, and Dysfunction"	February 26, 2019	0.59
Doris Bessudo returns to Mexico City to help her mother, famed fashion critic Raquel Bessudo, pick up the pieces after Doris’ father’s death. Meanwhile, renowned Mexican singer and actor Fernando Allende and his wife, Mari, anticipate the arrival of their oldest son, Elan, and his wife, Jenny, who have returned to the city to take the next steps in their music career. Things get uncomfortable, however, when Elan’s younger brother, Adan, is forced to give up his bedroom the night before his big audition on La Voz (the Mexican version of "The Voice”). And finally, popular tv personality Óscar Madrazo returns home from a vacation with his children only to have to bury a family member who’s been kept in the freezer of his inseparable, zany sibling, Paulina Madrazo, for a week. All three families reunite at a welcome home party for Doris, but old rivalries arise between Elan and his brother when Adan and Fernando steal the musical spotlight.
2	"A Star is Torn"	March 5, 2019	0.48
Elan and Jenny Allende kick off their music career by signing with a major Mexican record label. The brotherly Allende competition continues, as Adan auditions for La Voz with an “epic" performance, making parents Fernando and Mari gush over their child prodigy. Meanwhile, Doris adjusts to working in a home office, but can't get her newly widowed mother Raquel to leave her alone to work in peace. When Doris finally convinces Raquel to attend Óscar and Paulina's Canasta party to get her out the house, Raquel accidentally offends several of the Madrazo children. Later, Adan is forced to make one of the biggest decisions of his life when his family tries to convince him that signing the La Voz contract is not a good career move.
3	"La Voz of Reason"	March 12, 2019	0.49
Óscar’s birthday begins with a mariachi band and ends with a wild S&M themed party. Paulina worries about her brother growing another year older without a serious partner in his life. Jenny and Elan move their kids to Mexico, but with all the Allendes living under one roof and the “tripod” partying 24/7, the chaos proves too much for them. Adan worries he made the wrong decision about La Voz and, after a meeting with Doris, wonders if he needs new advisors in his life.
4	"A Family Fractured"	March 19, 2019	0.48
The three dynasties get together to celebrate Mari and Fernando’s 31st wedding anniversary on the beautiful canals of Xochimilco. Adan hits a sour note with his parents when he brings Doris along to a recording session with Ricky Martin’s producer. Doris puts her worries about Mari and Adan aside when her husband, Jorge, comes for a visit. Jenny and Elan record new songs with their producers, but are upset when Mari and Fernando’s interest in their careers falls flat, and tensions between the family reaches a boiling point.
5	"Grudges and Gefilte Fish"	March 26, 2019	0.47
Jenny and Elan move into their own place and embrace living in Mexico by taking their kids to visit a true Mexican market. Meanwhile, Óscar officially puts himself on the market in his search for love. Raquel and Doris cook up a plan to introduce the Madrazos and Allendes to their Jewish culture. While Fernando and Mari paint themselves into a grudge-holding corner, Jenny and Elan dread seeing them at Doris’ Shabbat Dinner for the first time since their explosive fight.
6	"Love Is in the Air"	April 2, 2019	0.42
Adan and Elan are done wrestling with their stormy past and regain a hold on their brotherly love when they go to a Lucha Libre match. Óscar overcomes a couple of fears: heights and commitment, as he and Paulina take their kids on a hot air balloon tour, where he gathers the courage to let his family know that his friend from Brazil will be visiting him. Raquel and Doris are interviewed by Mexico’s premiere magazine, Clase, for the first time since Leon’s death, and the journalist uncovers another layer to the Bessudo family. Adan meets up with Doris to talk business and is confronted about some decisions he’s made behind her back.
7	"Tres Is a Crowd"	April 9, 2019	0.43
Raquel considers getting back into the dating world when she meets up with an old friend but Doris worries it's too soon after her father’s passing. After connecting with Tarek on a deeper level, Óscar is finally ready to open up more – or so he thought. He decides to bring Tarek to Doris’ event but second-guesses that decision when he realizes that he’ll be introducing him to friends and even more terrifying, his mom and Paulina. Doris and Mari play tug of war with Adan’s career and Doris makes it clear that she needs complete control. But after Adan hits a high note at her event, she starts questioning if she made the right decision.
8	"Paz for Concern"	April 16, 2019	0.37
Raquel continues to see Sam, so Doris does some investigating into his background. Elan and Jenny’s friend Maria Paz comes for a visit and Jenny turns into cupid when she decides to set her up with Adan. Mari is still reeling from her talk with Doris at the Emerging Artists Event and daggers are thrown when the two reunite at Oscar and Paulina’s "Que Madrazo!" anniversary party. Mari bestows Óscar and Paulina with magic crystals and when Jenny finds out, she reveals that the crystals may have a more sinister meaning.
9	"The Runaway"	April 23, 2019	0.38
Mari reveals what Doris said at the "Que Madrazo party!", but Adan refuses to be put in a corner. He seeks solace and an airbed at Jenny and Elan’s – and the company of their houseguest, Maria Paz. Doris helps her mother launch a line of skincare creams, but Raquel still won’t tell her what the secret ingredients are. Jenny’s ecstatic that her matchmaking skills seemed to have worked with Adan and Maria Paz. Meanwhile, Mari is not as ecstatic, believing outside forces are to blame for Adan breaking the family chains.
10	"Blood is Thicker Than Tequila"	April 30, 2019	0.44
In the season finale, Raquel invites Doris to sit for a portrait and Doris happily realizes that her mom is doing much better. Upset that Adan is still staying with Jenny and Elan, Mari channels all her energy into getting her son home. Meanwhile, Óscar is ready to take the next step with Tarek, and introduces him to his children. Jenny and Elan worry when Adan abruptly leaves their house in the middle of the night after a mysterious phone call. At Lunario, the dynasties – and the tripod – reunite, reminding each other that blood is always thicker than tequila.

== Production ==
Bravo reached out to Jaime Dávila, a former development executive at Bravo, with the interest of creating a television series set in Mexico City. After Dávila told them it would be difficult to find "rich Mexicans willing to open up their lives" as the Bravo executives had asked, the network connected his production company with Shed Media, which produces The Real Housewives of New York City, to assemble a cast and a series.

== See also ==
- List of programs broadcast by Bravo
