= Jennifer Colón =

Puerto Rican model and beauty pageant titleholder

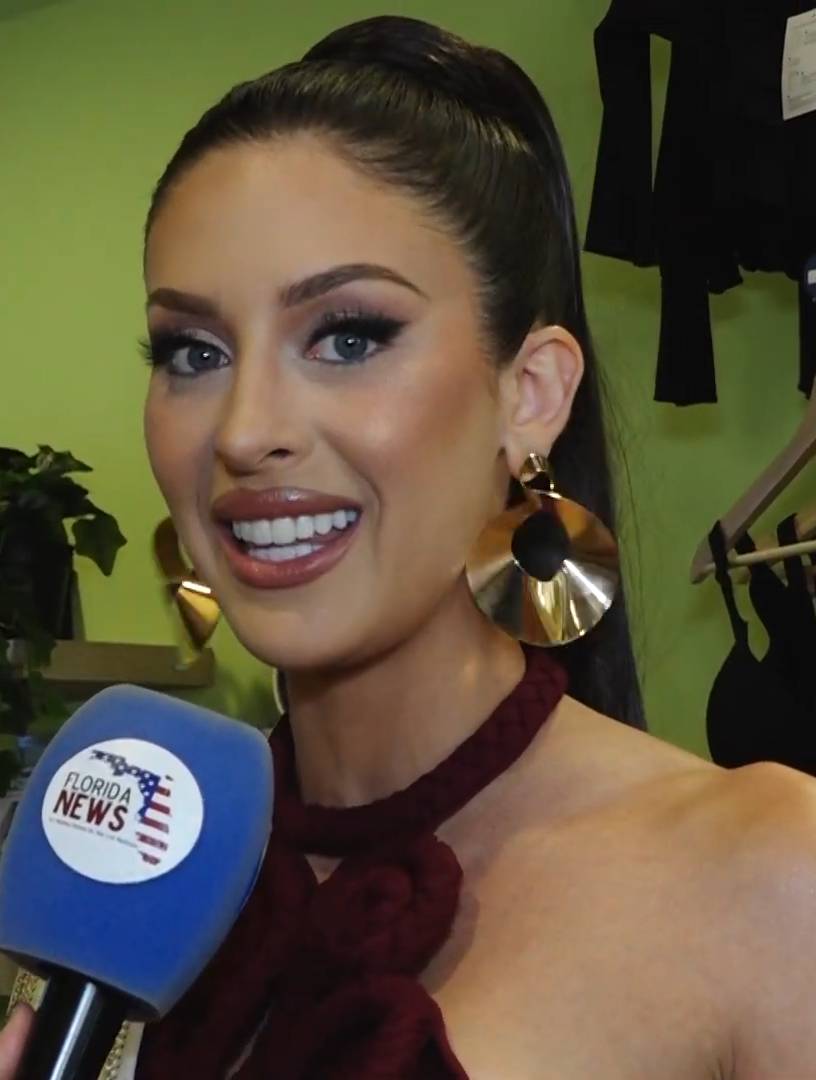
- Colón in 2024
- Born: Hartford, Connecticut, U.S.
- Spouse: Elán Allende (m. 2010; div. 2021)
- Children: 3
- Beauty pageant titleholder
- Title: Miss World Puerto Rico 2009; Miss Universe Puerto Rico 2024
- Major competitions: Miss Teen Puerto Rico 2006; (2nd Runner-Up); Miss Puerto Rico Universe 2009; (1st Runner-Up); (Most Beautiful Hair); Miss World Puerto Rico 2009; (Winner); Miss World 2009; (Unplaced); Miss Universe Puerto Rico 2024; (Winner); (Most Radiant Skin); Miss Universe 2024; (Top 12); MGI All Stars 2nd Edition; (TBD)

Jennifer Colón is a Puerto Rican beauty pageant titleholder who won Miss Universe Puerto Rico 2024. Colón represented Puerto Rico at Miss Universe 2024, and finished in the top 12. Colón won Miss World Puerto Rico 2009 and represented Puerto Rico at Miss World 2009.

== Early life ==
Colón was born in Connecticut, United States to Puerto Rican parents. Within months of her birth, her family moved back to their hometown, Orocovis, Puerto Rico.

In 2005, Colón graduated with honors from high school Colegio Bautista in Levittown, Puerto Rico and studied chemistry for three years (2005–2008) at Universidad Interamericana de Puerto Rico in Cupey.

As of 2024, Colón has her own practice as a medical esthetician and iridologist.

== Pageantry ==
=== Miss Puerto Rico Universe 2009 ===
On 22 October 2008, Colón competed in the Miss Puerto Rico Universe 2009 competition representing San Juan municipality, and was first runner-up to Mayra Matos of Cabo Rojo. She also won the award for "Most Beautiful Hair".

=== Miss World Puerto Rico 2009 ===
In early 2009, Colón represented her hometown of Bayamón and won Miss World Puerto Rico 2009, on 23 July 2009 in Puerto Rico. She was crowned by Ivonne Orsini, Miss World Puerto Rico 2008.

=== Miss World 2009 ===
Colón represented Puerto Rico at Miss World 2009 in Johannesburg, South Africa, on 12 December 2009 and was unplaced.

=== Miss Universe Puerto Rico 2024 ===
On 18 April 2024, Colón was announced as one of the 28 delegates competing at Miss Universe Puerto Rico 2024, representing Orocovis. Colón won and was crowned by outgoing titleholder Karla Guilfú. As a 36-year-old woman and single mother of three children, Colón made history by becoming the first woman over the age of 28 and first mother to win the title.

=== Miss Universe 2024 ===
Colón represented Puerto Rico at Miss Universe 2024, placing in the Top 12.

After Miss Guatemala 2023, Michelle Cohn, Miss Colombia 2023, Camila Avella, and Miss Venezuela 2024, Ileana Márquez, Colón was also the fourth mother selected to participate in the pageant. Colón was the second single mother selected to compete in the pageant, after Miss Venezuela 2024, Ileana Márquez. In July, Miss Netherlands 2024, Faith Landman, and Miss Malta 2024, Beatrice Njoya, became the fifth and sixth mothers to have been selected in the history of the pageant. They are also the third and forth single mothers to compete in the pageant.

== Personal life ==
Colón married Elán Allende, son of Mexican artist Fernando Allende, on 21 September 2010, in Puerto Rico. They have two children.

Together, they formed a Latin pop music duo called Shambayah. Previously, both Allende and Colón were cast members for the reality TV show on Bravo called Mexican Dynasties. They later separated and divorced.

In 2021, Colón was engaged to Puerto Rican Colombian model, actor and tv host, Jairo Calero. They have one child. In 2022, they separated.

Awards and achievements
Preceded by Karla Guilfú, Patillas	Miss Universe Puerto Rico; 2024	Succeeded by Zashely Alicea, Dorado
Preceded by Ivonne Orsini, San Juan	Miss World Puerto Rico; 2009	Succeeded by Yara Lasanta, Barranquitas
