= Yara Lasanta =

Puerto Rican beauty pageant titleholder

- Born: Yara Liz Lasanta Santiago; April 3, 1986 (age 40); Barranquitas, Puerto Rico
- Height: 1.73 m (5 ft 8 in)
- Beauty pageant titleholder
- Title: Miss Teen International 2001; Miss World Puerto Rico 2010
- Hair color: Black
- Eye color: Brown
- Major competitions: Miss Teen International 2001 (Winner); Miss Puerto Rico Universe 2005 (4th runner-up); Nuestra Belleza Latina 2007 (2nd runner-up); Miss Puerto Rico Universe 2007 (2nd runner-up); Miss World Puerto Rico 2009 (1st runner-up); Miss World 2010 (Top 25) (Miss World Beach Beauty)

Yara Liz Lasanta Santiago (born April 3, 1986 in Barranquitas, Puerto Rico) is a Puerto Rican meteorologist and beauty pageant titleholder who participated and finished top 25 in Miss World 2010.

== Early life ==
Prior to becoming Miss World Puerto Rico 2010, Lasanta was crowned Miss Teen International in 2001. She also competed in Nuestra Belleza Latina 2007, where she placed second runner-up to Alejandra Espinoza of Mexico. She competed in Miss Puerto Rico Universe 2005 where she finished 4th Runner-Up. Later, she competed in Miss Puerto Rico Universe 2007 where she finished up as 2nd Runner-Up. She is currently a weather meteorologist for Univision 34.

== Miss World Puerto Rico ==
Born in Barranquitas, Lasanta participated in Miss World Puerto Rico 2009, where she placed first runner-up to eventual winner, Jennifer Colón.

One year later, she was appointed by the national director of Miss Mundo de Puerto Rico as the official representative to Miss World 2010, held in Sanya, China.

== Miss World 2010 ==
In an event held at Mandarin Oriental, Sanya on October 19, 2010, Lasanta was named Miss World Beach Beauty, automatically becoming one of the semifinalists in Miss World 2010.

Awards and achievements
Preceded by (Gibraltar) Kaiane Aldorino	Miss World Beach Beauty; 2010	Succeeded by (England) Alize Lily Mounter
Preceded by Jennifer Colón (Bayamón)	Miss World Puerto Rico; 2010	Succeeded by Amanda Vilanova (San Juan)
Preceded by First Edition	Nuestra Belleza Latina 2nd Runner-Up; 2007	Succeeded by (Cuba) Dayami Padron
