= Febles =

Febles is a surname. Notable people with the surname include:

- Carlos Febles (born 1976), Dominican baseball player and coach
- Daniel Febles (born 1991), Venezuelan footballer
- Magali Febles (born 1964), Dominican beautician and pageant director
- Pedro Febles (1958–2011), Venezuelan football player and manager
