= Miss Dominican Republic 2021 =

64th Miss Dominican Republic competition, national beauty pageant edition

- Date: November 7, 2021
- Venue: Salón de Eventos Sambil, Santo Domingo, Dominican Republic
- Broadcaster: Color Visión
- Entrants: 15
- Placements: 10
- Winner: Andreina Martínez; Com.Dom. EEUU

Miss Dominican Republic 2021 (Spanish: Miss República Dominicana 2021) was held on November 7, 2021 at Salón de Eventos Sambil. Kimberly Jiménez of La Romana crowned her successor at the end of the event. The winner represented Dominican Republic at Miss Universe 2021. The 1st Runner-Up competed in Miss United Continents 2021 and the 2nd Runner-Up will compete in Reina Hispanoamericana 2022.

Originally, Andreina Martínez of Comunidad Dominicana en los Estados Unidos was crowned the winner but tested positive for COVID-19 just after the competition. 1st Runner-Up Debbie Áflalo of Azua represented Dominican Republic at Miss Universe 2021 as Martínez did not have time to quarantine before traveling to Israel for the competition and she would represent Dominican Republic at Miss Universe 2022 instead.

== Results ==
=== Placements ===
Color keys

- The contestant was a Runner-up in an International pageant.
- The contestant did not place.

Placement	Contestant	International placement
Miss Dominican Republic 2021	Estados Unidos – Andreína Martínez	2nd Runner-Up – Miss Universe 2022
1st Runner-Up	Azua – Debbie Áflalo	Unplaced – Miss Universe 2021
2nd Runner-Up	La Vega – Yamilex Hernández	
3rd Runner-Up	Samaná – Elianny Capellán	
4th Runner-Up	La Romana – Érika Silverio	
Top 10	Distrito Nacional – Yeimi Hernández; María Trinidad Sánchez – Hilda Puntiel; Puerto Plata – Silvana Dominicci; Santiago – Leslye Olivo; Valverde – Nicole Jimeno	

=== Special awards ===
Special Awards	Candidate
Best Body (voted by the organization of Miss Dominican Republic)	Com.Dom. EEUU – Andreina Martínez
Miss Improvement (voted by the organization of Miss Dominican Republic)	Bahoruco – Scarlett Castillos
Miss Internet (voted by the contest panel)	La Vega – Yamilex Hernández
Miss Photogenic (voted by the official photographer of the contest)	Distrito Nacional – Yeimi Hernández
Miss Communication (voted by the organization of Miss Dominican Republic)	María Trinidad Sánchez – Hilda Puntiel
Miss Elegance (voted by the organization of Miss Dominican Republic)	Samaná – Elianny Capellán
Miss Congeniality (voted by the candidates of the contest)	Azua – Debbie Áflalo

== Candidates ==
Represents	Candidates	Age (Note: Ages at the time of the pageant)	Height	Hometown
Azua	Debbie Jochabed Áflalo Vargas	27	1.80 m (5 ft 11 in)	Azua de Compostela
Bahoruco	Scarlett Castillos de los Santos	18	1.72 m (5 ft 8 in)	La Vega
Distrito Nacional	Yeimi Paola Hernández O'Neal	22	1.80 m (5 ft 11 in)	Santo Domingo Norte
Com. Dom. En Estados Unidos	Andreina Martínez Founier-Rosado	24	1.84 m (6 ft 0 in)	New York City
Espaillat	Leidy Laura Liberato Hernández	21	1.78 m (5 ft 10 in)	Gaspar Hernández
La Altagracia	Cinthya Núñez Ramos	22	1.75 m (5 ft 9 in)	Higüey
La Romana	Érika del Carmen Silverio Capellán	26	1.83 m (6 ft 0 in)	La Romana
La Vega	Yamilex Hernández del Orbe	21	1.83 m (6 ft 0 in)	La Vega
María Trinidad Sánchez	Hilda Noemí Puntiel Sosa	23	1.76 m (5 ft 9 in)	El Factor
Puerto Plata	Silvana Dominicci Fáulkner	23	1.75 m (5 ft 9 in)	Sosúa
Samaná	Elianny Capellán Serra	23	1.78 m (5 ft 10 in)	Sánchez
San Pedro de Macorís	Nallely Estefanía Cabrera de Jesús	19	1.84 m (6 ft 0 in)	San Pedro de Macorís
Santiago	Leslye Isabel Olivo Collado	22	1.80 m (5 ft 11 in)	Santiago de los Caballeros
Santo Domingo	Áshley Yínyer de León de la Cruz	21	1.73 m (5 ft 8 in)	Santo Domingo Oeste
Valverde	Lidia Nicole Jimeno Morel	27	1.73 m (5 ft 8 in)	Mao
