= Miss Puerto Rico Universe 2007 =

Beauty pageant edition

- Date: November 22, 2006
- Presenters: Alexandra Malagón; Raymond Arrieta
- Entertainment: Rakim & Ken-Y
- Venue: Puerto Rico Convention Center, San Juan, Puerto Rico
- Broadcaster: Telemundo
- Entrants: 30
- Placements: 13
- Winner: Uma Blasini Perez; Guayanilla

Miss Puerto Rico Universe 2007 was the 52nd Miss Puerto Rico Universe pageant, held at the Centro de Convenciones de Puerto Rico in San Juan, Puerto Rico, on November 22, 2006.

Zuleyka Rivera Mendoza crowned Uma Blasini Perez of Guayanilla as her successor at the end of the event. Blasini represented Puerto Rico at Miss Universe 2007 in Mexico City, Mexico.

== Crossovers ==
- Miss Guayanilla, Uma Blasini, represented Puerto Rico at Miss Universe 2007 in Mexico City, Mexico where she failed to place in the semi-finals. She previously competed at Miss Puerto Rico Universe 2005 representing San Juan where she finished as 5th runner-up.
- Miss Barceloneta, Melissa Rivera, previously competed at Miss Mundo de Puerto Rico 2003 but did not place as a finalist.
- Miss Barranquitas, Yara Lasanta, previously held the titles of Miss Teen International 2001 and Miss Teen Latina USA 2003. She also competed at Miss Puerto Rico Universe 2005 where she finished as 4th runner-up. Yara later went on to place 2nd runner-up in Univision's Nuestra Belleza Latina 2007 and 1st runner-up at the Miss World Puerto Rico 2009. She later represented Puerto Rico at Miss World 2010 in which she finished in the semi-finals. Prior to the final night, Yara had won the Miss World Beach Beauty competition, which was what guaranteed her a spot in the semi-finals on the final night of the pageant.
- Miss Coamo, Sofía Alvarez, previously placed as one of the ten finalists at Miss Puerto Rico Teen 2003 and 1st runner-up at Elite Model Look 2003 contest.
- Miss Comerío, Tania Rodríguez, previously placed 2nd runner-up at Miss Teen International 2004.
- Miss Santurce, Maria De Lourdes Marino, previously won the contest of La Cara De Imagen L'Oreal 2004.
