= Kimberly Jiménez =

Dominican-Puerto Rican model (born 1997)

- Born: Kímberly Marie Jiménez Rodríguez; February 20, 1997 (age 29); San Juan, Puerto Rico
- Height: 1.77 m (5 ft 9 1/2 in)
- Beauty pageant titleholder
- Title: Miss Dominican Republic 2020
- Hair color: Black
- Eye color: Green
- Major competitions: Miss Universe Puerto Rico 2017 (2nd Runner-Up); Miss Dominican Republic 2019 (1st Runner-Up); Miss Universe 2020 (4th Runner-Up)

Kímberly Marie Jiménez Rodríguez (born February 20, 1997) is a Dominican-Puerto Rican actress, model and beauty pageant titleholder who was crowned Miss Dominican Republic 2020. As Miss Dominican Republic, Jiménez represented the Dominican Republic at Miss Universe 2020, where she placed fourth runner-up.

== Personal life ==
Jiménez works as a model and actress. She is the daughter of a Dominican father and a Puerto Rican mother, and she has dual citizenship in the Dominican Republic and the United States. She is one of the founding members of the Dominican Republic Women's Club.

== Pageantry ==
Jiménez began her pageantry career representing Dorado in the Miss Universe Puerto Rico 2017 competition held at the Centro de Bellas Artes Luis A. Ferré in San Juan, Puerto Rico on May 4, 2017. During the National Costume show, she dressed in an elaborate crystal-beaded pink gown allusive to a jíbara, made by Venezuelan designer Douglas Tapia. However, during her performance her platform shoes got tangled in her flowing skirt, causing her to lose her balance and fall to the ground. Although it likely contributed to her loss (to eventual winner Danna Hernández), she placed as the second runner-up. Jiménez represented La Romana during the Miss Dominican Republic 2019 pageant, held at the Teatro Nacional in Santo Domingo on August 18, 2019. She placed as the first runner-up and lost to eventual winner Clauvid Dály. She was also awarded the "Best Body" and "Miss Reality Show" special awards.

On September 28, 2020, Jiménez was announced and appointed as Miss Dominican Republic 2020. On May 13, 2021, she took part in the National Costume Competition, for which she wore a "Goddess of Sunflowers" costume designed by Axel Thomas that received positive reviews, although some commentators noted that one of the sunflowers of her costume fell off and was lying behind her on the stage during her performance. She is the fifth woman of predominantly African heritage to represent the Dominican Republic in Miss Universe after Ruth Ocumárez in 2002, Ada de la Cruz in 2009, Yaritza Reyes in 2013 and Clauvid Dály in 2019 and the first time in consecutive years. She finished 5th among contestants from 73 countries, and she also won the "Carnival Spirit Award".

Awards and achievements
Preceded by (Colombia) Gabriela Tafur (Thailand) Paweensuda Drouin (Top 5)	Miss Universe 4th Runner-Up; 2020	Succeeded by (Colombia) Valeria Ayos (Philippines) Beatrice Gomez (Top 5)
Preceded by Clauvid Dály	Dominican delegate to Miss Universe; 2020	Succeeded by Debbie Áflalo
Preceded by Clauvid Dály	Miss Universe Dominican Republic; 2020	Succeeded by Andreina Martínez
Preceded by Tania Martínez	Miss Dominican Republic 1st Runner-Up; 2019	Succeeded by Debbie Áflalo
Preceded by Maria Celeste Vargas	Miss La Romana Universe; 2019	Succeeded by Érika Silverio
Preceded by Heilymar Rosario (San Juan)	Miss Universe Puerto Rico 2nd Runner-Up; 2017	Succeeded by Alexandra Porrata (Ponce)
Preceded by Stephanie Román	Miss Dorado Universe; 2017	Succeeded by Keyshla Maisonet
