= Miss Universe Puerto Rico 2017 =

Beauty pageant edition

- Date: 4 May 2017
- Presenters: Jaime Mayol
- Venue: Centro de Bellas Artes Luis A. Ferré, Santurce, San Juan, Puerto Rico
- Broadcaster: WAPA-TV
- Entrants: 40
- Placements: 12
- Winner: Danna Hernández; San Juan
- Best National Costume: Tanya Marie Romero, Carolina
- Photogenic: Layla Velázquez, Peñuelas

Miss Universe Puerto Rico 2017 was the 62nd Miss Universe Puerto Rico pageant, held at the Centro de Bellas Artes Luis A. Ferré in Santurce in San Juan, Puerto Rico, on May 4, 2017.

Brenda Jiménez of Aguadilla crowned Danna Hernández of San Juan at the end of the event. Hernández represented Puerto Rico at the Miss Universe 2017 pageant, where she was unplaced.

== Results ==
=== Placements ===
Placement	Contestant
Miss Universe Puerto Rico 2017	San Juan – Danna Hernández Valentín
1st Runner-Up	Ponce – Jailenne Rivera
2nd Runner-Up	Dorado – Kimberly Jiménez
3rd Runner-Up	Aibonito – Gretchen Colón
4th Runner-Up	Río Grande – Ivana Carolina Irizarry Fritany
Top 12	Caguas – Nicole Marie Colon; Carolina – Tanya Marie Romero; Fajardo – Génesis Concepción; Guayama – Natacha Marie Romero; Guaynabo – Karla Aponte; San Germán – Camille Alexandra Acosta; Utuado – Beverly Rodriguez

=== Special Awards ===
Special Awards	Contestant
Best in Self-Presentation	Utuado – Beverly Rodriguez
Miss Fashionista Sears	Carolina – Tanya Marie Romero; Aibonito – Gretchen Colon Morales
Best Answer	Guaynabo – Karla Aponte; Guánica – Lilliriel Rivera

== Contestants ==
40 candidates representing a municipality competed for the title:

- Adjuntas – Cristal Molina
- Aguadilla – Tayra Soto
- Aibonito – Gretchen Colon Morales
- Añasco – Mariam Saffar
- Arroyo – Niomi Cora
- Barranquitas – Pamela Rivera
- Bayamón – Von Marie Santiago
- Cabo Rojo – Stephanie Font
- Caguas – Nicole Marie Colon Rivera
- Carolina - Tanya Marie Romero
- Cayey – Patricia Lespier
- Coamo – Michelle Rivera
- Corozal – Chris Navarro
- Dorado – Kímberly Jiménez
- Fajardo – Génesis Concepción
- Florida – Rashelle Miranda
- Guánica - Lilliriel Rivera
- Guayama – Natcha Romero
- Guaynabo – Karla Victoria Aponte
- Hatillo – Zudelys Lago
- Humacao – Sabrina Brito
- Isabela – Francheska Fuentes
- Jayuya – Gabriela Pérez
- Juana Díaz – Shakira Maldonado
- Lajas – Nidlla Mercado
- Las Piedras – Angélica Rodríguez
- Mayagüez – Cristal Olavarría
- Naranjito – Michelle Torres
- Orocovis – Nishayra Santiago
- Patillas – Charlene Ortiz
- Peñuelas – Layla Velázquez
- Ponce – Kimberly Marie Jimenez
- Rincón – Sara Rivera
- Río Grande – Ivana Carolina Irizarry Fritany
- Salinas – Natalie Soto
- San Germán – Camille Alexandra Acosta Ortiz
- San Juan – Danna Hernández
- Santa Isabel – Elijah Rodríguez
- Utuado – Beverly Marie Rodriguez De Leon
- Villalba – Kathleen Torres

== See also ==
- Miss Universe Puerto Rico

Preceded by {{{before}}}	Miss Universe Puerto Rico; 2017	Succeeded by 2018
