= 200 Cartas =

2013 Puerto Rican independent film

- Film poster
- Directed by: Bruno Irizarry
- Produced by: Javier Enrique Pérez; Puerto Rico Film Commission (Executive)
- Starring: Lin-Manuel Miranda; Jaime Camil; Dayanara Torres; Monica Steuer; Mayra Matos Pérez
- Cinematography: Raoul Germain
- Edited by: Pedro Javier Muñiz
- Music by: Gerónimo Mercado
- Production company: Vanguardia Films
- Distributed by: Puerto Rico Film Commission
- Release dates: June 2013 (New York City); September 12, 2013 (Puerto Rico)
- Running time: 99 minutes
- Country: Puerto Rico
- Languages: Spanish, English
- Box office: $1 million

200 Cartas (released worldwide as Looking for María Sánchez) is a 2013 bilingual independent Puerto Rican film, written and directed by Bruno Irizarry, starring Lin-Manuel Miranda, Jaime Camil, Dayanara Torres, Monica Steuer and Mayra Matos Pérez.

== Synopsis ==
Struggling nuyorican comic book artist Raúl (Lin-Manuel Miranda) meets a woman named María Sánchez (Mayra Matos Pérez), who's visiting from Puerto Rico, at a bar in New York City and immediately falls in love with her. After the two part ways and María returns to Puerto Rico, Raúl seeks his friend and coworker Juan (Jaime Camil) to help him find her. They both travel to Puerto Rico to search for María Sánchez, only to find that there are two hundred women with that same name in the phone book. During their search, Yolanda (Dayanara Torres) meets Raúl and Juan and offers to help Raúl find the love of his life. Raúl then comes up with writing 200 letters addressed to each María Sánchez found in the phone book and personally contacting or meeting the ones who respond, in hopes of finding the María he met in New York City.

== Cast ==
- Lin-Manuel Miranda as Raúl
- Jaime Camil as Juan
- Dayanara Torres as Yolanda
- Monica Steuer as Rebeca
- Mayra Matos Pérez as María Sánchez
- Víctor Alicea as the husband
- Jonathan Louis Ramos as Tito
- Marisé Alvarez as Sara
- Neville Archambault as Scary Man
- Iris Chacón as the Santera
- Bruno Irizarry as Marcos
- Juan Manuel Lebrón as Don Armando
- Luis Raúl as Pedro

== Production ==
Filmed over 17 days in New York and Puerto Rico, the movie grossed an estimated $1 million after its release in June 2013 in New York City, its World Premieres Film Festival showing in the Philippines in July 2013 and its premiere in Puerto Rico in September 2013.

== Reception ==
The film received positive reception from The New York Times and The Hollywood Reporter, with The Hollywood Reporter noting that "this is an enjoyable, lighthearted effort that should well please Hispanic audiences in particular."
