= Karla Aponte =

Puerto Rican model and beauty pageant titleholder

- Born: Karla Victoria Aponte Colón; 1998 (age 27–28); Guaynabo, Puerto Rico
- Height: 1.73 m (5 ft 8 in)
- Beauty pageant titleholder
- Title: Miss Earth Puerto Rico 2017
- Hair color: Blonde
- Eye color: Green
- Major competitions: Miss Universe Puerto Rico 2017 (Top 12) (Best Answer); Miss Earth Puerto Rico 2017 (Winner); Miss Earth 2017 (Unplaced) (Miss JACMI) (Best in Eco-Video Presentation) (Long Gown Competition) (Swimsuit Competition)
Association football career
- Position: Forward
International career^{‡}
Years	Team	Apps	(Gls)
2015	Puerto Rico U20	1+	(1)
- ‡ National team caps and goals as of 21 June 2015

Karla Victoria Aponte Colón (born 1998) is a Puerto Rican model, beauty pageant titleholder and former footballer. She was crowned Miss Earth Puerto Rico 2017 on August 9, 2017 at La Concha Renaissance Hotel in Condado, San Juan, Puerto Rico, she represented Puerto Rico at the Miss Earth 2017 pageant.

== Pageantary ==
=== Miss Universe Puerto Rico 2017 ===
Aponte recently competed in Miss Universe Puerto Rico 2017 competition where she placed in the Top 10.

=== Miss Earth Puerto Rico 2017 ===
In 2017, Aponte joined and won the Miss Earth Puerto Rico 2017 pageant wherein she succeeded Franceska Toro.

=== Miss Earth 2017 ===
Aponte represented Puerto Rico in the Miss Earth 2017 pageant in the Philippines, she did not place among the finalists.

== Football career ==
Aponte has represented Puerto Rico at the 2015 CONCACAF Women's U-20 Championship qualification, scoring once.

Awards and achievements
Preceded by Franceska Toro	Miss Earth Puerto Rico; 2017	Succeeded by Krystal Xamairy
