= Beverly Rodríguez =

Puerto Rican model

- Born: 23 August 1994 (age 32); Ponce, Puerto Rico
- Education: Pontificia Universidad Católica de Puerto Rico
- Occupation: Actress • Model
- Height: 1.78 m (5 ft 10 in)
- Beauty pageant titleholder
- Title: Miss International Puerto Rico 2017
- Hair color: Dark Brown
- Eye color: Brown
- Major competitions: Miss Universe Puerto Rico 2017 (Top 12); Miss International Puerto Rico 2017 (Winner); Miss International 2017 (Withdraw)

Beverly Marie Rodríguez de León (born 23 August 1994 in Ponce, Puerto Rico) is a Puerto Rican model and beauty pageant titleholder who was crowned Miss International Puerto Rico 2017.

== Early life ==
Beverly was born and raised in Ponce, Puerto Rico and graduated at Pontificia Universidad Católica de Puerto Rico of Certified Public Accountant.

== Pageantry ==
=== Miss International Puerto Rico 2017 ===
Beverly was crowned Miss International Puerto Rico 2017 and she will represent Puerto Rico at this year's Miss International 2017 Pageant in Japan.

=== Miss International 2017 ===
Beverly withdrew from representing Puerto Rico at Miss International 2017, because of the hurricanes that affected the island.

== Summary ==
Beauty Pageants
Year	Title	Placement
2017	Miss Universe Puerto Rico 2017	Top 12
2017	Miss International Puerto Rico 2017	Winner
