= Daniela Blume =

Spanish radio personality

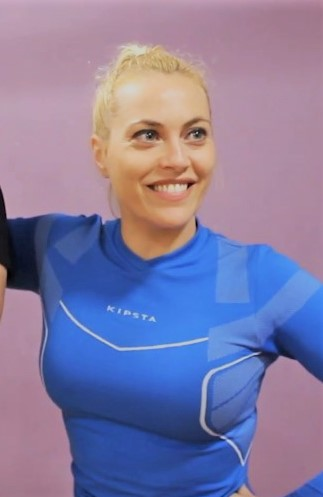
Daniela Blume in 2017

Daniela Blume (born 9 February 1985 in Barcelona) is a Spanish sex therapist and radio presenter and pornstar, named the 13th sexiest woman in the world by readers of FHM in Spain. Her birthname is Alexandra García, she moved to Canada and studied her Sexology career there.

== History ==
After her return from study in Canada, she worked as a stripper in the Sala Bagdad of Barcelona, and later she worked in the program Crónicas marcianas, until the end of issue (in July 2005). Despite this, she continued in Telecinco, when she was a reporter in the program "TNT", directed by Jordi González. Also at the time, she was a stripper in the program Condició femenina of Canal Català and she worked as a sexologist.

In June 2007, she posed in Interviú magazine. From September 2007 until July 2013, she was an announcer on the radio program: Ponte a Prueba in the Europa FM station. In 2009, she wrote with director of program, Uri Sabat a book entitled: El Manual de Ponte a Prueba.

In 2009, she participated in the Telecinco program Supervivientes: Perdidos en Honduras. In this program, she was the eighth to be expelled after being on that island for 57 days. In that same year, she occasionally collaborated in the program leading Telecinco: Sálvame. In the summer of 2011, she was the host of a TV program on Antena 3, Comer, beber y amar.

== Recent career ==
In 2013, she participated in the program of Antena 3, Splash! Famosos al agua. Daniela came to the end of the TV show. There, in the end, she made ½ somersault pike. For that leap, the jury scored by 9.5, the highest score of the show, but the public decided that the winner was Gervasio Deferr (winner of three Olympic medals), so Daniela was third.

Since 26 August, she has collaborated with Uri Sabat in a new radio show No te cortes, on the station Los 40 Principales.
