= Mónica Pastrana =

Puerto Rican model (born 1989)

- Born: Mónica Cristina Pastrana González; September 6, 1989 (age 37); Manatí, Puerto Rico
- Height: 5 ft 10 in (1.78 m)
- Beauty pageant titleholder
- Title: Miss Arecibo Universe 2009; Miss Puerto Rico International 2009
- Hair color: Blonde
- Eye color: Brown
- Major competitions: Miss Puerto Rico Universe 2009 (Semi-finalist, top 20); Nuestra Belleza Latina 2009 (Finalist, 7th place); Miss International 2009

Mónica Pastrana (born September 6, 1989) is a Puerto Rican actress, TV and radio host, and beauty pageant titleholder. She was one of the hosts of the show "Locas de Atar" in Univision Puerto Rico until it was cancelled in 2012. Now she works as a comedian in Raymond Y Sus Amigos in Telemundo Puerto Rico.

== Beauty pageants ==
=== Miss Puerto Rico Universe 2009 ===
On October 22, 2008, Mónica competed at the Miss Puerto Rico Universe 2009 pageant representing the city of Arecibo. Mónica became one of the twenty semi-finalists.

=== Nuestra Belleza Latina ===
In the spring of 2009 Mónica competed in the reality show/contest Nuestra Belleza Latina 2009. Mónica became one of the final twelve finalists in which she then finished in seventh place.

=== Miss International 2009 ===
On November 28, 2009, Mónica competed at the Miss International 2009 pageant representing her country Puerto Rico, where she did not place.

Preceded by Miriam Pabón	Miss International Puerto Rico; 2009	Succeeded by Aideliz Hidalgo
