= Andreína Martínez =

Dominican beauty pageant titleholder

Andreina Martínez
- Born: Andreína Martínez Founier; Santiago de los Caballeros, Santiago, Dominican Republic
- Education: City College of New York (BA)
- Height: 5 ft 11.5 in (182 cm)
- Beauty pageant titleholder
- Title: Miss Dominican Republic 2022
- Hair color: Brown
- Eye color: Brown
- Major competitions: Miss República Dominicana US 2021; (Winner); Miss Dominican Republic 2021; (Winner); Miss Universe 2022; (2nd Runner-Up)

Andreína Martínez Founier-Tejada is a Dominican-American model and beauty pageant titleholder who was crowned Miss Dominican Republic 2021 and represented the Dominican Republic at Miss Universe 2022, reaching second runner-up.

== Biography ==
Martínez was born in Santiago de los Caballeros, Dominican Republic and raised in New York City, United States. She emigrated with her father and her brother at the age of 13 to a small apartment in the Bronx, while her mother stayed in the Dominican Republic at that time. She attended Bronx Bridges High School where she was the captain of the school's softball team. After high school, she attended the City College of New York, City University of New York, where she graduated summa cum laude a bachelor's degree in Psychology and Latin American studies.

During her modeling career, she has participated in New York Fashion Week and has been the face of renowned brands like Missoni, Nars Cosmetics, and Sephora. In 2018, she got connected to the United States Congress, where she worked as a legislative intern in Senator Kirsten Gillibrand's office, in Washington D. C. She also worked as a legislative budget intern at the New York City Council. Thanks to this work, she received backing from the United States government for her Miss Universe candidacy.

She has also worked as an ambassador for America Needs You, a non-profit organization based in New York. She currently runs the Women's Equality Center, a nonprofit organization that works to promote and defend women's rights in Latin America and the Caribbean.

== Pageantry ==
=== Miss Dominican Republic 2021 ===
Martínez won Miss Dominican Republic 2021 on November 7, 2021, at the Salón de Eventos Sambil in Santo Domingo de Guzman. She was crowned by the former winner Kimberly Jiménez.

However, shortly before her participation in Miss Universe 2021, she was replaced by Debbie Aflalo, the first runner-up of the national contest, who took her place as the Dominican representative in that edition, after Martínez allegedly tested positive for COVID-19 shortly before the pageant. Years later, the director of Miss Dominican Republic, Magali Febles, admitted that she didn’t actually catch the virus, but that Febles used that excuse so Martínez would have more preparation time. Later on, Martínez was appointed to represent the Dominican Republic in the 2022 edition.

=== Miss Universe 2022 ===
Martínez was designated as Miss Dominican Republic 2022 and competed at Miss Universe 2022, held at the Ernest N. Morial Convention Center in New Orleans, United States, where out of 84 participating women, Martínez ended up as the second runner-up.

== Career ==
=== Victoria’s Secret: Angels Among Us ===
Martínez participated in Victoria’s Secret: Angels Among Us, a reality competition broadcast on YouTube that attracted more than 100,000 participants worldwide. She advanced to the top three finalists alongside Solange Omon of Cameroon and New York native Tatyana Tinsley. The competition offered the winner an opportunity to walk in the 2026 Victoria’s Secret Fashion Show and an exclusive contract with IMG Models. Omon ultimately won the competition. Despite not winning, Martínez subsequently walked in the 2026 Victoria’s Secret Fashion Show, marking a milestone in her international modeling career.

Awards and achievements
Preceded by (South Africa) Lalela Mswane	Miss Universe 2nd Runner-Up; 2022	Succeeded by (Australia) Moraya Wilson
Preceded by Debbie Áflalo	Dominican delegate to Miss Universe; 2022	Succeeded by Mariana Downing
Preceded by Kimberly Jiménez	Miss Dominican Republic; 2021	Succeeded by Mariana Downing
Preceded by Casandra Coradín	Miss Dominican Republic USA; 2021	Succeeded by Celinda Ortega
