= Luis Sandoval (broadcaster) =

Mexican actor, reporter, and entertainer

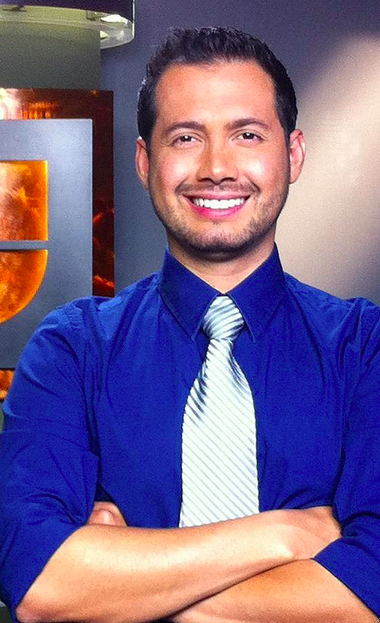
Luis Sandoval

Luis Raúl Sandoval Vallejo (born 20 October 1980) is a Mexican actor, reporter and entertainer. He is currently a reporter for the morning TV Show ¡Despierta América!, a production of Univision, and a co-host to the Buena Vibra Morning Show on K-Love 107.5 FM KLVE radio station in Los Angeles. He was also the host for the TV show "Lánzate" from Telefutura (now known as UniMás).

== Career ==
Sandoval was born in Nayarit, Mexico, but left at the age of 17 to pursue his studies of communication at the Autonomous University of Baja California UABC. He eventually arrived in the United States at the age of 22, He began his professional career as an assistant for the morning show "Piolín por la Mañana," and later he was cast to be the star reporter based in Los Angeles for the national morning show Despierta America where he currently works.

In December 2013, Sandoval interviewed the singer Britney Spears on Despierta America, and asked what her favorite aspect of Latino culture was, Spears replied that Latinos were "very sexy," and they made her think of the typical "bad boy" type that fathers warn daughters against. Spears' responses in the interview were criticized online, including by Fox News Latino, the Latin Times and the International Business Times.

As of March 31, 2025, Sandoval co-hosts the morning radio show "Buena Vibra" on K-LOVE 107.5 FM in Los Angeles, where he shares the microphone with Erika Reyna and new co-host Alejandra Espinoza, as reported by the Los Angeles Times en Español. The show is noted for its comedic, interactive, and refreshing focus on topics relevant to the local Latino community.

== Personal life ==
On October 11, 2018 (National coming out day), Sandoval came out as gay on ¡Despierta América! and shares his personal story to honor the memory of Jamel Myles. On June 19, 2021, Sandoval married Renato Pérez.

== Awards and nominations ==
- In 2014, Despierta America was nominated for an Emmy Award for Outstanding Morning Program in Spanish, with Sandoval (as director, general producer and correspondent) named as part of the team responsible.
- In 2018, Sandoval received a Daytime Emmy for his contribution to “¡Despierta América!” and a Los Angeles Area Emmy for his work on “Rose Parade” live broadcast.
- In 2019, he was a recipient of a GLAAD Media Award in the category of Outstanding TV Journalism – Newsmagazine (Spanish-Language) at the 30th annual GLAAD ceremony.
