= Zashely Alicea =

Puerto Rican beauty pageant titleholder (born 2000)

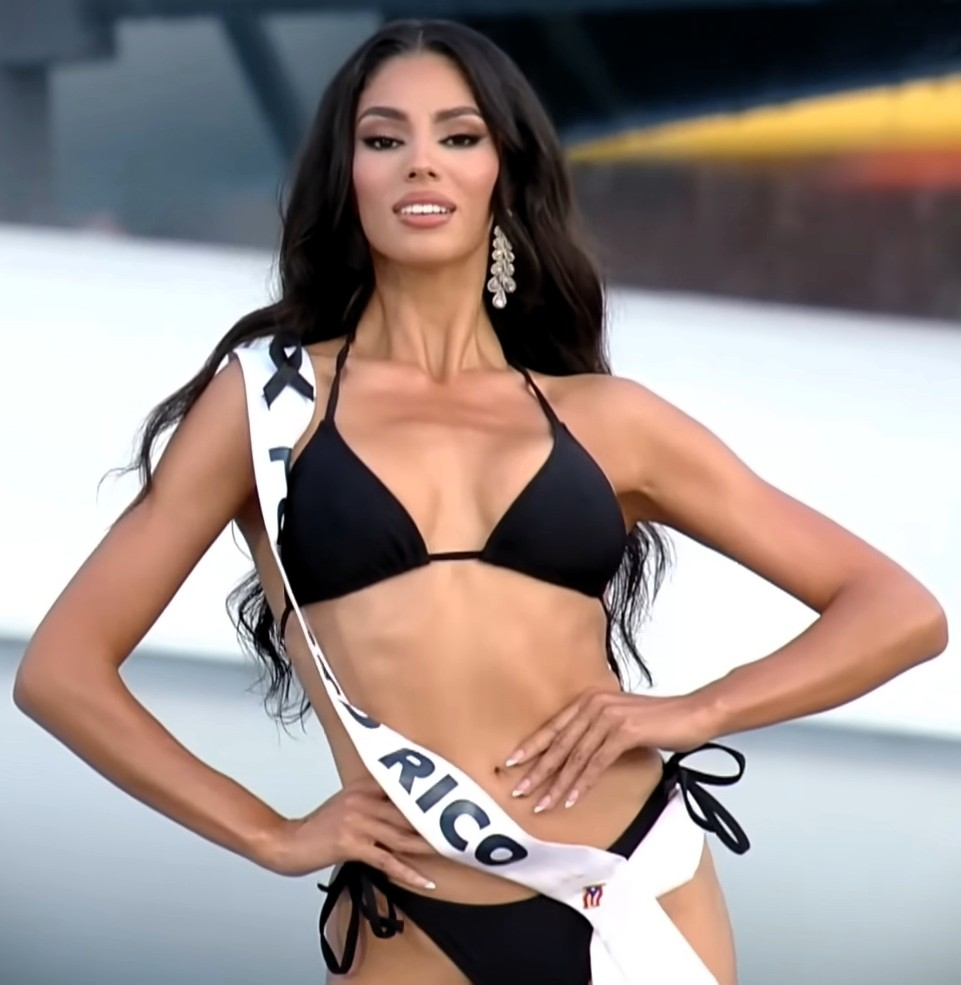
- Alicea in 2025
- Born: Zashely Nicole Alicea; San Juan, Puerto Rico
- Education: University of Puerto Rico (BS)
- Beauty pageant titleholder
- Title: Miss Universe Puerto Rico 2025
- Major competitions: Miss Universe Puerto Rico 2025; (Winner); Miss Universe 2025; (Top 12)

Zashely Nicole Alicea Rivera is a Puerto Rican beauty pageant titleholder who won Miss Universe Puerto Rico 2025.

== Early life ==
Zashely Nicole Alicea Rivera was born in 1999, in San Juan, Puerto Rico, where she was raised and educated. She graduated with a bachelor's degree in psychology from the University of Puerto Rico, Río Piedras Campus.

Alicea was an athlete in artistic gymnastics for 10 years. She represented Puerto Rico at competitions in Las Vegas and Orlando. As a member of the junior gymnastics team, she also participated at the 2008 Pan American Club Championships, held in Puerto Rico. She was later selected to be part of the Puerto Rican youth team in 2013.

She began her dance training in 2009 at the Julián E. Blanco Specialized Ballet School, where she graduated from level eight. In 2011, she joined the Mauro Ballet school. In 2014, she became a soloist with the Youth Company. In 2017, she joined the company as a semi-soloist, where she was later promoted to soloist, her current role.

== Pageantry ==
=== Miss Universe Puerto Rico 2025 ===
Alicea won Miss Universe Puerto Rico 2025, at the Luis A. Ferré Performing Arts Center, on August 14, 2025. She was crowned by her predecessor Jennifer Colón. At the preliminary competition, She won Miss Total Look Runway and Best Fashion Runway.

=== Miss Universe 2025 ===
Alicea represented Puerto Rico at Miss Universe 2025 in Thailand, and reached the top 12.

Awards and achievements
| Preceded by Jennifer Colón, Orocovis | Miss Universe Puerto Rico; 2025 | Succeeded by Jennifer Barreto, San Sebastián |
