= Kiara Ortega =

Puerto Rican model and beauty pageant titleholder

- Born: Kiara Liz Ortega Delgado; August 23, 1993 (age 33); Rincón, Puerto Rico
- Beauty pageant titleholder
- Title: Miss Universe Puerto Rico 2018
- Major competitions: Miss Universe Puerto Rico 2018; (Winner); Miss Universe 2018; (Top 5)

Kiara Liz Ortega Delgado (born August 23, 1993) is a Puerto Rican dancer and beauty pageant titleholder who was crowned Miss Universe Puerto Rico 2018. She represented Puerto Rico at the Miss Universe 2018 pageant held in Bangkok, Thailand. She finished in the Top 5 at Miss Universe 2018. She also participated in a reality dancing show called Mira quién baila (American TV series) where she won the 8th season of the competition.

== Personal life ==
Ortega was born in San Juan, Puerto Rico. She works for an organization named Centro Inés which provides different educational, recreational and support services for children and seniors to help develop a sense of independence, creativity, and mastery of skills.

== Pageantry ==
On 20 September 2018, Ortega began her pageantry career representing Rincón in the Miss Universe Puerto Rico 2018 competition at Luis A. Ferré Performing Arts Center in San Juan, where she was crowned as Miss Universe Puerto Rico 2018. She succeeded outgoing Miss Universe Puerto Rico 2017 Danna Hernández. Ortega is also the third woman with noticeably mixed (African and Indigenous) features to win Miss Universe Puerto Rico after Alba Reyes in 2004 and Zuleyka Rivera in 2006. Ortega represented Puerto Rico at Miss Universe 2018 pageant in Bangkok, Thailand, finishing in the Top 5, effectively ending a 4-year drought for Puerto Rico and giving the Island its first top five placement since 2009 when Mayra Matos finished as fourth runner-up.

In 2018 Kiara wore a costume to represent Puerto Rico which featured the Puerto Rican flag colors, three pairs of hands and a star for a headdress.

Awards and achievements
Preceded by (Thailand) Maria Ehren (Venezuela) Keysi Sayago	Miss Universe Top 5 Finalist (with (Vietnam) H'Hen Niê); 2018	Succeeded by (Colombia) Gabriela Tafur (Thailand) Paweensuda Drouin
Preceded by Danna Hernández, San Juan	Miss Universe Puerto Rico; 2018	Succeeded by Madison Anderson, Toa Baja
Preceded by Sara Rivera	Miss Rincón Universe; 2018	Succeeded by Incumbent
