= Miss Universe Puerto Rico 2018 =

Beauty pageant edition

- Date: September 20, 2018
- Presenters: Jaime Mayol; Cynthia Olavarría; William Valdés
- Entertainment: Calma Carmona; Mau y Ricky; Hermanos Cepeda
- Venue: Luis A. Ferré Fine Arts Center, San Juan, Puerto Rico
- Broadcaster: WAPA-TV
- Entrants: 29
- Placements: 16
- Winner: Kiara Liz Ortega; Rincón

Miss Universe Puerto Rico 2018 was the 63rd Miss Universe Puerto Rico pageant, held at the Luis A. Ferré Fine Arts Center in San Juan, Puerto Rico, on September 20, 2018.

Danna Hernández of San Juan crowned Kiara Ortega of Rincón as her successor at the end of the event. Ortega represented Puerto Rico at Miss Universe 2018 and placed in the Top 5. While the first runner-up competed in Miss Charm 2023 and placed in the Top 10.

== Result ==
=== Placements ===
Placement	Contestant
Miss Universe Puerto Rico 2018	Rincón – Kiara Ortega
1st Runner-Up	Vega Baja – Alejandra Pagán
2nd Runner-Up	Ponce – Alexandra Porrata
Top 6	Arecibo – Yuanilie Alvarado; Dorado – Keyshla Maysonet ∆; Fajardo – Larissa Santiago
Top 10	Guaynabo – Viviana Sepúlveda; Orocovis – Mayde Columna; Toa Baja – Yolimar Lara; Vieques – Melissa Ayala
Top 16	Aguada – Daniella Rodríguez; Aguadilla – Mia Robles; Añasco – Koral Irizarry; Lares – Ashley Ríos §; San Juan – Nashley Pariente; Yabucoa – Ledlyn Charriez

- § – Voted into the Top 16 via online voting
- ∆ – Voted into the Top 6 via Twitter voting

== Contestants ==
Official 29 finalists of Miss Universe Puerto Rico 2018:

Municipality	Contestant	Age	Height	Placement
Aguada	Daniella Rodríguez	20	5 ft 8 in (173 cm)	Top 16
Aguadilla	Mia Robles	20	5 ft 8 in (173 cm)	Top 16
Añasco	Koral Irizarry	23	5 ft 5 in (165 cm)	Top 16
Arecibo	Yuanilie Alvarado	21	5 ft 7 in (170 cm)	Top 6
Arroyo	Irisnelys Rivera	18	5 ft 5 in (165 cm)	
Bayamón	Ashley Rivera	22	5 ft 5 in (165 cm)	
Canóvanas	Krystal Badillo	22	5 ft 7 in (170 cm)	
Cataño	Natalia Colón Figueroa	21	5 ft 6 in (168 cm)	
Ciales	Ana Sofía Martí	22	5 ft 6 in (168 cm)	
Corozal	Kyamara Monroig	22	5 ft 9 in (175 cm)	
Dorado	Keyshla Maisonet	25	6 ft 0 in (183 cm)	Top 6
Fajardo	Larissa Santiago	27	5 ft 8 in (173 cm)	Top 6
Guayama	Jehanna López	24	5 ft 7 in (170 cm)	
Guaynabo	Viviana Sepúlveda	25	5 ft 7 in (170 cm)	Top 10
Hatillo	Yadira Muriel	26	5 ft 5 in (165 cm)	
Lares	Ashley Ríos	26	5 ft 5 in (165 cm)	Top 16
Mayagüez	Alice González	26	5 ft 8 in (173 cm)	
Naranjito	Sabrina Rodríguez	20	5 ft 5 in (165 cm)	
Orocovis	Mayde Columna	27	5 ft 7 in (170 cm)	Top 10
Ponce	Alexandra Porrata	23	6 ft 0 in (183 cm)	2nd Runner-up
Quebradillas	Mariel Ocasio	20	5 ft 5 in (165 cm)	
Rincón	Kiara Ortega	25	5 ft 7 in (170 cm)	Miss Universe Puerto Rico 2018
Río Grande	Zugeily Quiñones	18	5 ft 6 in (168 cm)	
San Juan	Nashley Pariente	21	5 ft 5 in (165 cm)	Top 16
Toa Baja	Yolimar Lara	24	5 ft 9 in (175 cm)	Top 10
Trujillo Alto	Karla Díaz	25	5 ft 6 in (168 cm)	
Vega Baja	Alejandra Pagán	18	5 ft 7 in (170 cm)	1st Runner-up
Vieques	Melissa Ayala	25	5 ft 7 in (170 cm)	Top 10
Yabucoa	Ledlyn Charriez	21	5 ft 7 in (170 cm)	Top 16

=== Notes ===
- Kiara Ortega competed in Miss Universe 2018 and placed as Top 5.
- While Alejandra Pagan competed in Miss Charm 2023 and placed as Top 10.
- While Yuanilie Alvarado was one of the Top 6 competed in Reina Hispanoamericana 2019 and placed as 2nd Runner-up.

== See also ==
- Miss Universe Puerto Rico

Preceded by {{{before}}}	Miss Universe Puerto Rico; 2018	Succeeded by 2019
