= Uma Blasini =

Puerto Rican beauty pageant titleholder

- Born: Wilmadilis Blasini Pérez; March 4, 1982 (age 44); Ponce, Puerto Rico
- Other name: Uma Blasini
- Height: 6 ft 1 in (1.85 m)
- Spouse: Abel Misla (m. 2012)
- Children: 2
- Beauty pageant titleholder
- Title: Miss San Juan Universe 2005; Miss Guayanilla Universe 2007; Miss Puerto Rico Universe 2007
- Hair color: Blonde
- Eye color: Brown
- Major competitions: Miss Puerto Rico Universe 2005 (4th Runner-Up); Miss Puerto Rico Universe 2007 (Winner); Miss Universe 2007 (Unplaced); Miss Continente Americano 2007 (Top 6); Miss Tourism Queen International 2007

Wilmadilis Blasini Pérez (born March 4, 1982 in Ponce) best known as Uma Blasini is a Puerto Rican beauty pageant titleholder who represented Puerto Rico at the Miss Universe 2007 beauty pageant.

== Early years ==
Blasini was born March 4, 1982, in Ponce, Puerto Rico, and raised in Guayanilla. She was born to Arab parents, Mohamad Blasini and Ayesha Pérez.

== Career ==
A thyroid cancer survivor, Blasini competed in the Miss Puerto Rico Universe pageant in 2005, representing San Juan, and reached the 4th Runner-up position. Two years later, she went on to compete at the Miss Puerto Rico Universe pageant yet again, representing her home town Guayanilla. This time she won the crown and became the new Miss Puerto Rico Universe 2007. She was crowned by Zuleyka Rivera, who held the Miss Puerto Rico Universe 2006 title before she was crowned Miss Universe 2006.

Uma then travelled to Mexico to compete at Miss Universe 2007. She was unplaced at the pageant, which was won by Riyo Mori, Miss Japan.

She also represented Puerto Rico at Miss Continente Americano 2007 in Ecuador, where she placed in the Top 6, and at the Miss Tourism Queen International 2007 in China where she won the Best Long Gown Award.

== Tallest ==
Blasini holds the record for the tallest Miss Puerto Rico at 6 ft 2 in (1.88 m).

== Personal life ==
In 2012, Blasini married long time boyfriend Abel Misla. In that same year they had their first child, Fabian Esteban.

== Photofake of Maria Putina ==
British newspaper Daily Mirror published a controversial article by PHIL BOOTH named "Maria Putin: Everything you need to know about Vladimir Putin's daughter as she flees Dutch home" (dated 25 July 2014) about the oldest daughter of Vladimir Putin and her secret life in the Netherlands. The on-line version of that article can be found here: https://www.mirror.co.uk/news/world-news/maria-putin-everything-you-need-3912791 The article made quite a sensation and news-storm in Russian mass-media but no legal claim from Russian Federation to the newspaper was made. The first photo in the article pretending to represent Maria Putina (http://i1.mirror.co.uk/incoming/article3913555.ece/ALTERNATES/s615/PAY-Maria-Putin.jpg) but it is Uma Blasini. She didn't made any legal action against newspaper either. Daily Mirror or\and the author never tried to give any excuses for the use of Uma Blasini photo (or the next photos which shows Darja Zakharova together with Putin and his wife during 2008 election in Moscow).

Awards and achievements
Preceded by Evelisse Fermín	Miss Continente Americano Puerto Rico; 2007	Succeeded by Kristina Ruisánchez
Preceded by Zuleyka Rivera (Salinas)	Miss Puerto Rico Universe; 2007	Succeeded by Ingrid Rivera (Dorado)
Preceded by Jeimimar Ramos	Miss Guayanilla Universe; 2009	Succeeded by Carolina Rodríguez
Preceded by Antoinette Castrillo	Miss San Juan Universe; 2005	Succeeded by Jesenia Tirado
