= Nuestra Belleza Latina 2007 =

- Season 1
- Presented by: Giselle Blondet
- Judges: Osmel Sousa; Carlos Calderon; Alicia Machado
- Winner: Alejandra Espinoza
- Runner-up: Mayra Muñoz
- No. of episodes: 11

Release
- Original network: Univision
- Original release: March 27 – May 25, 2007

Season chronology
- Next → Nuestra Belleza Latina 2008

Nuestra Belleza Latina 2007 is the first season of Nuestra Belleza Latina. After castings around the United States and Puerto Rico 12 finalists moved to Miami and lived together where they received different classes of dancing, runway, diction, teleprompter and physical training. The finalists also competed against each other in different challenges. After each episode of the show was over, the audience at home got to vote for their favorite contestant by phone or text message. Contestants represented themselves, not their countries, therefore it was permissible to have more than one contestant from the same country or have the same nationality. Week by week, the finalist with the lowest votes was eliminated. The winner of the contest won a contract to be one of the new personality faces on many of Univision's programs and award shows, and a chance to win more than $200,000 in cash and prizes and reign as Nuestra Belleza Latina for a year.

Alejandra Espinoza representing Mexico was the first winner.

== Judges ==
- Osmel Sousa
- Carlos Calderon
- Alicia Machado

== Elimination chart ==
Contestants Chart
Top 12	Winner	1st Runner-Up

Safe	Won the challenge of the week	Bottom 3	Bottom 2	Eliminated

Stage:		Finals						Finale
Week:		4/10	4/17	4/24	5/1	5/8	5/15	5/22
Place	Contestant	Result						
1	Alejandra Espinoza	Safe	Safe	Safe	Safe	Safe	Safe	Winner
2	Mayra Muñoz	Safe	Safe	Safe	Safe	Safe	Safe	Runner-Up
3	Yara Lasanta	Safe	Safe	Safe	Safe	Safe	Bottom 3	3rd Place
4	Elizabeth López	Safe	Bottom 3	Bottom 2	Bottom 3	Bottom 2	Safe	4th Place
5	Raengel Solis	Safe	Safe	Safe	Safe	Safe	Safe	5th Place
6	Giselle Saouda	Bottom 3	Safe	Safe	Bottom 2	Safe	Bottom 2	6th Place
7	Madelis Soto	Safe	Safe	Safe	Safe	Bottom 3	7th Place	
8	Angie Chavez	Bottom 2	Safe	Safe	Safe	8th Place		
9	Martha Maria López	Safe	Safe	Bottom 3	9th Place			
10	Joana Parra	Safe	Bottom 2	10th Place				
11	Lorraine Lara	Safe	11th Place					
12	Marlene Alvarez	12th Place						

== Contestants ==
=== Contestants ===
Rank	Contestant
Winner	Alejandra Espinoza
Runner-Up	Mayra Munoz
3rd Place	Yara Lasanta
4th Place	Elizabeth López
5th Place	Raengel Solis
6th Place	Giselle Saouda
7th Place	Madelis Soto
8th Place	Angie Chavez
9th Place	Martha Maria Lopez
10th Place	Joana Parra
11th Place	Lorraine Lara
12th Place	Marlene Alvarez

== Season 1, Episode 1: Castings New York, Los Angeles and Miami ==
The best of the auditions held in New York, Los Angeles and Miami. 'The Guest Judges were:

Judge	Audition Place
Kika Roca	New York City
Angelica Castro	Los Angeles
Cynthia Olavarría	Miami

The following contestants were chosen:

Contestant	Audition Place
Lorraine Lara	New York City
Raengel Solis	New York City
Alejandra Espinoza	Los Angeles
Mayra Muñoz	Los Angeles
Marlene Alvarez	Los Angeles
Martha Maria López	Miami
Giselle Saouda	Miami

== Season 1, Episode 2: Castings Houston, Chicago and P. Rico ==
The best of the auditions held in Houston, Chicago and Puerto Rico. Guest Judges:

Judge	Audition Place
Raul Brindis	Houston
Julian Gil	Puerto Rico
Sara Bustani	Chicago

The following contestants were chosen:

Contestant	Audition Place
Elizabeth López	Houston
Joanna Parra	Houston
Angie Chavez	Chicago
Yara Lasanta	Puerto Rico
Madelis Soto	Puerto Rico

== Season 1, Episode 3: Finding the 12 Finalists ==
All the selected girls go to Miami. The judges evaluate them on stage and pick their 12 favorites. They hit the runway and the audience gets to vote for the first time The Final 12 are Chosen:

Contestant	Country Representing
Alejandra Espinoza	Mexico
Mayra Muñoz	El Salvador
Yara Lasanta	Puerto Rico
Elizabeth López	Cuba
Raengel Solis	Republica Dominicana
Giselle Saouda	Colombia
Madelis Soto	Puerto Rico
Angie Chavez	Mexico
Martha Maria López	Cuba
Joanna Parra	Venezuela
Lorraine Lara	Puerto Rico
Marlene Alvarez	Mexico

== Season 1, Episode 4: Boot Camp ==
Original Air Date—10 April 2007 The 12 girls move to the "Mansion of the Beauty" where they start their physical training. At the gala, they perform a disco choreography in front of a live audience and walk the runway in bathing suit. At the end of the show, Marlene Alvarez is eliminated.

== Season 1, Episode 5: Univision ID Challenge ==
Original Air Date—17 April 2007 The 11 remaining girls have to face the challenge of the week: Each one of them will have to shoot a 10 secs. ID for the Network. At the gala, they perform a sports themed choreography and walk the runway twice, one wearing cocktail dresses and the other in a sexy outfit. At the end of the show, Lorraine Lara is eliminated.

== Season 1, Episode 6: Obstacle Course Challenge ==
Original Air Date—24 April 2007 The 10 remaining girls have to face the challenge of the week: A tough obstacle course. At the gala, they perform a nationalities themed choreography and walk the runway wearing bathing suits. At the end of the show, Joanna Parra is eliminated.

== Season 1, Episode 7: Maybelline Photo Shoot ==
Original Air Date—1 May 2007 The nine remaining girls are divided in trios to face the challenge of the week: A themed photo-shoot for Maybelline New York. The winning team gets 10.000 dollars to share. At the gala, they perform a Garibaldi themed choreography. By the end of the show, Martha Maria Lopez is eliminated.

== Season 1, Episode 8: Ford TV Ad Challenge ==
Original Air Date—8 May 2007 The eight remaining girls form two teams to face the challenge of the week: They have to create, produce, star and edit a TV commercial for a Ford product. The winning group gets 10.000 dollars to share. At the gala, they perform a 20's themed choreography and hit the runway wearing wedding dresses. By the end of the show, Angie Chavez is eliminated.

== Season 1, Episode 9: JC Penney Fashion Show ==
Original Air Date—15 May 2007 The seven remaining girls face their last challenge: They have a JC Penney store closed for them. The task is to pick two complete outfits (casual and job interview) within the store is less than 15 minutes and perform a fashion show. The sole winner ends up with the 10.000 dollars prize. At the gala, the audience watch taped profiles of each one of the remaining contestants before the final voting. By the end of the show, Madelis Soto is eliminated.

== Season 1, Episode 10: The Big Finale ==
Original Air Date—22 May 2007 This is a results show. The people have voted for their favorite. The six remaining contestants receive a final evaluation by the judges before they get to know their position. At the end of the show, Alejandra Espinoza is crowned as "Nuestra Belleza Latina 2007".

- Winner:Alejandra Espinoza

== Season 1, Episode 11: El destape ==
Original Air Date—25 May 2007 The episode featured deleted and extended scenes, backstage footage, and interviews with the six finalists, the judges, and the teachers.

== Call-Out Order ==
Giselle's Call-Out Order
Order	Episodes											
Order	Top 12	1	2	3	4	5	6	7 (Finale)				Top 2
1	Alejandra	Alejandra	Raengel	Angie	Madelis	Mayra	Raengel	Raengel	Elizabeth	Mayra	Alejandra	Alejandra
2	Mayra	Angie	Alejandra	Elizabeth	Alejandra	Raengel	Yara	Yara	Alejandra	Alejandra	Mayra	Mayra
3	Yara	Raengel	Madelis	Alejandra	Raengel	Alejandra	Alejandra	Mayra	Mayra	Yara	Yara	
4	Elizabeth	Yara	Angie	Yara	Angie	Madelis	Mayra	Alejandra	Yara	Elizabeth		
5	Raengel	Elizabeth	Yara	Martha	Mayra	Elizabeth	Elizabeth	Elizabeth	Raengel			
6	Giselle	Martha	Mayra	Raengel	Yara	Giselle	Giselle	Giselle				
7	Madelis	Mayra	Joana	Mayra	Elizabeth	Yara	Madelis					
8	Angie	Madelis	Martha	Madelis	Giselle	Angie						
9	Martha	Giselle	Elizabeth	Giselle	Martha							
10	Joana	Lorraine	Giselle	Joana								
11	Lorraine	Joana	Lorraine									
12	Marlene	Marlene										

The contestant won the challenge of the week
The contestant was eliminated
The contestant became runner-up
The contestant won the competition

== Contestants notes ==
- Raengel Solis competed Miss Dominican Republic Universe 2009 and finished as 4th Runner-Up.
- Yara Lasanta competed in Miss World Puerto Rico 2009 and finished as 1st Runner-Up. She previously competed in Miss Puerto Rico 2005 where she finished as 4th Runner-Up and then in Miss Puerto Rico 2007 where she finished as 2nd Runner-Up. She competed in Miss World 2010 win Miss World Beach Beauty and placed in Top 25.
- Alejandra Espinoza competed in Nuestra Belleza Mexico 2006 where she finished as 3rd Runner-Up.

Preceded by None	Nuestra Belleza Latina 2007; Alejandra Espinoza	Succeeded by Melissa Marty
