= Miss World Puerto Rico 2008 =

Annual competition was held in Puerto Rico

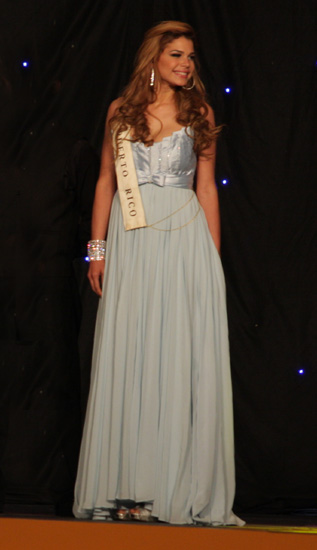
- Ivonne Orsini
- Date: March 27, 2008
- Presenters: Ángela González Adames; Raymond Arrieta
- Venue: San Juan, Puerto Rico
- Broadcaster: Telemundo
- Entrants: 34
- Placements: 13
- Winner: Ivonne Orsini; San Juan

Miss World Puerto Rico 2008 was the 37th Miss World Puerto Rico pageant, held in San Juan, Puerto Rico, on March 27, 2008.

Jennifer Guevara of Orocovis crowned Ivonne Orsini of San Juan as her successor at the end of the event. Orsini represented Puerto Rico in Miss World 2008.

== Results ==
=== Placements ===
Placement	Contestant
Miss World Puerto Rico 2008	San Juan – Ivonne Marie Orsini López
1st Runner-Up	Guaynabo – Melissa Cabral
2nd Runner-Up	Morovis – Maribel Montalvo
3rd Runner-Up	Juncos – Miriam Ivette Pabón
4th Runner-Up	Comerío – Yashira Ayala
Top 13	Aguas Buenas – Ingrid Fernández; Bayamón – Cristina Jirminian; Cabo Rojo – Melanie Alemany; Caguas – Leslian Nieves; Dorado – Karim Morales; Mayagüez – Samaris Ortiz; Naranjito – Yarimar Marrero; Villalba – Leiry Marie Ruiz

=== Awards ===
The winners from these categories advanced as semifinalist.

Award	Contestant
Best in Sports	Aguas Buenas – Ingrid Fernández
Best Body	Juncos – Miriam Pabón
Top Model	Guaynabo – Melissa Cabral
Best Talent	Villalba – Leiry Marie Ruiz
Makeup Competition	San Juan – Ivonne Orsini

== Contestants ==
Aguas Buenas - Ingrid Fernandez

Barceloneta - Dayana Diaz

Bayamón - Cristina Jirminian

Cabo Rojo - Melenie Alemany

Caguas - Leslian Nieves

Canóvanas - Nicole Rodriguez

Carolina - Paulette Lugo

Cayey - Ismarie Rivera

Cidra - Nicole Malave

Coamo - Mariely Rivera

Comerío - Yashira Ayala

Dorado - Karim Morales

Fajardo - Giovanna Morales

Guayanilla - Jennifer Soto

Guaynabo - Melissa Cabral

Isabela - Letty Perez

Juana Díaz - Arlene Morales

Juncos - Miriam Pabon

Lajas - Lizmarie Nazario

Loíza - Luciandra Santana

Mayagüez - Samaris Ortiz

Morovis - Maribel Montalvo

Naranjito - Yarimar Marrero

Orocovis - Soleil Vargas

Peñuelas - Christina Rodriguez

Ponce - Gisela Rodriguez

Río Grande - Gloriliz Rodriguez

San Juan - Ivonne Orsini

Toa Alta - Karem Negron

Toa Baja - Shannei Dilbert

Utuado - Zoraida Figueroa

Vega Baja - Raquel Galbis

Villalba - Leiry Marie Ruiz

Yauco - Giselle Lopez

== Notes ==
- Maribel Montalvo (Morovis) previously placed 3rd Runner-up at the Miss Puerto Rico Universe 2008 pageant.
- Miriam Pabon (Juncos) later became Miss Puerto Rico International 2008 and Miss Puerto Rico America 2010.
