= Alejandra Espinoza =

Mexican model

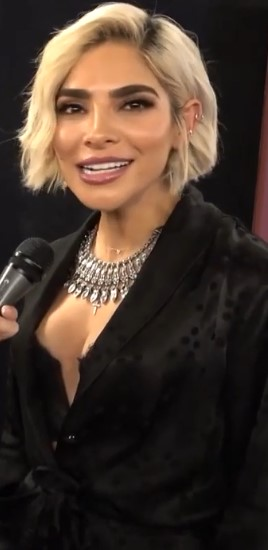
- Espinoza in 2020.
- Born: Alejandra Espinoza Cruz; March 27, 1987 (age 39); Tijuana, Baja California, Mexico
- Height: 1.73 m (5 ft 8 in)
- Spouse: Aníbal Marrero (m. 2011)
- Children: 1
- Beauty pageant titleholder
- Title: Nuestra Belleza Latina 2007
- Hair color: Brown
- Eye color: Brown
- Major competitions: Nuestra Belleza Mexico 2006 (3rd Runner-Up); Nuestra Belleza Latina 2007 (Winner)

Alejandra Marrero (née: Espinoza Cruz; born March 27, 1987) is a Mexican TV Host and Actress. She won the first year of Univision's beauty contest/reality television show Nuestra Belleza Latina on May 22, 2007.

== Pageants ==
Prior to participating in Nuestra Belleza Latina 2007, Espinoza competed in the Nuestra Belleza Mexico 2006 pageant, finishing as 3rd Runner-Up.

Espinoza competed against 11 other finalists on Nuestra Belleza Latina 2007. On the final show hosted by Giselle Blondet, she competed against five remaining finalists with a live performance by Cristian Castro.

== Career ==
In 2007, after winning a contract with the Univision network she joined the show El Gordo y la Flaca as a correspondent and guest co-host. In February 2008, Espinoza became a model and co-presenter on Univision's hit show Sabado Gigante starring Don Francisco. In July 2014, after 6 years of working at Sabado Gigante and appearing in 333 weekly shows, she left the show to pursue other projects in Los Angeles. In 2014, she served as co-host of Nuestra Belleza Latina 2014.

In July 2014, Univision announced that she will be the host of a new reality show and singing competition called La Banda scheduled for 2015. She is represented by MC2 Model Management in Miami.

In March 2025, it was announced that Univision personality Alejandra Espinoza would be joining the popular Los Angeles radio show "Buena Vibra" as a co-host. The show, broadcast on K-LOVE 107.5 FM, was simultaneously moved to the coveted morning drive time slot, airing from 5 a.m. to 10 a.m. PST, starting March 31, 2025. Espinoza joined established co-hosts Luis Sandoval and Erika Reyna.

Espinoza, a Tijuana native and former winner of Nuestra Belleza Latina, has an extensive background as a model, actress, and television presenter for TelevisaUnivision. The network noted that her "natural connection as a bicultural Hispanic mother" and her fresh personality are key assets expected to further connect the show with its audience. Espinoza herself commented that the move presented "the perfect opportunity to connect with the people in a meaningful way," emphasizing the personal connection fostered by radio.

== Personal life ==
Espinoza was born in Tijuana and comes from a family of ten children. Her mother's name is Rosa María and she emigrated with her family to San Ysidro, California in 2001. Espinoza worked at a fast food restaurant and participated in beauty pageants in her free time.

In 2011, Espinoza married her boyfriend Aníbal Marrero. In 2015, their first child, son Matteo, was born.

== Filmography ==
=== Film ===
Year	Title	Role	Notes
2017	Dos caminos	Miguelina	
2021	Perfecto anfitrión	Lorena	
2021	The Magic	Carolina Castillo	

=== Television ===
Year	Title	Role	Notes
2020	Rubí	Sonia Aristimuno	Main role
2022	Corazón guerrero	Mariluz García	Main role

=== Music videos ===
Year	Title	Artist(s)	Role
2014	"Fireball"	Pitbull feat. John Ryan	Woman

== Notes ==
Awards and achievements
Preceded by First Edition	Nuestra Belleza Latina; 2007	Succeeded by (Puerto Rico) Melissa Marty
