= Miss Puerto Rico Universe 2008 =

Competition held at the Centro de Bellas Artes in Santurce, San Juan, Puerto Rico

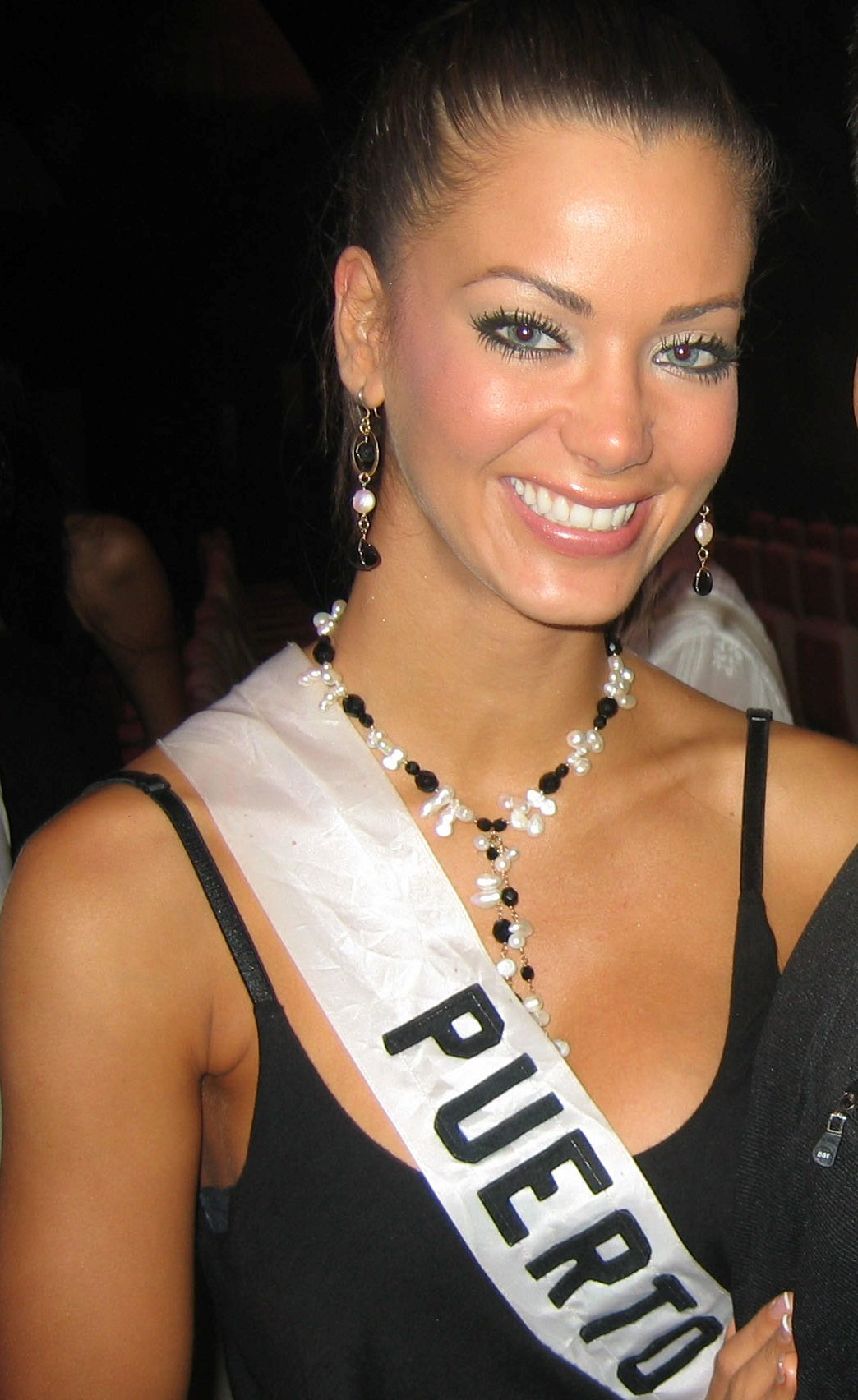
- Ingrid Marie Rivera, Miss Puerto Rico Universe 2008
- Date: November 23, 2007
- Presenters: Desiree Lowry, Osvaldo Ríos
- Entertainment: Kany García
- Venue: Centro de Bellas Artes, Santurce, San Juan
- Broadcaster: Telemundo
- Entrants: 30
- Placements: 13
- Winner: Ingrid Marie Rivera; Dorado

Miss Puerto Rico Universe 2008 was the 53rd Miss Puerto Rico Universe pageant, held at the Centro de Bellas Artes in Santurce, Puerto Rico, on November 23, 2007.

Uma Blasini of Guayanilla crowned Ingrid Marie Rivera of Dorado at the end of the event. Rivera represented Puerto Rico at the Miss Universe 2008 contest in Nha Trang, Vietnam, but did not reach the semifinals.

== Results ==
=== Placements ===
Placement	Contestant
Miss Puerto Rico Universe 2008	Dorado – Ingrid Marie Rivera
1st Runner-Up	Santurce – Claudia Alejandra Cruz
2nd Runner-Up	Trujillo Alto – Kristina Ruisánchez
3rd Runner-Up	Utuado – Maribel Montalvo
4th Runner-Up	Isabela – Amanda Díaz
5th Runner-Up	Bayamón – Ivelisse del Valle
Top 13	Caguas – Melissa Marty; Comerío - Cristina Torres; Guayama – María Noelis Rosario; Guaynabo – Francoise Mugnano Rosado; Ponce – Mónica Alvarado; San Sebastián – Cristina Mariel Larregui; Vega Alta – Elisa Acevedo

== Contestants ==
Thirty contestants competed for the title.

Municipality	Contestant
Aguadilla	Elisabeth Rivera
Arecibo	Delorean Torres
Barceloneta	Jedith Marie Crespo
Barranquitas	Celia Colón
Bayamón	Ivelisse del Valle
Caguas	Melissa Marty Caro
Canóvanas	Letty Pérez
Carolina	Yaritza Montalvo
Comerío	Cristina Paola Torres
Corozal	Sandybell de Jesús Agosto
Dorado	Ingrid Marie Rivera
Fajardo	Bianca Castro
Guayama	María Noelis Rosario
Guaynabo	Francoise Mugnano
Gurabo	Nicole Vega
Hatillo	Jennifer M. Sánchez
Isabela	Amanda Díaz
Juana Díaz	Vanessa Méndez
Lares	Luz Iraida Morales
Ponce	Mónica Alvarado
Salinas	Nathalie Cuevas
San Juan	Mayra Griselle Iglesias
San Sebastián	Cristina Mariel Larregui
Santurce	Claudia Alejandra Cruz
Trujillo Alto	Kristina Ruisánchez
United States	Lees Darian García
Utuado	Maribel Montalvo
Vega Alta	Elisa Acevedo
Villalba	Marjorie Crystal Castillo
Yauco	Dayline Caraballo

== Controversy ==
Conflict between the candidates and Pageant officials began when it was revealed that Ingrid Marie Rivera would be a candidate at this year's pageant. Prior to the Miss Puerto Rico Universe competition, Rivera had participated in several major beauty pageants. In 2005 she won the title of Miss Mundo de Puerto Rico (Miss Puerto Rico World) following her win she competed at the Miss World pageant placing 2nd runner-up and obtained the title of Miss Caribbean World. In 2003, she also held the title of Miss Global Queen. Rivera was also a judge at last year's Miss Puerto Rico Universe pageant won by Uma Blasini. Candidates were concerned about Rivera, they felt as if she should not be allowed to compete and feared that Rivera's previous pageant experience would favor her in the competition and help her win the pageant.

=== Pageant night ===
Rivera was booed by some members of the crowd in her swimsuit, evening gown and final question competitions. Despite it all Rivera won the title, although her victory is portrayed as an unfair win. Three days after the pageant was over an even bigger controversy arouse when it was revealed Rivera's belongings had been stolen while the competition was undergoing. Also Rivera's gown and makeup had been coated with pepper spray, causing redness and itchiness in her skin during the pageant. This incident has made headlines and is now being investigated by officers to determine who is responsible for this.

== Evidence ==
At first police said tests showed no traces of capsicum, the pepper spray's active ingredient, disproving the alleged sabotage of Rivera's clothing during the competition. Police are now investigating and questioning if the alleged sabotage against Rivera is a true story or a publicity stunt. Rivera, pageant officials, and even Magali Febles who is the owner of the Miss Puerto Rico Universe organization could possibly be submitted to a lie detector test. The investigation continued for the next couple of weeks. None of the participants have publicly admitted seeing Rivera with any type of reaction during the competition nor seeing anyone with a suspicious behavior that could lead to a suspect. The delegates from the towns of Santurce, Guaynabo, Bayamón, Salinas, Fajardo and Utuado appeared on American television, on shows like "The Tyra Banks Show" and "The Today Show" , saying they were skeptical about the veracity of this incident since none of them knew anything about it until days after the pageant was over. After a few weeks during the investigation, a swimsuit and a second gown were tested, and pepper spray was found.
