= Miss Universe Puerto Rico 2024 =

68th Miss Universe Puerto Rico

- Date: June 27, 2024
- Presenters: José Santana; Diane Ferrer
- Entertainment: Luis Enrique; Silvestre Dangond
- Venue: Luis A. Ferré Performing Arts Center, Santurce, San Juan, Puerto Rico
- Broadcaster: WAPA-TV
- Entrants: 28
- Placements: 15
- Winner: Jennifer Colón; Orocovis
- Personality: Angelisse Lucena; Añasco
- Photogenic: Stephanie Ríos; Toa Alta

Miss Universe Puerto Rico 2024 was the 68th Miss Universe Puerto Rico pageant, held at the Luis A. Ferré Performing Arts Center in San Juan, Puerto Rico, on June 27, 2024.

Karla Guilfú Acevedo of Patillas crowned Jennifer Colón Alvarado of Orocovis as her successor at the end of the event. Colón represented Puerto Rico at the Miss Universe 2024 pageant held in Mexico, where she placed in the Top 12.

== Results ==
=== Placements ===
Color keys

- The contestant was a winner in an International pageant.
- The contestant was a finalist in an International pageant.
- The contestant was a semi-finalist in an International pageant.

Placement	Contestant	International placement
Winner (Miss Universe Puerto Rico 2024)	Orocovis – Jennifer Colón	Top 12 – Miss Universe 2024
1st Runner-Up	Corozal – Orlanis Rivera	
2nd Runner-Up (Miss Charm Puerto Rico 2024)	Salinas – Carolina Gómez	Top 20 – Miss Charm 2024
3rd Runner-Up (Universal Woman Puerto Rico 2025)	Lares – Ivana Carolina Irizarry	Winner – Universal Woman 2025
4th Runner-Up	Toa Alta – Stephanie Ríos	
Top 10	Ciales – Karen Caraballo; Fajardo – Giuliana Cusnier; Juana Díaz – Winedly Lugo Lind; Toa Baja – Aracelis Moreno; Vega Alta – Reina Ríos	
Top 15	Arecibo – Raizha Enid Cruz; Camuy – D’Loruama Robles; Cayey – Karina von Gundlach; Dorado – Lexiomi Mercado; Guaynabo – Jerusha Claudio Ford	

=== Special awards ===
Award	Winner	Ref.
Miss Photogenic	Toa Alta – Stephanie Ríos	
Miss Personality	Añasco – Angelisse Lucena	
Total Look	San Juan – Kellyan Soto	
L´Oréal Most Beautiful Hair	Salinas – Carolina Gómez	
L´Oréal Most Radiant Skin	Orocovis – Jennifer Colón	
L´Oréal Mujer De Valor	Lares – Ivana Irizarry	
My Way Award	Corozal – Orlanis Rivera	
Colgate Impactful Smile	Salinas – Carolina Gómez	

== Contestants ==
Twenty-eight contestants will compete for the title of Miss Universe Puerto Rico 2024:

Municipality	Contestant	Age
Aguadilla	Claribel Rosa Bocanegra	46
Añasco	Angelisse Marie Lucena Nazario	31
Arecibo	Raizha Enid Cruz Figueroa	31
Arroyo	Génesis María Dávila Pérez	33
Bayamón	Myrtis Sahara Álvarez Villalobos	27
Caguas	Camila Beatrice Ramírez Osorio	24
Camuy	D’Loruama Robles Delgado	27
Canóvanas	Evimary Piñero Colón	28
Carolina	Cinthia de la Cruz	38
Cayey	Karina Sarieh von Gundlach Pomales	26
Ciales	Karen Cristina Caraballo Figueroa	29
Comerío	Carla María Camacho Ramírez	19
Corozal	Orlanis Naomi Rivera	24
Dorado	Lexiomi Mercado Fuentes	27
Fajardo	Giuliana Andrea Cusnier Palermo	22
Guaynabo	Jerusha Miren Claudio Ford	27
Hatillo	Keliann Krystal Jiménez	30
Isabela	Kamila Krystal Vera de Jesús	22
Juana Díaz	Winedly Marie Lugo Lind	37
Lares	Ivana Carolina Irizarry Fritany	30
Manatí	Joan Marie Falcon	34
Naranjito	Lyanne Marie Morales	32
Orocovis	Jennifer Colón Alvarado	36
Salinas	Carolina Mía Gómez Cumba	27
San Juan	Kellyan Soto	26
Toa Alta	Stephanie Ríos Vélez	31
Toa Baja	Aracelis Moreno Santana	30
Vega Alta	Reina de los Ángeles Ríos	24

== Judges ==
The following individuals were selected as judges:

=== Preliminary ===
- Saudy Rivera – Television presenter
- Marta Siverio – Businesswoman
- Keyla La Santa – Social worker
- Hermes Croatto – Singer
- Ronlys Zacarías – Influencer
- Rodríguez Terry – Plastic surgeon
- Wesley Pérez – Businessman

=== Final ===
- Saudy Rivera – Television presenter
- Marta Siverio – Businesswoman
- Rodríguez Terry – Plastic surgeon
- Harry Robles – Fashion designer
- Modesto Lacén – Actor
- Madison Anderson – Miss Universe Puerto Rico 2019 from Toa Baja
- Ashley Cariño – Miss Universe Puerto Rico 2022 from Fajardo

Preceded by {{{before}}}	Miss Universe Puerto Rico; 2024	Succeeded by
