= Danna Hernández =

Miss Universe Puerto Rico 2017

- Born: Danyeshka Hernández Valentín; 16 October 1996 (age 29); San Juan, Puerto Rico
- Height: 1.73 m (5 ft 8 in)
- Beauty pageant titleholder
- Title: Miss Teen Americas Puerto Rico 2013; Miss San Juan Universe 2017; Miss Universe Puerto Rico 2017
- Hair color: Brown
- Eye color: Brown
- Major competitions: Miss Teen Americas Puerto Rico 2013 (Winner); Miss Teen Américas 2013 (Top 7) (Best Body); Miss Universe Puerto Rico 2017 (Winner); Miss Universe 2017 (Unplaced)

Danyeshka "Danna" Hernández Valentín (born 16 October 1996) is a Puerto Rican model and beauty pageant titleholder who was crowned Miss Universe Puerto Rico 2017 on May 4, 2017, and represented Puerto Rico at the Miss Universe 2017 pageant.

== Personal life ==
Hernández was born in San Juan, Puerto Rico. She is a model and also studies in the Department of Communications, Public Relations and Marketing at the University of Puerto Rico.

== Beauty pageants ==
=== Miss Teen Americas Puerto Rico 2013 ===
Hernández was crowned Miss Teen Americas Puerto Rico 2013 in El Salvador.

=== Miss Universe Puerto Rico 2017 ===
On May 4, 2017, representing the capital city of San Juan, Hernández was crowned Miss Universe Puerto Rico 2017, succeeding Miss Universe Puerto Rico 2016 Brenda Jiménez. Hernandez represented Puerto Rico at the Miss Universe 2017 pageant but failed to place in the semifinals. This marked the first time since 1991 that Puerto Rico failed to place more than 3 years in a row.

Awards and achievements
Preceded by Brenda Jiménez (Aguadilla)	Miss Puerto Rico Universe; 2017	Succeeded by Kiara Ortega (Rincón)
Preceded by Heilymar Rosario	Miss San Juan Universe; 2017	Succeeded by Nashley Pariente
