= Karla Guilfú =

Puerto Rican model

- Guilfú in 2025
- Born: Karla Inelisse Guilfú Acevedo; July 19, 1998 (age 28); Patillas, Puerto Rico
- Education: Ana G. Méndez University, Gurabo (BS)
- Occupation: Model
- Height: 1.79 m (5 ft 10 in)
- Beauty pageant titleholder
- Title: Miss Supranational Puerto Rico 2021; Miss Universe Puerto Rico 2023
- Hair color: Black
- Eye color: Brown
- Major competitions: Miss Supranational Puerto Rico 2021; (Winner); Miss Supranational 2021; (1st Runner-Up); Miss Universe Puerto Rico 2023; (Winner); Miss Universe 2023; (Top 5)

Karla Inelisse Guilfú Acevedo (born July 19, 1998) is a Puerto Rican model and beauty pageant titleholder. She was crowned Miss Universe Puerto Rico 2023 and represented Puerto Rico at Miss Universe 2023, where she reached the top five. Guilfú was previously crowned Miss Supranational Puerto Rico 2021, and represented Puerto Rico at the Miss Supranational 2021 pageant in Poland, where she finished as the first runner-up.

== Pageantry ==
=== Miss Supranational ===
In 2021, Karla Guilfú represented Puerto Rico at the Miss Supranational pageant, where she finished as the 1st runner-up. This achievement marked Puerto Rico's second-best result at Miss Supranational since Valeria Vázquez won the title in 2018.

=== Miss Universe ===
Following her success in Miss Supranational, Guilfú continued her journey in pageantry by winning the Miss Universe Puerto Rico 2023 pageant, representing the municipality of Patillas. Her victory granted her the opportunity to represent Puerto Rico at the Miss Universe pageant. Guilfú's performance at Miss Universe 2023 was highly anticipated, and she lived up to expectations by finishing as a Top 5 finalist. This achievement placed her among a select group of Puerto Rican women who have consistently placed in the semifinals of Miss Universe, starting from the country's streak in 2018.

Awards and achievements
Preceded by (Curaçao) Gabriëla Dos Santos (Puerto Rico) Ashley Cariño (Top 5)	Miss Universe Top 5 Finalist (with (Colombia) Camila Avella); 2023	Succeeded by (Thailand) Suchata Chuangsri (3rd Runner-Up) (Venezuela) Ileana Márquez (4th Runner-Up)
Preceded by Ashley Cariño	Miss Universe Puerto Rico; 2023	Succeeded by Jennifer Colón
Preceded by Charlene Ortiz	Miss Patillas Universe; 2023	Incumbent
Preceded by (Namibia) Yana Haenisch	Miss Supranational; 1st Runner-Up; 2021	Succeeded by (Thailand) Praewwanich Ruangthong
Preceded by Shaleyka Vélez	Miss Supranational Puerto Rico; 2021	Succeeded by Ariette Banchs
