= Ingrid Marie Rivera =

Puerto Rican actor, model, and beauty pageant winner

Íngrid Marie Rivera
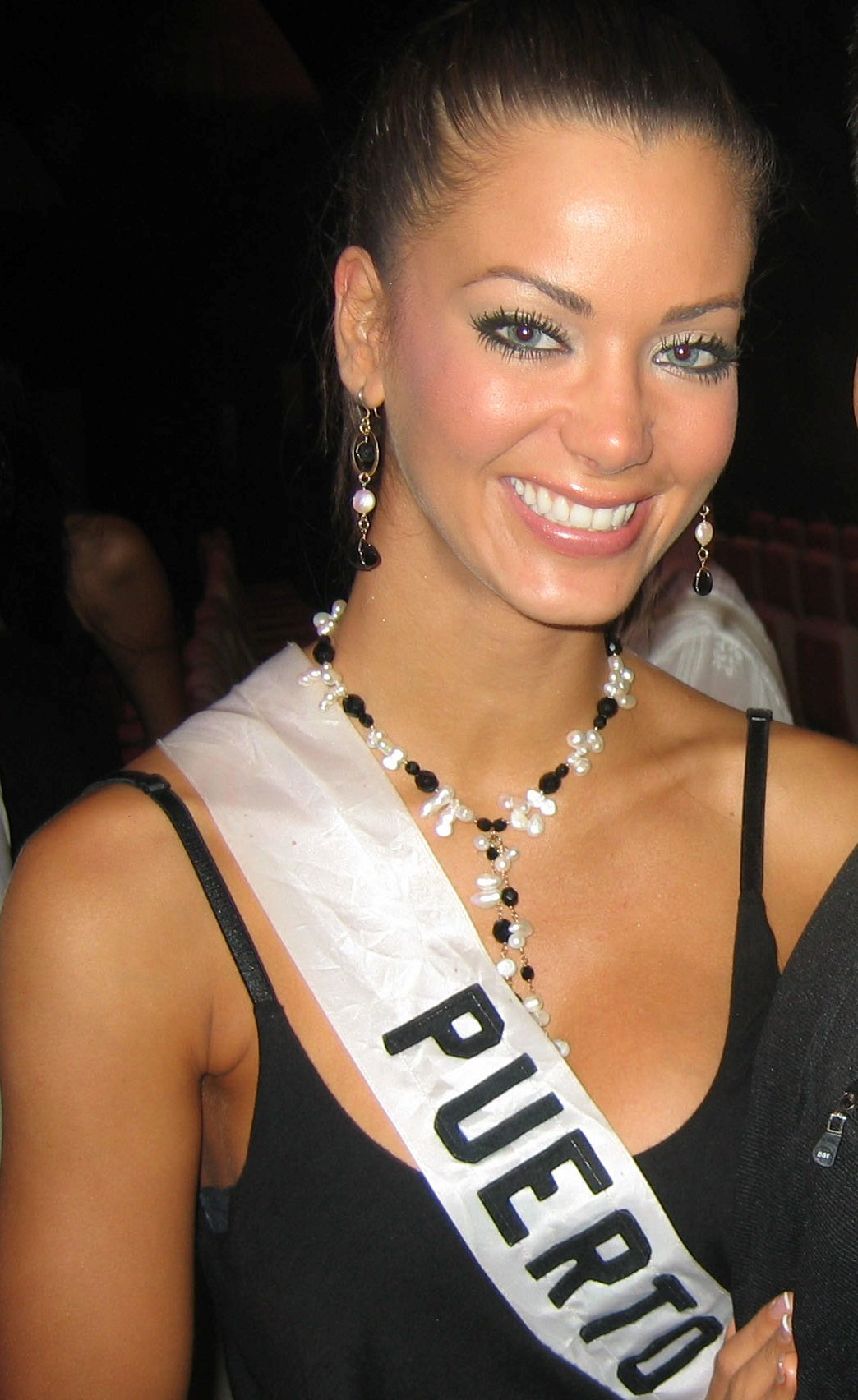
- Rivera in 2008
- Born: Ingrid Marie Rivera Santos; October 8, 1983 (age 43); Luquillo, Puerto Rico, U.S.
- Height: 5 ft 9 in (1.75 m)
- Beauty pageant titleholder
- Title: Miss Mundo de Puerto Rico 2005; Miss World Caribbean 2005; Miss Puerto Rico Universe 2008
- Hair color: Brown
- Eye color: Blue
- Major competitions: Miss Mundo de Puerto Rico 2005 (Winner); Miss World 2005 (2nd runner-up) (Miss World Caribbean); Miss Puerto Rico Universe 2008 (Winner); Miss Universe 2008 (Unplaced)

Íngrid Marie Rivera Santos (born October 8, 1983, in Luquillo) is a Puerto Rican actress, model and beauty pageant titleholder who was crowned Miss Mundo de Puerto Rico 2005 and represented her country at Miss World 2005. She later won Miss Puerto Rico Universe 2008 and represented her country at Miss Universe 2008.

== Participation in beauty pageants ==
Rivera has participated in several beauty pageants. In 2003, she won Miss Global Queen.

=== Miss Mundo de Puerto Rico 2005 ===
Rivera competed in and won Miss Mundo de Puerto Rico 2005 giving her the right to represent Puerto Rico at Miss World.

=== Miss World 2005 ===
Ingrid represented Puerto Rico at Miss World 2005 where she eventually placed second runner-up. She also won the title of Miss World Caribbean.

=== Miss Puerto Rico Universe 2008 ===
On November 23, 2007, Rivera represented Dorado at Miss Puerto Rico Universe 2008. Rivera advanced to the five semifinalist phase, along participants representing Isabela, Utuado, Trujillo Alto and Santurce. As part of a "final question" segment she was asked "With what social labor do you identify yourself and why?" to which she responded that she supported women that are victims of domestic abuse. Rivera advanced to the final two semifinalist spots along Santurce, and was selected the contest winner by a jury. Rivera and Puerto Rico's delegation were offered $25,000 in economic support for their preparation prior to Miss Universe 2008. In this pageant Rivera would wear dresses created by numerous designers including Carlos Alberto, René Cruz, Nathalia López, Chegüi Lacén, José Raúl, Antonio Da Silva, José Braulio, José Karlo, Ivanyo, Verona, Casanova, Machito, Pipo Pere, Adam Hernández, Valentino Zeliachi and Ángel Guzmán, with most of the pieces exhibiting brilliant colors representative of the tropical climate found in the Caribbean.

==== Pepper spray incident ====
On November 25, 2007, two days after winning the 2008 Miss Puerto Rico Universe pageant, Rivera asserted that her competition gown and her makeup had caused a strange reaction on her skin. On November 30, 2007, the island's Forensic Science Institute announced that no traces of pepper spray had been found on the garment or her makeup brushes, which had been submitted for testing by pageant organizers. However, FSI spokesperson Abigail Marrero did point out that the test was not conclusive. Nevertheless, during an on-air interview of the incident at San Juan's Channel 4 WAPA-TV, Police Superintendent Pedro Toledo stated that he would look into what he called false accusations as well as the possibility of pressing perjury charges. He said he would not tolerate the use of public resources for publicity purposes.

A subsequent investigation by the FSI conclusively determined that someone had indeed doused Rivera's garments with pepper spray. Lt. Eddie Hernández, a Puerto Rico Police spokesman, stated on December 19, 2007, that "Miss Puerto Rico Universe was speaking the truth. She was being sincere about the allegations." Evidence has been forwarded to the district attorney's office for possible criminal prosecution.

=== Miss Universe 2008 ===
On July 8, 2008, Rivera participated in Miss Universe's preliminary pageant, in the swimsuit and gala competitions, where she wore a dress composed of several golden metal rings. This stage also included an interview with the jury. Following the conclusion the preliminary stage, Rivera's parents joined her in Vietnam. Despite being considered a big favorite Rivera did not advance to the semifinals, which caused surprise among the local media as well as her family. Subsequently, she expressed satisfaction with her performance but also expressed disbelief for her elimination in the final stages of competition. Rivera returned to Puerto Rico on July 26, 2008. She subsequently noted that several work proposals had been presented to her, which were under consideration. Rivera was scheduled to attend Televisa auditions in November 2008, and was to move to either the United States or Mexico depending on the result.

== Beauty titles ==
- Miss Barranquitas World 2002 (designated)
- Miss Puerto Rico Hawaiian Tropic 2002 (designated)
- Miss Puerto Rico Global Queen 2003 (designated)
- Miss Global Queen 2003
- Miss Dorado World 2005 (designated)
- Miss World Puerto Rico 2005
- Miss World Caribbean 2005
- Miss Dorado Universe 2008 (designated)
- Miss Puerto Rico 2008

== Personal life ==
Ingrid was born October 8, 1983, in Luquillo, Puerto Rico to Elba Santos and John Rivera. She currently lives in Mexico City, where she began a career as an actress in soap operas.

Awards and achievements
Preceded by Uma Blasini (Guayanilla)	Miss Puerto Rico Universe; 2008	Succeeded by Mayra Matos (Cabo Rojo)
Preceded by (United States) Nancy Randall	Miss World 2nd Runner-Up; 2005	Succeeded by (Australia) Sabrina Houssami
Preceded by (Dominican Republic) Claudia Cruz	Miss World Caribbean; 2005	Succeeded by (Jamaica) Sara Lawrence
Preceded by Cassandra Castro (Luquillo)	Miss Mundo de Puerto Rico; 2005	Succeeded by Thebyam Carrión Álvarez (Arecibo)
