= Mayra Matos =

Puerto Rican model and beauty pageant titleholder

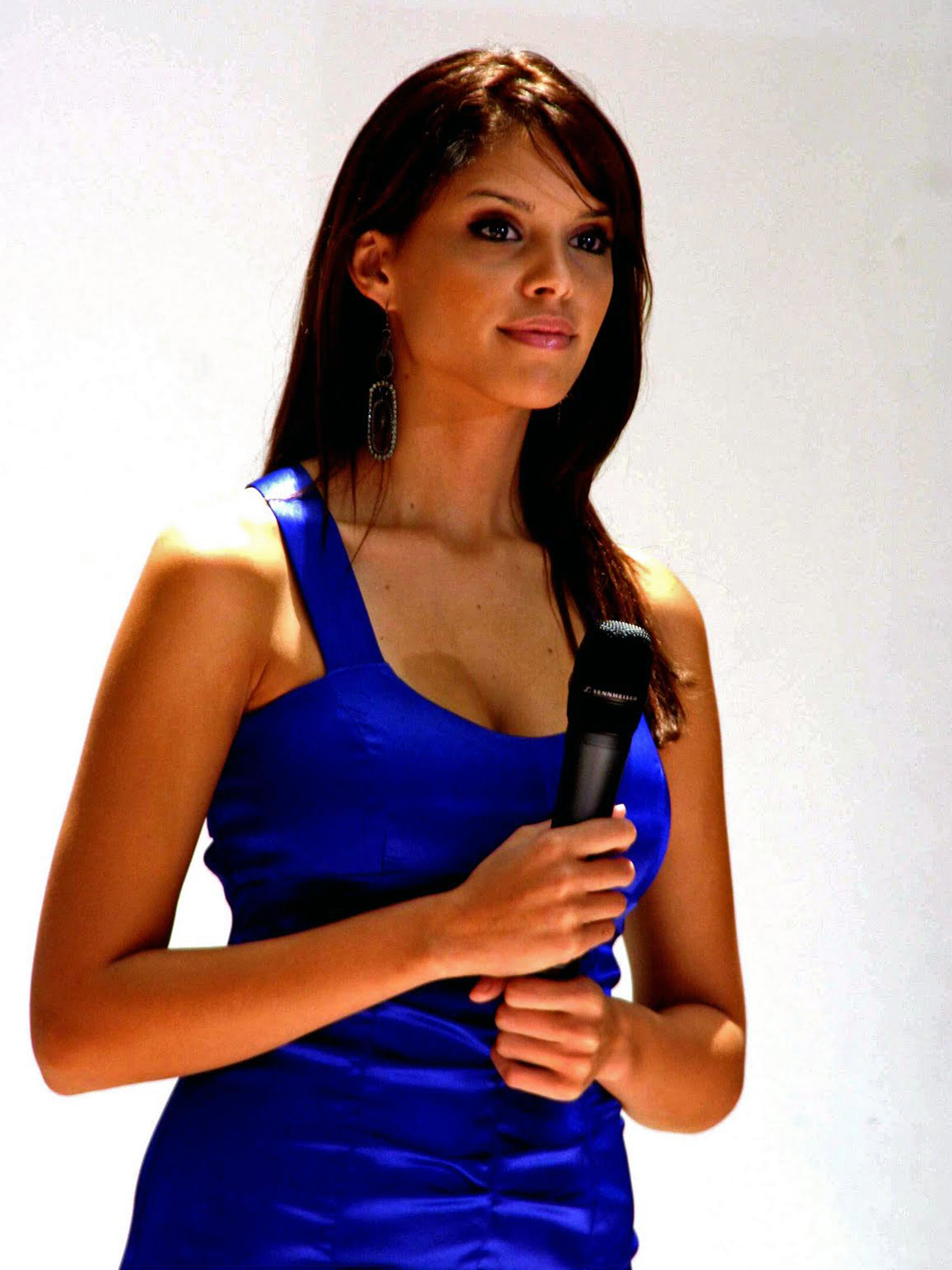
- Matos in 2010
- Born: Mayra Matos Pérez; August 28, 1988 (age 38); San Juan, Puerto Rico
- Height: 5 ft 10 in (1.78 m)
- Beauty pageant titleholder
- Title: Miss Puerto Rico Teenage 2005; Miss Teen International 2006; Miss Cabo Rojo Universe 2009; Miss Puerto Rico Universe 2009
- Hair color: Brown
- Eye color: Brown
- Major competitions: Miss Teen International 2006; (Winner); Miss Puerto Rico Universe 2009; (Winner); Miss Universe 2009; (4th Runner-Up); Nuestra Belleza Latina 2015; (Top 20)

Mayra Matos Pérez (born August 28, 1988 in San Juan) is a Puerto Rican actress, writer, fashion model and beauty pageant titleholder who held the title of Miss Teen International 2006 and Miss Puerto Rico Universe 2009.

== Miss Puerto Rico Universe 2009 ==
Matos represented Cabo Rojo at the Miss Puerto Rico Universe 2009 pageant where she was crowned Miss Puerto Rico Universe by outgoing titleholder Ingrid Rivera with the assistance of Miss USA 2008 Crystle Stewart and Miss Dominican Republic 2008 Marianne Cruz. She also won the award for "Most Beautiful Face".

== Miss Universe ==
=== Preliminary rounds ===
Matos wore a costume modeled after boxing gear during the national costume competition; the piece included a hooded robe, gloves and a championship belt bearing the Coat of arms of Puerto Rico. The outfit was known to the island's boxing tradition, which has produced more champions per capita than any other location in the world.

=== Final show ===
Matos represented Puerto Rico at Miss Universe 2009 on August 23, 2009, in Nassau, Bahamas. She was the first of the semifinalists to be called, breaking a two-year non-placement streak for Puerto Rico. She then advanced to the Top 10 and was one of the Top 5 finalists, along with Ada de la Cruz of the Dominican Republic, Rachel Finch of Australia, Stefanía Fernandez of Venezuela, and Marigona Dragusha of Kosovo. She eventually finished as 4th Runner-Up. The eventual winner was Stefanía Fernandez of Venezuela This was Puerto Rico's most recent Top 5 placement until 2018 when Kiara Ortega also finished in the Top 5.

== Professional life ==
In 2013 Matos appeared in the comedy film 200 Cartas, a film about a comic book artist who travels to Puerto Rico to find a woman he met at a bar in New York City. Matos appears as Maria Sanchez, the love interest of Lin-Manuel Miranda's character Raul. The film also stars Mexican actor Jaime Camil, Puerto Rican actor and comedian Luis Raúl, and Miss Universe 1993 Dayanara Torres.

Awards and achievements
| Preceded by (Mexico) Elisa Nájera | Miss Universe 4th Runner-Up; 2009 | Succeeded by (Philippines) Venus Raj |
| Preceded by Ingrid Rivera (Dorado) | Miss Puerto Rico Universe; 2009 | Succeeded by Mariana Vicente (Río Grande) |
| Preceded by Jeimimar Ramos | Miss Cabo Rojo Universe; 2009 | Succeeded by Carolina Rodríguez |
| Preceded by (Australia) Lauryn Eagle | Miss Teen International; 2006 | Succeeded by (Mexico) Jenny Quiroga |
