= Ivonne Orsini =

Puerto Rican model

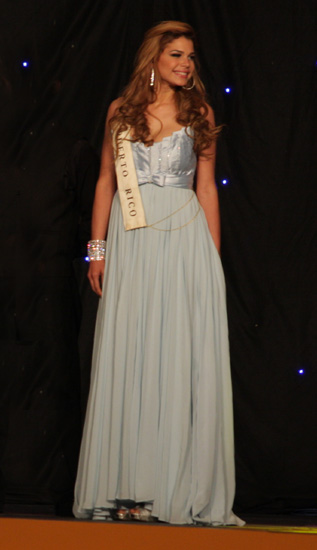
- Born: Ivonne Marie Orsini López; April 6, 1988 (age 38); Bayamón, Puerto Rico
- Beauty pageant titleholder
- Title: Miss World Puerto Rico 2008
- Hair color: Dark Blonde
- Eye color: Brown
- Major competitions: Miss World Puerto Rico 2008 (Winner); Miss World 2008; (Top 15)

Ivonne Marie Orsini López (born April 6, 1988, at Bayamón) is a Puerto Rican actress, model, tv host and beauty pageant titleholder. Her career began in the pageantry industry, but she has moved into other media. Orsini was one of the hosts of WAPA-TV show ¡Viva la tarde!. Currently, she is now the co-host of the Puerto Rican version of Hoy Día on Telemundo station WKAQ-TV.

== Pageantry ==
=== Miss World Puerto Rico 2008 ===
Orsini competed in Miss World Puerto Rico 2008, representing San Juan municipality, where she won.

== TV roles ==
Her first major TV appearance was the Spanish reality show Supervivientes. She moved permanently to Spain in 2009. In 2011 she was selected as the official face for the first Latinamerican TV Channel in the European region. In 2014, she joined the TV program: "Viva La Tarde" as co-host on WAPA-TV in Puerto Rico. In 2021, she became co-host of the Puerto Rican edition of Telemundo's Hoy Día on WKAQ-TV. (2023) now day’s she’s one of the three host of the TV show “Hoy Día Puerto Rico” also is the celebrity host of the fashion TV show “Revelación Moda” of Tele Mundo.

== See also ==
- List of Puerto Ricans
- History of women in Puerto Rico

Awards and achievements
Preceded by Jennifer Guevara (Orocovis)	Miss World Puerto Rico; 2008	Succeeded by Jennifer Colón (Bayamón)
