= Miss Universe Puerto Rico 2021 =

Beauty pageant edition

- Date: September 30, 2021
- Presenters: Jose Figueroa; Estefanía Soto
- Entertainment: Lunay; Fonseca; Manuel Medrano
- Venue: Luis A. Ferré Performing Arts Center, San Juan, Puerto Rico
- Broadcaster: WAPA-TV
- Entrants: 26
- Placements: 15
- Withdrawals: Arecibo; Caguas; Camuy; Canóvanas; Corozal; Culebra; Gurabo; Hatillo; Lares; Morovis; Peñuelas; San Sebastián
- Returns: Cidra; Fajardo; Isabela; Juana Diaz; Luquillo; Mayagüez; Ponce; Rio Grande; San German; San Lorenzo; Yauco
- Winner: Michelle Marie Colón; Loíza
- Congeniality: Karina von Gundlach; Cayey
- Photogenic: Marangelí Meléndez; Cidra

Miss Universe Puerto Rico 2021 was the 65th of Miss Universe Puerto Rico pageant, held at the Luis A. Ferré Performing Arts Center in San Juan, Puerto Rico, on September 30, 2021.

Estefanía Soto of San Sebastián crowned Michelle Colón of Loíza as her successor at the end of the event. Colón represented Puerto Rico at the Miss Universe 2021 pageant and finished as Top 10.

== Pageant ==
=== Judges ===
==== Preliminary ====
- Uma Blasini – Miss Puerto Rico Universe 2007 from Guayanilla
- Danna Hernández – Miss Universe Puerto Rico 2017 from San Juan
- Katiria Soto – Journalist
- Yamil Ureña – Actor
- Paul Anthony – Hair and makeup artist
- Margarita Álvarez – Fashion designer
- Otilio Santiago – Businessman
- Maximiliano Córdova – Model and banker
- Eileen Ojeda – Walgreens director of operations

==== Final ====
- Aleyda Ortiz – Nuestra Belleza Latina 2014
- Ana Rosa Brito – Miss Universe Puerto Rico 1997 from San Juan
- Anna di Marco – Doctor
- Frances Estrada – Fashion blogger and influencer
- Joyce Giraud – Miss Universe Puerto Rico 1998 from Aguas Buenas
- Juan Casillas – B Media Group president
- Madison Anderson – Miss Universe Puerto Rico 2019 from Toa Baja
- Michelle Pérez – Vicepresident of El Vocero
- Viviana Ortiz – Miss Universe Puerto Rico 2011 from Corozal

== Results ==
=== Placements ===
Placement	Contestant
Miss Universe Puerto Rico 2021	Loíza – Michelle Colón
1st Runner-Up	San Lorenzo – Jaylene Álvarez
2nd Runner-Up	Dorado – Oxana Rivera
Top 6	Toa Baja – Heilymar Rosario; Trujillo Alto – Sthephanie Miranda; Villalba – Gabriela Guzmán §
Top 10	Aguada – Liana Teresa Morales; Isabela – Gabriela Sofía Muñoz; Salinas – Astrid Dianet Arroyo; San Juan – Fabiola Marie Aquino
Top 15	Carolina – Ediris Joan Rivera; Cidra – Marangelí Meléndez; Mayagüez – Amanda Ayala; Toa Alta – Zaely Coral Sierra; Vega Baja – Génesis Oliver Santiago

§ – Voted into the Top 6 by viewers

=== Special awards ===
Award	Winner
Miss Photogenic	Cidra – Marangelí Meléndez
Miss Friendship	Cayey – Karina von Gundlach
Most Beautiful Skin	Isabela – Gabriela Muñoz Lugo
Most Beautiful Hair	Trujillo Alto – Sthephanie Miranda

== Contestants ==
Twenty-six contestants competed for the title.

Municipality	Contestant	Age	Notes
Aguada	Andrea Carolina Delgado	22	
Aguadilla	Liana Teresa Morales Sizemore	24	
Añasco	Johalmi De Jesús Queliz	26	
Bayamón	Natalia Alexa Aldarondo	24	
Carolina	Ediris Joan Rivera	25	
Cidra	Marangelí Meléndez	24	
Dorado	Oxana Isabel Rivera Álvarez	27	
Fajardo	Janice Jimenez	22	
Guaynabo	Dalymar Villanueva	23	
Isabela	Gabriela Sofía Muñoz Lugo	25	
Juana Díaz	Leirian Cosme	27	
Loíza	Michelle Marie Colón Ramírez	21	
Luquillo	Jehanna López	27	
Mayagüez	Amanda Ayala	27	
Ponce	Lisamar Soe Olivera	18	
Río Grande	Nathàlie Santa Cruz Bacardí	25	
Salinas	Astrid Dianet Arroyo Díaz	26	
San Germán	Bárbara Betancourt	27	Later first runner-up at Miss World Puerto Rico 2021
San Juan	Fabiola Marie Aquino Barreto	25	
San Lorenzo	Jaylene Marie Álvarez	28	
Toa Alta	Zaely Coral Sierra	23	
Toa Baja	Heilymar Rosario Velazquez	25	
Trujillo Alto	Sthephanie Marie Miranda Morales	27	Previously Miss Ohio USA 2020 (Top 16 at Miss USA 2020)
Vega Baja	Génesis Oliver Santiago	23	
Villalba	Gabriela Guzmán	22	
Yauco	Andrea Esperanza Cruz Álvares	21	

== See also ==
- Miss Universe Puerto Rico

Preceded by {{{before}}}	Miss Universe Puerto Rico; 2021	Succeeded by 2022
