= Dominican Republic immigration to Puerto Rico =

Immigrants have moved from the Dominican Republic to its eastern neighbor

Dominicans in Puerto Rico
Total population
- 68,036; 1.8% of Puerto Rico's population (2010)

Regions with significant populations
- San Juan; Carolina; Bayamón

Languages
- Dominican Spanish; Puerto Rican Spanish; English language in Puerto Rico

Religion
- Christianity, predominantly Catholic; Dominican Vudú

Dominican immigration to Puerto Rico dates back to the beginning of European colonization of the Americas. Immigrants have moved from the territory of the Dominican Republic to its eastern neighbor, Puerto Rico, for centuries. Dominican immigrants have come from various segments of Dominican society, with varying levels of contribution at different times.

In recent years, the rate of Dominican immigration has declined due to the unemployment and economic crisis in Puerto Rico, and there's been increasing immigration in the opposite direction, from Puerto Rico to the Dominican Republic, consisting of both Dominicans returning from Puerto Rico as well as ethnic Puerto Ricans settling in the Dominican Republic. Haitian nationals now make the majority of persons trying to reach the U.S. commonwealth from the island of Hispaniola, usually with the aid of Dominican smugglers.

== 1795 to 1961 ==
Many residents of Colonial Santo Domingo, now the Dominican Republic, left for Puerto Rico because of the cession of Santo Domingo to France in 1795, the Haitian invasions from 1801 to 1803, and the occupation from 1822 to 1844. Immigration continued over the next 86 years although at a comparatively low rate.

The dictatorship of Rafael Trujillo from 1930 to 1961 greatly constrained foreign travel by Dominicans. In 1960, there were 1,812 Dominicans in Puerto Rico, some of whom were "returning" descendants of Puerto Ricans who had themselves migrated to the Dominican Republic.

Historically, there has been very high migration between Puerto Rico and the Dominican Republic, not only during the Taino era, but also during the Spanish colonial era up until modern times. It was very, very common, due to similar cultures, for newcomers to intermarry and assimilate easily into the local culture. It is estimated that significant portions of both islands have some distant ancestry from the other island due to the constant flow between both islands especially in the 18th to mid 20th centuries.

== Recently ==
Dominican migration increased sharply after 1961 as a result of political events, of which the first was the assassination of Trujillo that year. Many politicians and other members of the conservative former regime, as well as government employees, left the country, many of them for Puerto Rico. The next major political event to drive emigration was the coup d'état against the elected, leftist president Juan Bosch in 1963. Then followed the Dominican Civil War in 1965 after a revolt to restore Bosch. The United States invaded the Dominican Republic a few days into the conflict, and one of its policies was to prevent renewed civil war by issuing visas to opponents or potential opponents of the newly elected US-backed conservative regime of Joaquín Balaguer (who was incidentally, like Bosch, of Puerto Rican ancestry). Many of the visa holders traveled to Puerto Rico.

Politics continued to play a role in emigration in succeeding decades, as presidential election years produced emigration peaks whenever Balaguer, a member of the former Trujillo regime, won the presidency, as happened in 1966, 1970, 1974, 1986, and 1990. As a result, most of the Dominican emigration was middle-class and skilled, including many managers and professionals.

Although there are substantial upper class and middle class segments in the Dominican Republic, the country also has a high poverty rate. Since the 1970s, the poor economy of the Dominican Republic has rampantly driven emigration. Overall, between 1966 and 2002 119,000 Dominicans were legally admitted to Puerto Rico, while many thousands arrived illegally. Most emigrants, however, are far from destitute, as they tend to be jobholders in the Dominican Republic, many in skilled occupations such as mechanic, mason, seamstress, and nurse. Such migrants have been attracted by the economy of Puerto Rico's higher wages, which have generally tended to rise in relation to Dominican wages since the early 1980s, when an era of frequent devaluation of the Dominican peso began. Economic crises that beset the Dominican Republic in the 1980s further increased emigration. Despite strong economic growth, the 1990s marked the peak in Dominican emigration because of the high income inequality. Another severe economic crisis hit in 2003 to 2004, again causing a surge in emigration.

The height of modern-day Dominican immigration to Puerto Rico was from 1970 to about 2005, when the Puerto Rican economy started to decline, since then it's been slowly dying down, with increasing immigration the opposite direction, Puerto Ricans moving to the Dominican Republic. Though, many Dominicans who moved to Puerto Rico, stayed and started a life there, some Dominicans (and even other Latinos/Caribbeans like Haitians and Cubans) used it as a temporary stop-over point to the US mainland, particularly to cities like New York and Miami. Although, 2010 census estimates put the number of Dominicans living in Puerto Rico at 68,000, there are estimates that put the number as high as 300,000, with many undocumented. Some Dominican criminals take advantage of Puerto Rico's territory status, by doing crimes such as Identity theft of Puerto Rican US citizens, and drug distribution working with Puerto Rican criminals to ship Colombian drugs to the island and then further be shipped to the US mainland. However, the vast majority of Dominicans come for a better life, to start a business, and live a positive lifestyle.

== Illegal immigration ==
The illegal or undocumented component of the Dominican immigration to Puerto Rico has increased over recent decades, becoming large enough to attract great attention, both in Puerto Rico and the Dominican Republic. The first recorded illegal trip took place in 1972, and perhaps 28% of all Dominicans in Puerto Rico were undocumented in 1996, during the peak decade of Dominican immigration to the Commonwealth; many of the documented residents had regularized their originally undocumented status. Illegal immigration has been one of the most recurrent themes in Puerto Rican news media during the first decade of the 21st century.

Illegal trips usually take place in yolas (small wooden boats), usually overcrowded, as trip planners and boat captains seek to realize the greatest profit from the ventures. A trip on a yola takes 26–28 hours and takes place over the Puerto Rico Trench (an underwater crater area) or through the Mona Passage. Accounts by survivors include people being either eaten alive by sharks or forced to jump into the sea when there is a danger of sinking. Others tell of seeing their loved ones left behind to drown after a heavy wave has overturned one of these yolas, and many others tell of corpses left on board. Travelers sometimes die of starvation or dehydration since the yolas can get lost out at sea for days, and many have no type of navigation equipment on board to steer them in the right direction.

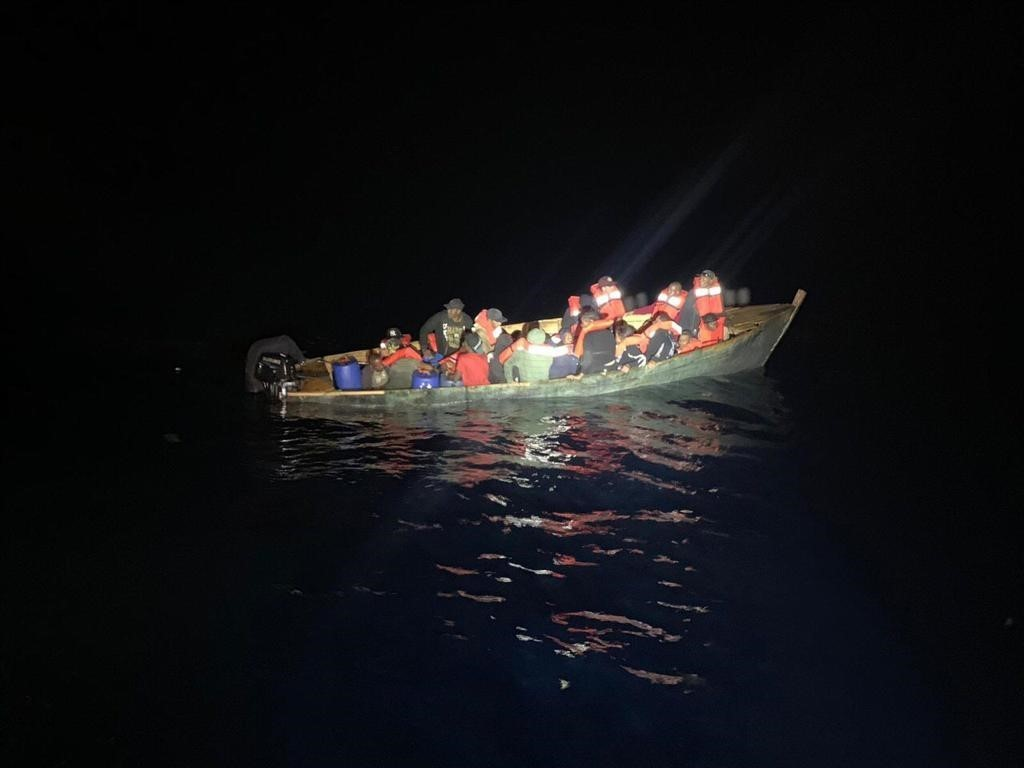
The Coast Guard Cutter Escanaba (WMEC-907) interdicted this 30-foot yola with 28 migrants on board in the Mona Passage on May 21, 2019. The overloaded vessel has a pronounced list towards starboard, emphasizing the dangerous nature of these voyages.

Noted tragedies on such trips include a 1989 sinking near Mona Island where as many as 500 perished, and other, comparatively small tragedies where groups of 30 or more passengers have died. Perhaps the most famous of these tragic trips was the Nagua Tragedy, named so because the yola heading to Puerto Rico that time sunk while trying to make its way out of a beach in Nagua. More than one hundred died, including the boat's captain and the trip planner.

In November 2008, a group of 33 illegal Dominican migrants who were en route to Puerto Rico were forced to resort to cannibalism after they were lost at sea for over 15 days before being rescued by a U.S. Coast Guard patrol boat.

Not all illegal trips to Puerto Rico from the Dominican Republic end in tragedy. These trips are massively scheduled by traffickers, who sometimes travel up to three times each week from Puerto Rico to illegally bring Dominicans. But, because of the large amount of lives that have been lost in many of these trips, both the governments of Puerto Rico and the Dominican Republic have launched mass media campaigns to try to reduce them. In the Dominican Republic, videos of dead bodies on the water are shown on television to try to deter people from travelling to Puerto Rico on yolas. The traffickers face long periods in jail if caught, whereas the travelers are deported to the Dominican Republic, where they do not face criminal charges.

In 2009 an order was given by Governor Luis Fortuño to shut off essential services, such as water and electricity, to Villas del Sol, a shantytown within the municipality of Toa Baja. The shantytown consisted mainly of homes built illegally on flood-prone government-owned land. The Federal Emergency Management Agency bought these homes from the Puerto Rican Government in order to keep them from being used further. In January 2010 the island government began demolishing some of the homes whose residents are both U.S. citizens and undocumented aliens, mainly of Dominican origin.

== Current circumstances ==
About 67% of Dominicans in Puerto Rico are legal citizens.

The 2010 census estimated a population of 68,036 Dominicans in Puerto Rico, equal to 1.8% of the Commonwealth's population. Majority of Dominicans in Puerto Rico live in the San Juan metropolitan area, chiefly the cities of San Juan, Bayamón, and Carolina. Data from the 2000 census shows that 55% of this group lived in San Juan municipality, 11% in Carolina, and 7% in Bayamón. San Juan is about 13% Dominican, though there are high levels of integration and assimilation among Dominicans in Puerto Rico, the highest concentrations on the island can be found in eastern sections of San Juan near Carolina, in eastern Santurce and the Rio Piedras (Oriente, Sabana Llana) district, where they represent up to one-quarter of the residents. Smaller numbers of Dominicans settle the west coast (around Mayagüez) of Puerto Rico due to proximity to Hispaniola.

== Notable immigrants and descendants ==
- Arcángel - singer, rapper and songwriter
- José Alberto "El Canario" - singer
- J Alvarez - reggaeton artist (born in Puerto Rico to Dominican immigrants)
- Nancy Alvarez - psychologist and talk show host
- Ramón Emeterio Betances - revolutionary (Dominican father)
- Shanira Blanco - beauty pageant contestant and director (Dominican father)
- Charytín - actress and singer
- Michelle Colón – Miss Universe Puerto Rico 2021 (Dominican mother)
- Leo Cruz - world champion boxer
- Lisa M - rapper, singer, composer, dancer, and record producer (Dominican mother)
- Luny Tunes - Dominican-born reggaeton duo from Lynn, Massachusetts and Puerto Rico
- Deevani - reggaeton singer
- Edwin Encarnación - professional baseball player
- Jaime Espinal - Olympic medal-winning wrestler
- Magali Febles - beautician and international beauty pageant expert
- Bartolomé Gamundi - businessman and former government official
- Julio Gervacio - world champion boxer
- José Luis González - author
- Aideliz Hidalgo - beauty pageant contestant
- Ozuna - Latin Trap and Reggaeton artist (Dominican father).
- Bodine Koehler - beauty pageant contestant
- Miguelito - rapper (Dominican father)
- Amaury Nolasco - actor (born in Puerto Rico to Dominican immigrants)
- Pedro Saúl Pérez - advocate for the rights of Dominicans living in Puerto Rico
- Rafael José - television personality (Dominican father)
- Shalim Ortiz - actor and singer (son of Charytin)
- Marian Pabón - actress, singer, comedian (Dominican father)
- Romeo Santos - singer, songwriter, and record producer (Dominican father and Puerto Rican mother)
- Jorge Posada - professional baseball player
- Birmania Ríos - television journalist
- Rosangela Abreu Crespo - singer
- Ludo Vika - actress
- Sandra Zaiter - actress and television host
- Nicky Jam - reggaeton performer (Dominican mother)

== See also ==
- Dominican people
- Afro-Dominicans
- Demographics of Puerto Rico
- Royal Decree of Graces of 1815
