= Miss Universe Puerto Rico 2022 =

66th edition of Miss Universe Puerto Rico pageant

- Date: August 11, 2022
- Presenters: Estefanía Soto; Julio Rivera-Saniel
- Entertainment: Gloria Trevi; Jencarlos Canela; Víctor Manuelle
- Venue: Luis A. Ferré Performing Arts Center, San Juan, Puerto Rico
- Broadcaster: WAPA-TV
- Entrants: 28
- Placements: 15
- Winner: Ashley Ann Cariño; Fajardo

Miss Universe Puerto Rico 2022 was the 66th Miss Universe Puerto Rico pageant, held at the Luis A. Ferré Performing Arts Center in San Juan, Puerto Rico, on August 11, 2022.

Michelle Colón of Loíza crowned Ashley Cariño of Fajardo as her successor at the end of the event. Cariño represented Puerto Rico at Miss Universe 2022, where she placed in the Top 5.

== Results ==
=== Placements ===
Placement	Contestant
Miss Universe Puerto Rico 2022	Fajardo – Ashley Ann Cariño Barreto
1st Runner-Up	Dorado – Leonela Gonzalez De Jesús
2nd Runner-Up	Cataño – Camille Fabery Diana
Top 5	Aguadilla – Graciela Berrios; Toa Alta – Valeria Pagán Masini
Top 10	Adjuntas – Mariana Torres Bernard; Coamo - Edith Enid Bernardi Santiago; Salinas – Kiara Rosado Romero; San Juan – Raishmar Carrillo González; Vega Alta – Diana Carolina Sostre Navarro
Top 15	Barranquitas – Sarah Angely Rodríguez Ríos; Camuy – Katherine Santiago; Luquillo – Danelly Olivo Figueroa; Orocovis – Elaine Marie Rosado Rivera; Río Grande – Susanlee Forty Vázquez

=== Special awards ===
Award	Winner
Miss Photogenic	Isabela – Annelise Torres Colón
Miss Friendship	Mayagüez – Ariana Hernández Colón
Most Beautiful Skin	Fajardo – Ashley Cariño
Most Beautiful Hair	Adjuntas – Mariana Torres Bernard

== Contestants ==
28 contestants competed for the title:

Municipality	Delegate	Age	Height	Placement
Adjuntas	Mariana Torres Bernard	24	5 ft 7 in (1.70 m)	Top 10
Aguadilla	Graciela Berrios	18	6 ft 0 in (1.83 m)	Top 5
Arroyo	Alexandra Krystal Rivera Berrios	23	5 ft 5 in (1.65 m)	
Barranquitas	Sarah Angely Rodríguez Ríos	28	5 ft 4 in (1.63 m)	Top 15
Bayamón	Yanisse Vásquez	24	5 ft 5 in (1.65 m)	
Caguas	Erica Iveliss Ortiz	28	5 ft 6 in (1.68 m)	
Camuy	Katherine Santiago	26	5 ft 5 in (1.65 m)	Top 15
Cataño	Camille Fabery Diana	21	5 ft 6 in (1.68 m)	2nd Runner Up
Ciales	Valeria Villalobos Colón	19	5 ft 7 in (1.70 m)	
Coamo	Edith Enid Bernardi Santiago	27	5 ft 7 in (1.70 m)	Top 10
Dorado	Leonela Gonzalez De Jesús	23	5 ft 8 in (1.73 m)	1st Runner up
Fajardo	Ashley Ann Cariño Barreto	28	5 ft 11 in (1.80 m)	Miss Universe Puerto Rico 2022
Guaynabo	Ariana Paola Salgado Burgos	27	5 ft 8 in (1.73 m)	
Humacao	Isabel Jolie Torres	18	5 ft 8 in (1.73 m)	
Isabela	Annelise Torres Colón	25	5 ft 6 in (1.68 m)	
Lajas	Paula Estefanía Mulero Nazario	18	5 ft 6 in (1.68 m)	
Luquillo	Danelly Olivo Figueroa	23	5 ft 5 in (1.65 m)	Top 15
Mayagüez	Ariana Hernández Colón	20	5 ft 5 in (1.65 m)	
Orocovis	Elaine Marie Rosado Rivera	23	5 ft 8 in (1.73 m)	Top 15
Rincón	Andrea Paola Arroyo García	26	5 ft 7 in (1.70 m)	
Río Grande	Susanlee Forty Vázquez	26	5 ft 6 in (1.68 m)	Top 15
Salinas	Kiara Rosado Romero	27	5 ft 5 in (1.65 m)	Top 10
San Juan	Raishmar Carrillo González	26	5 ft 3 in (1.60 m)	Top 10
San Lorenzo	Kiara Jeniva Vélez	24	5 ft 7 in (1.70 m)	
San Sebastián	Anaysha Rivero Lugo	20	5 ft 4 in (1.63 m)	
Toa Alta	Valeria Pagán Masini	25	5 ft 8 in (1.73 m)	Top 5
Vega Alta	Diana Carolina Sostre Navarro	27	5 ft 4 in (1.63 m)	Top 10
Vega Baja	Sheilian Marte	26	5 ft 5 in (1.65 m)	

== Judges ==
=== Preliminary ===
- Luz Nereida Vélez – News anchor and journalist
- Vivian Santiago – Lawyer and businesswoman
- Carlos Izcoa – Oral rehabilitation specialist
- Ana Teresa Toro – Journalist, writer, and columnist
- Germán Legarreta – Executive producer and casting director
- Frances Ríos – Businesswoman and founder of Woman Who Lead
- Eli Cay – Model, actor, and entertainer

=== Final ===
- Melina León – Singer and actress
- Yolandita Monge – Singer
- Jeimy Osorio – Actress
- Byankah Sobá – Journalist
- Ada Monzón – Meteorologist
- Mariana Vicente – Miss Puerto Rico Universe 2010 from Río Grande
- Joe Bonilla – Artist manager and publicist
- Luis Ortiz Espinoza – Dermatologist
- Carlos M. Portocarrero – Plastic surgeon

== Crossovers ==
Miss USA

- 2021: Fajardo – Ashley Ann Cariño Barreto (as Miss Florida USA; 2nd Runner-Up)

Miss World Puerto Rico

- 2021: San Juan – Raishmar Carrillo González (as Miss Río Grande World; 3rd Runner-Up)

== See also ==
Preceded by {{{before}}}	Miss Universe Puerto Rico; 2022	Succeeded by –
