= Miss Florida USA =

American beauty pageant competition

- Formation: 1952
- Type: Beauty pageant
- Headquarters: Hollywood, Florida
- Location: Florida
- Members: Miss USA
- Official language: English
- Key people: Jaclyn Stapp
- Website: missfloridausa.com

The Miss Florida USA competition is the pageant that selects the representative for the state of Florida in the Miss USA pageant.

Up until the 2017 pageant, both Miss and Teen state pageants were held separately in different months. In recent years, the organization was decided that both pageants would compete at the same time from 2018 onwards, just like the most of state pageants in the Miss USA system.

While Florida has had number of runners-up, finalists, and semi-finalists, the state has yet to win the Miss USA title. Although Cheryl Patton, who placed 2nd runner-up in Miss USA 1967, became Miss USA after Sylvia Hitchcock won Miss Universe. The most recent placement was Caroline Dixon who placed Top 20 in 2023.

Three former Miss Florida Teen USA titleholders have won this competition, and five titleholders have also competed at Miss America.

In 2019, contestant Madison Anderson (who finished first runner-up in that pageant) would go on to become Miss Universe Puerto Rico 2019, and then competed in Miss Universe 2019, placed first runner-up to Zozibini Tunzi of South Africa. On August 11, 2022, contestant Ashley Cariño (who finished second runner-up at Miss USA 2021) was crowned Miss Universe Puerto Rico 2022 and represented Puerto Rico at Miss Universe 2022, ultimately placing in the Top 5

The current titleholder is Aileen Cerchiara of Tampa and was crowned on July 12, 2026, at the Linda W. Chapin Theater in Orlando. She will represent Florida at Miss USA 2026.

== Gallery of titleholders ==
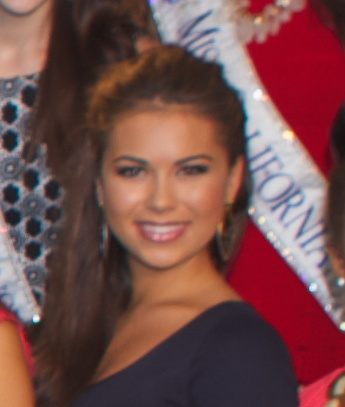
Monique Evans, Miss Florida USA 2020

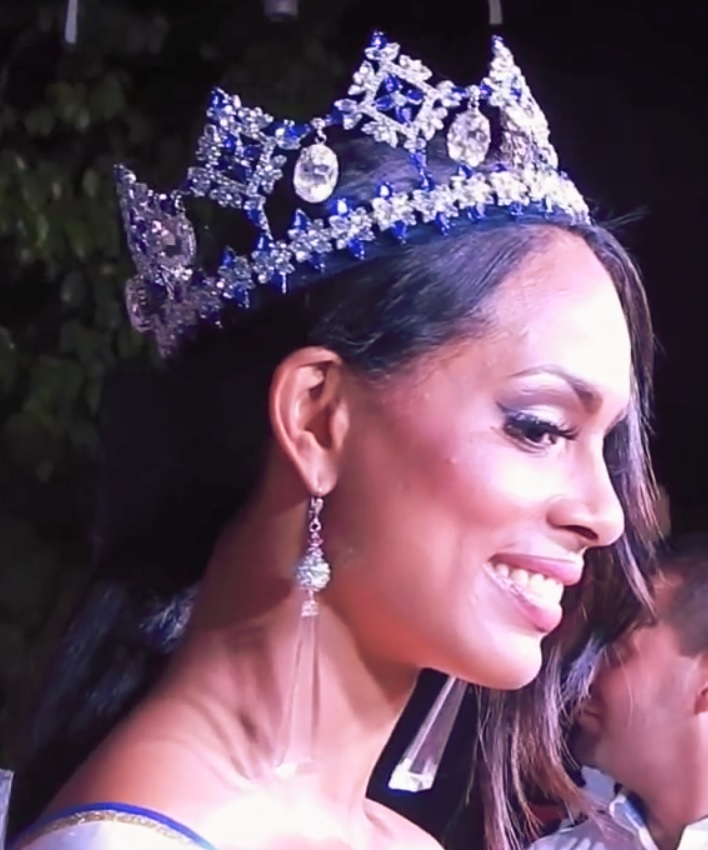
Génesis Dávila, Miss Florida USA 2018

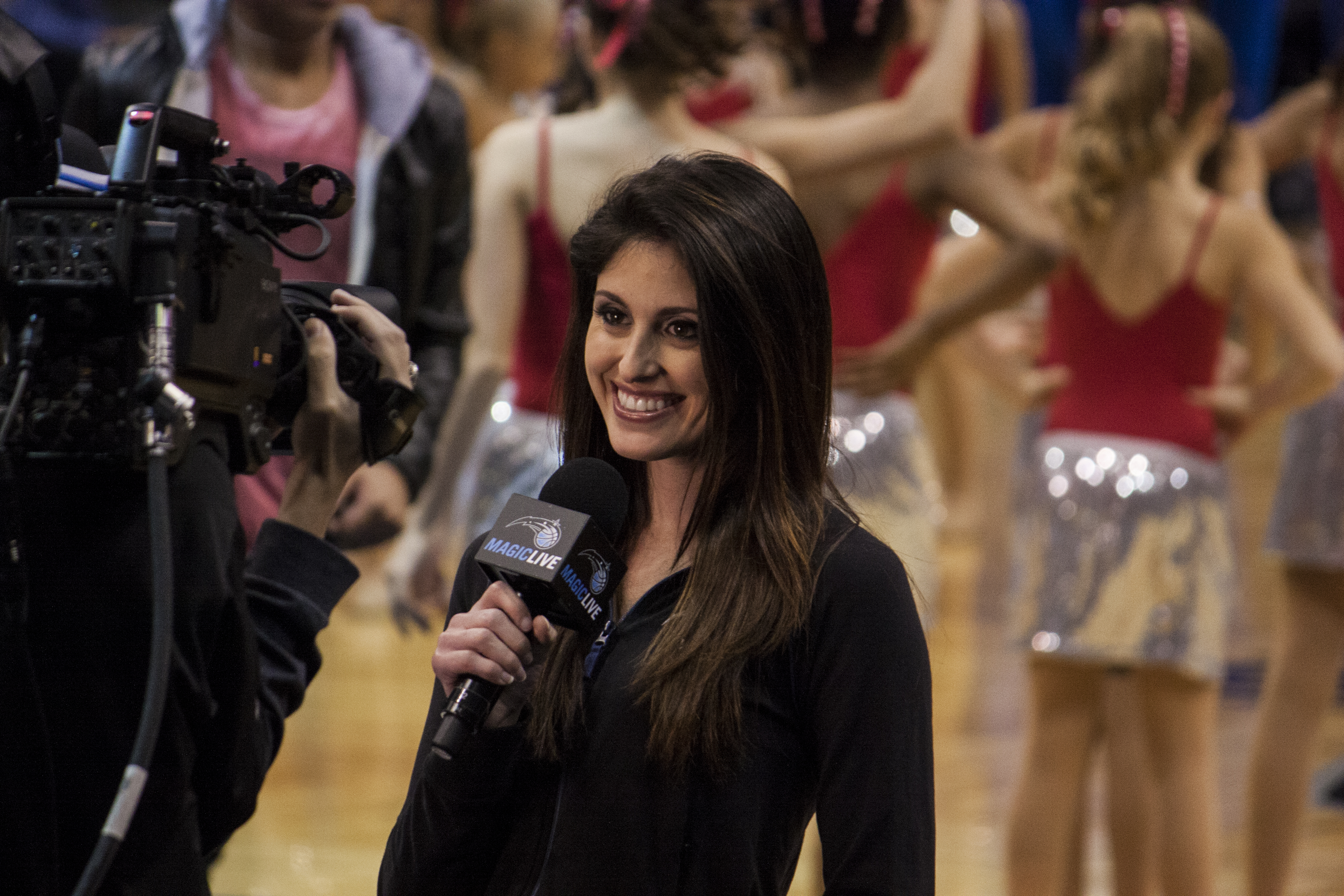
Megan Clementi, Miss Florida USA 2010

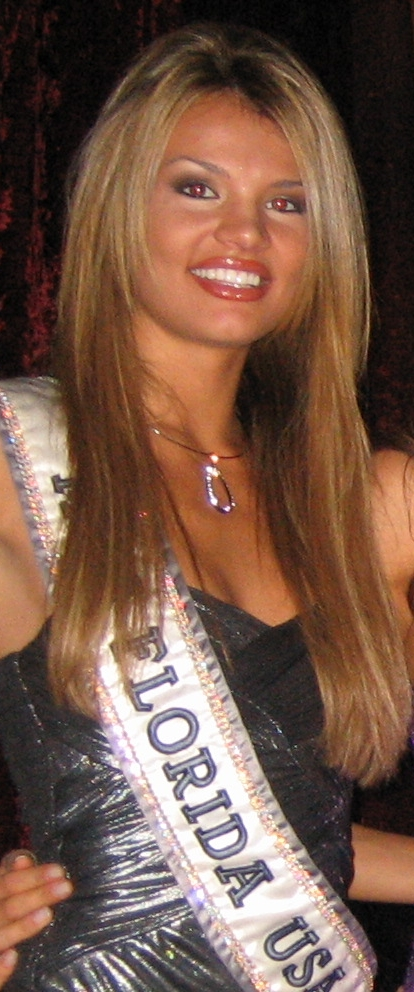
Jessica Rafalowski, Miss Florida USA 2008

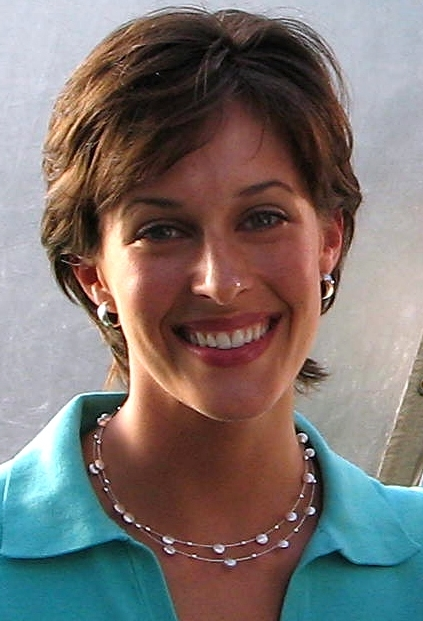
Jenna Edwards, Miss Florida USA 2007

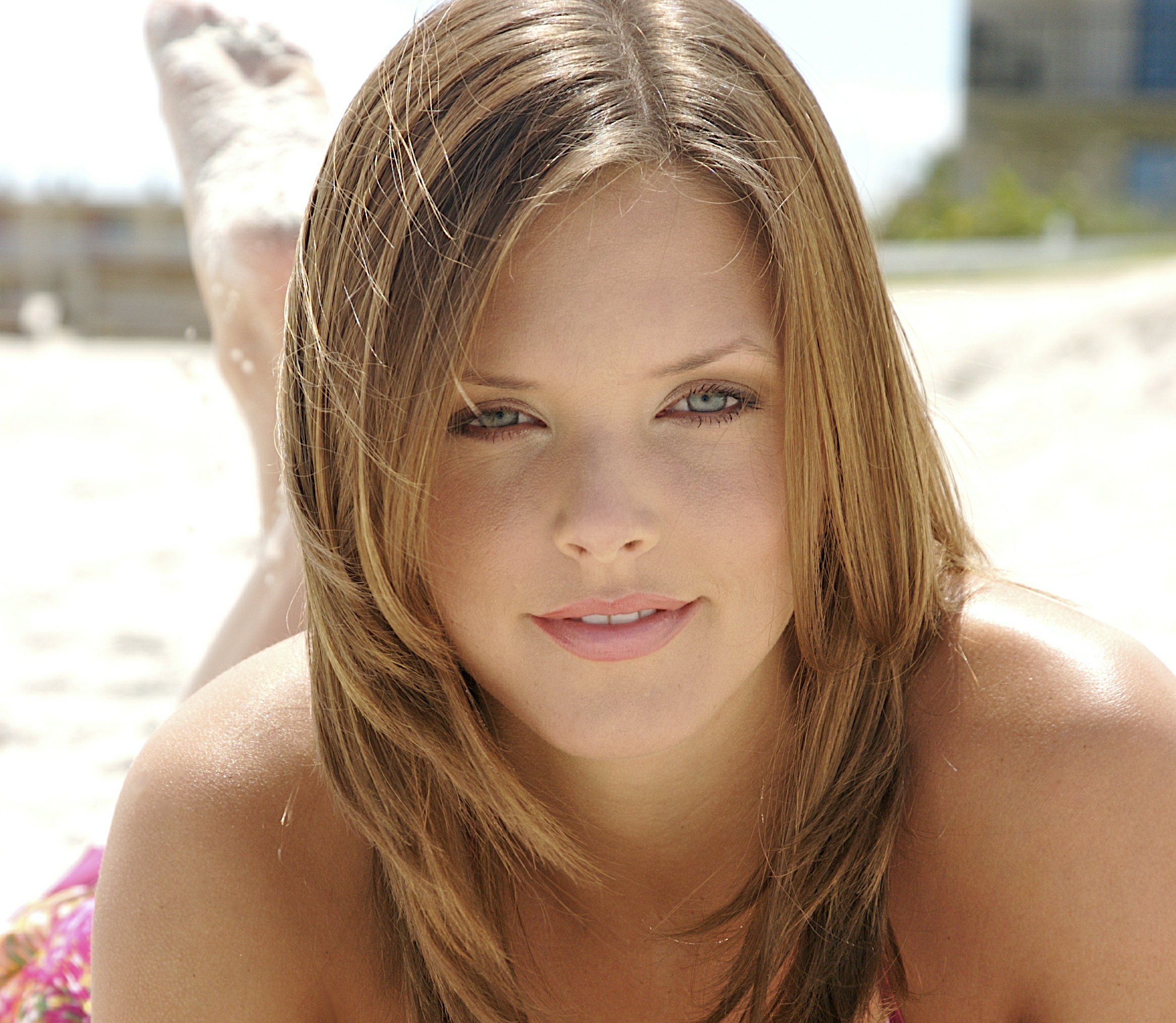
Melissa Witek, Miss Florida USA 2005

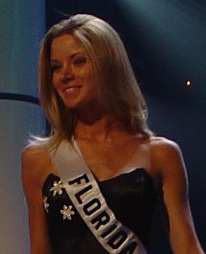
Kristen Berset, Miss Florida USA 2004

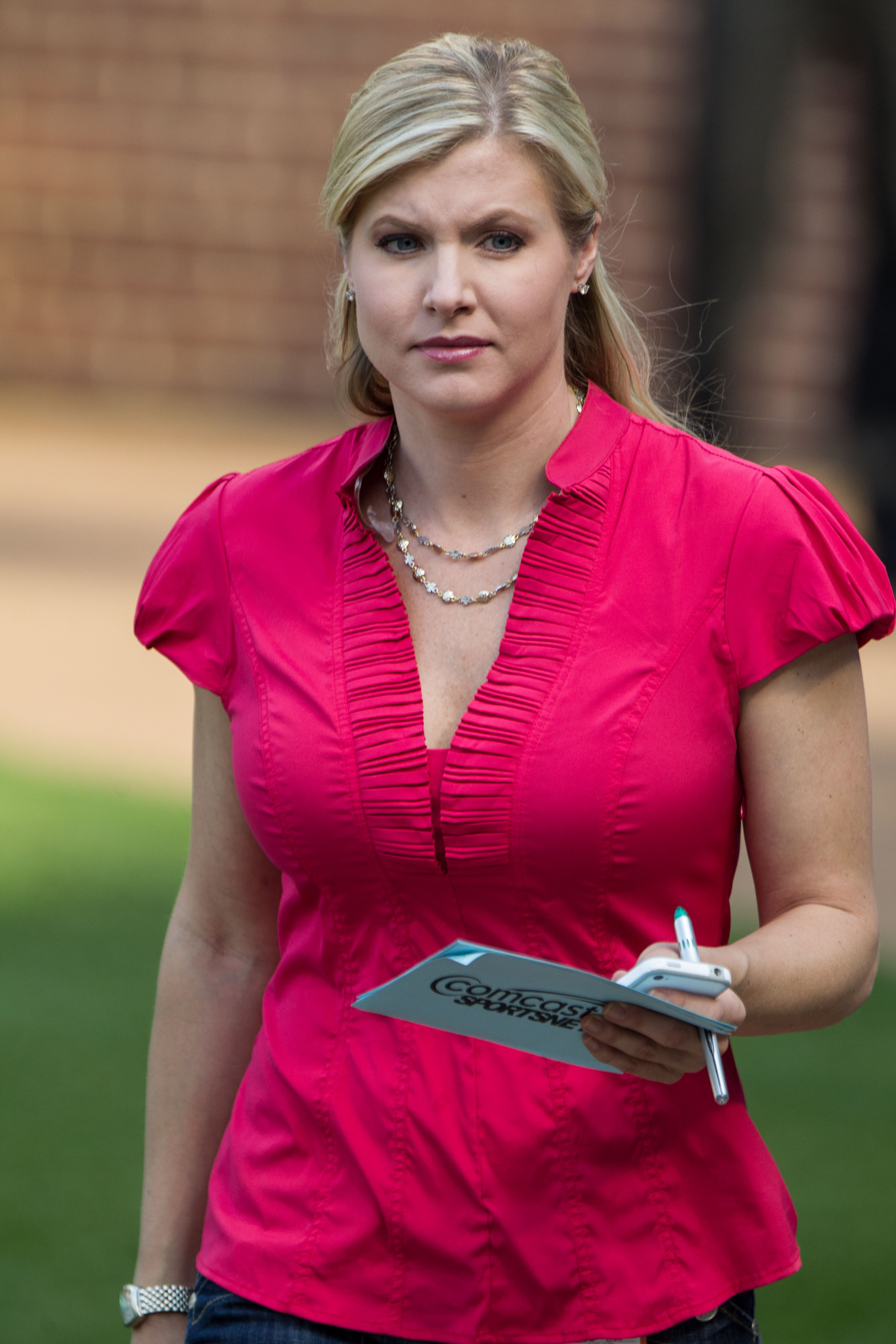
Julie Donaldson, Miss Florida USA 2001

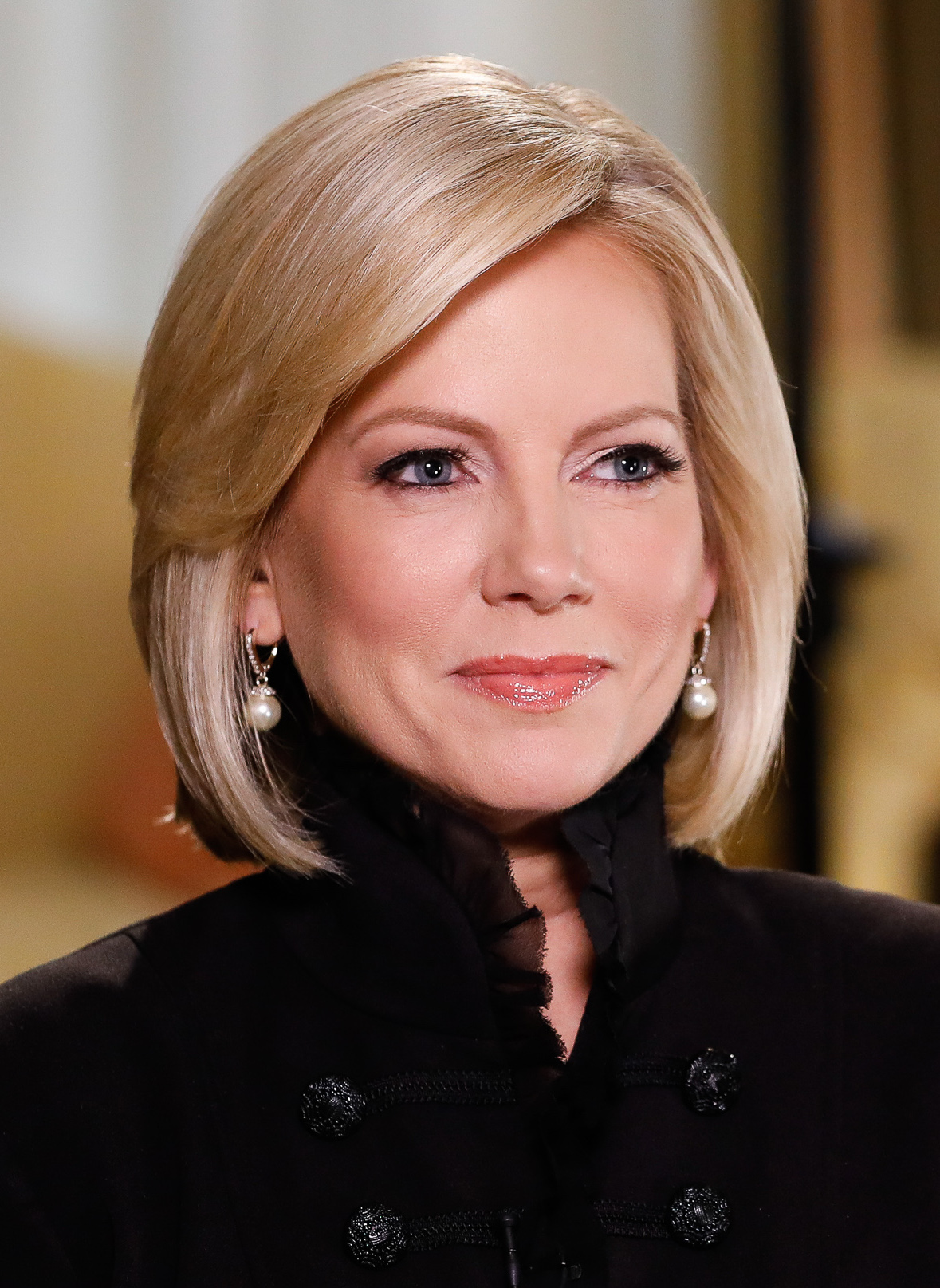
Shannon Dupuy, Miss Florida USA 1995

== Results summary ==
=== Placements ===
- 1st runners-up: Marcia Valibus (1958), Clotilde "Cloe" Cabrera (1987), Aileen Cerchiara (2026)
- 2nd runners-up: Nanita Greene (1959), Cheryl Patton (1967), (Note: Cheryl Patton was 2nd runner-up at Miss USA, but succeeded to the Miss USA title when Sylvia Hitchcock became Miss Universe.) Barbara Bowser (1980), Ashley Cariño (2021)
- 3rd runners-up: Connie Ensor (1972), Mary-Margaret Humes (1975), Monica Farrell (1988)
- 4th runners-up: Nancy Wakefield (1960), Randy Beard (1966), Melissa Witek (2005), Cristin Duren (2006), Brittany Oldehoff (2014)
- Top 5/6: Shannon Dupuy (1995), Angelia Savage (1997), Génesis Dávila (2018)
- Top 10/12: Susan Deaton (1971), Stacy Evans (1973), Cynthia Zach (1974), April Shaw (1978), Kristen Berset (2004), Jessica Rafalowski (2008), Nicolette Jennings (2019), Lou Schieffelin (2025)
- Top 15/16/20: Kay Duggar (1953), Mariles Gessler (1955), Maria Junquera (1969), Cheryl Johnson (1970), Lissette Garcia (2011), Caroline Dixon (2023)

Florida holds a record of 32 placements at Miss USA.

=== Awards ===
- Miss Photogenic: Shannon Ford (2002), Cristin Duren (2006)
- Miss Congeniality: Linda LeFevre (1977)
- Best State Costume: Nancy England (1963)

== Winners ==
Color key

- Declared as Winner
- Ended as runner-up or finalist
- Ended as one of the semifinalists

Year	Name	Hometown	Age (Note: Age at the time of the Miss USA pageant)	Local title	Placement at Miss USA	Special awards at Miss USA	Notes
2026	Aileen Cerchiara	Tampa	26	Miss Gulf Coast	1st runner-up		
2025	Lou Schieffelin	Winter Park	25	Miss Palm Beach Island	Top 10		Previously Miss Florida Teen USA 2018; Top 10 at Miss Teen USA 2018
2024	Peyton Lewis	Orlando	26	Miss Lake Nona			
2023	Caroline Dixon	Palm Harbor	25	Miss Palm Harbor	Top 20		
2022	Taylor Fulford	Okeechobee	27	Miss Okeechobee			
2021	Ashley Ann Cariño Barreto	Kissimmee	26	Miss South Kissimmee	2nd runner-up		Miss Universe Puerto Rico 2022, Top 5 at Miss Universe 2022; Previously Miss Florida World 2018 as Ashley Barreto; Born in Puerto Rico; Shortest reigning titleholder (10 months and 11 days)
2020	Monique Elyse Evans	Naples	28	Miss South Naples			Previously Miss Texas 2014; Top 16 semifinalist at Miss America 2015, University of Texas graduate; Longest reigning Miss Florida USA (1 year, 5 months, and 29 days)
2019	Nicolette Taylor Jennings	Clearwater	22	Miss Clearwater Beach	Top 10		
2018	Génesis María Dávila Pérez	Miami	27	Miss Miami	Top 5		Previously Miss Florida USA 2017; see below; Previously Miss World Puerto Rico 2014; Born in Puerto Rico
2017	Linette De Los Santos	Sunny Isles Beach	24	Miss Sunny Isles Beach			Originally first runner-up; succeeded the title after Génesis Dávila was dethroned; Born in Dominican Republic
2017	Génesis María Dávila Pérez	Miami	25	Miss Miami Beach	did not compete		Davila was dethroned on July 22, 2016, after it was revealed that she allegedly hired outside hair and makeup professionals during the Miss Florida USA state pageant instead of the ones provided by the organization, which is explicitly against pageant rules. The pageant stated it gave Dávila an unfair advantage. She was later found to be innocent of the accusation.
2016	Briegitte Marie "Brie" Gabrielle Baldrica	Palm Beach	25	Miss Palm Beach			
2015	Ashleigh Lollie	Grand Ridge	25	Miss Emerald Coast			
2014	Brittany Oldehoff	Fort Lauderdale	24	Miss Fort Lauderdale	4th Runner-Up		Model in season 7 of Project Runway; Contestant on season 28 of The Amazing Race
2013	Michelle Aguirre	Hialeah	20	Miss Broward County Fair			
2012	Karina Alexandra Brez	Wellington	23	Miss South Florida			Born in Ukraine
2011	Lissette Garcia	Miami	25	Miss Miami Tropic	Top 16 Semi-finalist		Previously Miss Reina Hispanoamerica Cuba 2007; Top 8 finalist in Reina Hispanoamericana 2007
2010	Megan Clementi	Orlando	25	Miss South Miami			Top 10 at National Sweetheart 2006
2009	Anastagia Pierre	Plantation	20	Miss Plantation			Previously Miss Florida Teen USA 2004; Later Miss Bahamas Universe 2011
2008	Jessica Rafalowski	DeLand	21	Miss Volusia County	Top 10 Finalist, Finishing in 8th Place		Miss Polonia World 2010
2007	Jenna Edwards	North Miami	25	Miss North Miami			Previously Miss Florida 2004; Miss Oktoberfest 2000 as Miss Mississippi; Miss Teen All American 1999 as Miss Mississippi
2006	Cristin Leigh Duren	Panama City	24	Miss Emerald Coast	4th runner-up	Miss Photogenic	Previously Miss Florida Teen USA 1997; First woman to win Miss Photogenic at Miss Teen USA and Miss USA
2005	Melissa Ann Witek	Cocoa Beach	24	Miss Florida Panhandle	4th runner-up		Contestant on NBC's Treasure Hunters
2004	Kristen Michele Berset	St. Petersburg	22	Miss Central Florida	Top 10 Finalist, Finishing in 6th Place		
2003	Carrie Ann Mewha	Fort Lauderdale	24	Miss Broward			
2002	Shannon Ford	Miami	25	Miss Miami		Miss Photogenic	Miami Dolphins NFL Cheerleader and a contestant on the third season of The Bachelor
2001	Julie Anne Donaldson	Ponte Vedra Beach	23	Miss Ponte Vedra Beach			Hired as the NFL's first female team broadcaster in 2020 for the Washington Football Team
2000	Kristin Alicia Beall Ludecke	Eustis	23	Miss Eustis		Style Award	Previously Miss Florida 1995; daughter of Miss Florida USA 1970 Cheryl Johnson
1999	Melissa Andrea Quesada	Tampa					Miss Teen All American 1995; Miss United States Teen 1997
1998	Jamie Converse	Gainesville					Later Mrs. Florida America 2007 under her married name, Jamie Converse-Estrada.
1997	Angelia Savage	Jacksonville	25		Top 6 Finalist, Finishing in 4th Place		
1996	Idalmis Marina Vidal	Miami	21				
1995	Shannon Noelle Depuy	Tallahassee	24		Top 6 Finalist, Finishing in 4th Place		Previously Miss Virginia 1990 and semifinalist in Miss America 1991
1994	Cynthia Redding	Deltona					
1993	Shakeela Gajadha	Coral Gables					
1992	Sharon Flynn Belden	Coral Gables					Later Miss Florida World 1992; Miss World America 1992 and Top 10 semi-finalist at Miss World 1992
1991	Rosa Velilla	Miami					
1990	Tricia Hahn	Panama City					
1989	Jennifer Louise Parker	Tallahassee	17				
1988	Monica Bruni Farrell	Jacksonville			3rd runner-up		Previously Miss Florida 1985
1987	Clotilde "Cloe" Helen Cabrera	Tampa	22		1st runner-up		First African American to win Miss Florida USA; Competed at Miss World 1987
1986	Kathy Rosenwinkel	Orlando					
1985	Barbi Losh	North Miami Beach	21				
1984	Stacy Hassfurder	Tallahassee	20				
1983	Janet Chesser	Daytona Beach					
1982	Lisa Smith	Margate					Previously Miss Florida World 1980; Top 10 finalist in Miss World America 1980.
1981	Valerie Ann Lundeen	Miami					Valerie Lundeen Ely, 62, married to "Tarzan" actor Ron Ely, was murdered by their son Cameron Ely at their Southern California home on October 15, 2019.
1980	Barbara Ann Bowser	Miami Springs	20		2nd runner-up		
1979	Penny Sheridan	Merritt Island					
1978	April Shaw	Lakeland			Semi-finalist		
1977	Linda LeFevre	Gainesville				Miss Congeniality	
1976	Leigh Walsh	Coral Gables					
1975	Mary-Margaret Humes	Holly Hill	20		3rd runner-up		actress best known for playing Gail Leery on the television drama Dawson's Creek.
1974	Cynthia Zach	Miami			Semi-finalist		
1973	Stacy Evans	Daytona Beach			Semi-finalist		
1972	Coni Ensor	Miami			3rd runner-up		
1971	Susan Aileen Deaton	Jacksonville		Miss Jacksonville	Semi-finalist		
1970	Cheryl Elizabeth Johnson	Eustis			Semi-finalist		Mother of Miss Florida USA 2000 Kristin Ludecke, Previously crowned Miss Dixie 1967.
1969	Maria Junquera	Plant City			Semi-finalist		
1968	Leslie Bauer	New Port Richey					
1967	Cheryl Ann Patton	North Miami Beach			2nd runner-up		Became Miss USA 1967 after Sylvia Hitchcock became Miss Universe 1967 and 1st runner up declined to succeed the title.
1966	Randy Beard	Kissimmee			4th runner-up		
1965	Karol Kelly	Zephyrhills					semifinalist in Miss American Beauty 1967, title of usa rep to Miss International pageant
1964	Candace Davenport						
1963	Linda Egland	South Miami	18			Best State Costume	
1962	Sharon Conrad						
1961	Peggy Defreitas						
1960	Nancy Wakefield				4th runner-up		
1959	Nanita Greene				2nd runner-up		
1958	Marcia Valibus				1st runner-up		Competed in the 1958 Miss Dixie Pageant
1957	Deanie Cates						
1956	Kim Meyer						
1955	Mariles Gessler				Semi-finalist		
1954	Rosemary Talucci						
1953	Kay Duggar				Semi-finalist		Competed as "Miss Miami Beach" instead of Miss Florida USA.
1952	Yvonne Peairs						
