= Laird Macintosh =

American actor (born 1962)

- Born: Laird Rattray; June 27, 1962 (age 64); Evanston, Illinois, U.S.
- Occupations: Actor; comedian
- Years active: 1987–present

Laird Macintosh (born June 27, 1962) is an American actor and comedian. He is best known as the host of the NBC reality television program Treasure Hunters.

Among his credits is the television series Hannah Montana, on which he portrayed a Secret Service agent. He also appeared in the episode "Charlie and Jordan Go to Prison" on the sitcom Anger Management.

Macintosh is a member of The Groundlings, a Los Angeles-based sketch and improv comedy troupe.

Laird's real surname is Rattray, as he uses his mother's maiden name. His younger sister, Heather Rattray, is also an actress.

== Filmography ==
=== Film ===
Year	Title	Role
1995	Murder in the First	Reporter
1998	Saving Private Ryan	Soldier on the Beach
2000	Nurse Betty	Dr. Lonnie Walsh
2000	Rules of Engagement	Radio Op
2004	Alexander	Greek Officer
2005	The Great Raid	2nd Lt. O'Grady
2010	Pickin' & Grinnin'	Deputy Jerry
2013	Feeding Mr. Baldwin	Spencer Shaw
2016	Dance Camp	Judge Keating
2016	XOXO	Mr. Henderson
2018	Making Babies	Officer Powers
2021	Fear and Loathing in Aspen	Sheriff Carrol Whitmire
2024	McCurdy Point	Hollis Marston

=== Television ===
Year	Title	Role	Notes
1987	Hotel	Young Man	1 episode
1989	The Bold and the Beautiful	Caterer	1 episode
1990	Tales from the Crypt	Bo-Hunk	1 episode
1996	Caroline in the City	George	1 episode
1998	Sliders	Magg Corporal	1 episode
1999	Jack & Jill	Designer	2 episodes
2001	Band of Brothers	F Company Trooper / Jeep Driver	2 episodes; TV miniseries
2003	One on One	Craig Simpson	1 episode
2004	NCIS	Corporal Stinson	1 episode
2005	Hot Properties	Doctor	2 episodes
2005	CSI: NY	Dr. Spencer Howard	1 episode
2005–2006	Ultimate Playground	Host	TV series
2006	Treasure Hunters	Host	NBC reality series
2007	Hannah Montana	Agent Kaplon	1 episode
2009	CSI: Miami	Mitch Crawford	1 episode
2011–2018	Jimmy Kimmel Live!	Various	11 episodes
2012	Modern Family	Realtor #3	1 episode
2012	Prodigy Bully	Chuck Collins	TV film
2012	Victorious	Carl Gibbons	1 episode
2012–2019	Tosh.0	Various	7 episodes
2013	Key & Peele	Jamie Thorneburg	1 episode
2013	Lab Rats	Agent Ryker	1 episode
2014	Anger Management	Peter	1 episode
2014	Hot in Cleveland	Ram	1 episode
2015	NCIS: Los Angeles	Plastic Surgeon	1 episode
2015	Young & Hungry	Mr. Stubner	1 episode
2016	Scorpion	Captain Ryan Jackson	1 episode
2016–2020	Mike Tyson Mysteries	Various (voice)	3 episodes
2017	The Mick	Christopher	5 episodes
2017	Tim Timmerman: Hope of America	Senator Pete Anderson	
2017	Powerless	Royce Kane	1 episode
2018	Shameless	Andrew	1 episode
2019	Your Pretty Face Is Going to Hell	Archie Shoemaker	1 episode
2019	Tacoma FD	Chet Chisholm	1 episode
2020	A.P. Bio	Mark	1 episode
2021	Rebel	Marvin	1 episode
2025	The Chit Show	Richard	1 episode
2026	56 Days	Caspar (voice)	1 episode
