= Treasure Hunters (TV series) =

- Starring: Laird Macintosh (host)
- Composers: Sean Callery; Biff Saunders
- Country of origin: United States
- Original language: English
- No. of seasons: 1
- No. of episodes: 12

Production
- Executive producers: Dan Cutforth; Jane Lipstiz; Brian Grazer; Dabid Nevins; Tom Mazza; Jak Severson; Danica Krislovich
- Producers: Noel A. Guerra; Javier Winnik; Tony Sacco; Craig Spirko
- Running time: 60 minutes (per episode)
- Production companies: Imagine Television; Magical Elves; Madison Road Entertainment; NBCUniversal Television Studio

Original release
- Network: NBC (US); Global (Canada)
- Release: June 18 – August 21, 2006

Treasure Hunters is a reality television series on NBC (US) and Global (Canada) in which ten teams of three solve puzzles and complete challenges in hopes of solving the ultimate puzzle and winning the grand prize. Teams travel across the United States and Europe in search of seven "artifacts" which when assembled will "lead to the key. Find the key, and find the treasure." The challenges and puzzles are spliced with American history, and the ultimate goal is to find a hidden treasure, leading the show to be compared on various occasions to the film National Treasure. The value of the treasure in the series was revealed on the season finale to be $3,000,000.

The two-hour premiere episode aired on June 18, 2006 and beginning June 26 the series moved to its regular Monday night timeslot. The season finale was broadcast live on August 21, 2006.

The Hunt is similar in format to The Amazing Race. Key differences include:

- Teams consist of three members as opposed to The Amazing Race's usual two
- The start location of each leg is not necessarily the end point of the previous leg
- Teams start each leg at the same time; Amazing Race teams have staggered starts based on previous leg finish order
- Amazing Race teams may take no electronic devices with them; Treasure Hunters teams are provided several pieces of electronic equipment, including:
  - a Motorola RAZR cell phone, by which they receive messages and information from host Laird Macintosh;
  - additional phones they may use to call other teams and each other;
  - a laptop computer with "special access" to Ask.com and Orbitz.com;
  - a Garmin GPSMAP 60C GPS unit
- The show focuses more closely on the solving of clues and tasks, which are much more difficult and cryptic than in The Amazing Race; The Amazing Race uses comparatively simple clues, and focuses more closely on the interpersonal relationships within the teams.
- Clues sometimes offer multiple solution methods, and false solutions are incorporated into them.

== Teams and rankings ==
Team name	Members	Leg 1^{‡}	Leg 2	Leg 3	Leg 4^{‡}	Leg 5	Leg 6	Leg 7	Leg 8^{‡}	Result
Team Geniuses	Charles Taylor, 22, Student; Francis Goldshmid, 19, Student; Sam Khurana, 21, Student	9th	6th	1st	6th	4th	2nd	3rd	1st	Winner
Team Air Force	Brooke Rillos, 27, Air Force Officer; Matt Rillos, 26, Air Force Captain; Matt Zitzlsperger, 26, Air Force Officer	1st	1st	6th	1st	5th	1st	1st	2nd^{§}	Eliminated (Leg 8)
Team Southie Boys	John Collins, 32, Mortgage Broker; Matthew Mullen, 36, Firefighter; Martin Mullen, 36, Firefighter	2nd	3rd	4th	3rd	3rd	4th	2nd	3rd^{§}	Eliminated (Leg 8)
Team Ex-CIA	Jacob Porter, 33, Consultant; Mark West, 35, Financial Analyst; Todd Moore, 32, Software Architect	5th	4th	3rd	2nd	2nd	3rd	4th		Eliminated (Leg 7)
Team Miss USA	Melissa Witek, 25, Miss Florida USA; Kaitlyn Christopher, 20, Miss Indiana USA; Kristen Johnson, 24, Miss Kentucky USA	3rd	5th	2nd	5th	1st	5th			Eliminated (Leg 6)
Team Fogal Family	Margie Fogal, 47, Student Service Technician; Kayte Andersen, 25, Teacher; Brad Fogal, 48, Pastor	4th	2nd	5th	4th	6th				Eliminated (Leg 5)
Team Brown Family	Keith Brown, 42, Telecommunications; Tonny Brown, 37, Admin Asst; Terrance Brown, 39, Office Depot	7th	9th^{+}	7th	7th					Eliminated (Leg 4)
Team Wild Hanlons	Josh Hanlon, 19, Student; Patrick (Pat) Hanlon, 38, Small Business Owner; Ben Hanlon, 49, Entrepreneur	8th	8th	8th						Eliminated (Leg 3)
Team Grad Students	Jessica Schilling, 26, Bartender; Melissa Schilling, 26, Bartender; Kathleen Krapfl, 26, Bartender	6th	7th^{+}							Withdrew due to injury (Leg 2)
Team Young Professionals	Taryn Brown, 28, Law Student; Drew Brown, 25, Med Student; Chandra Lewis, 25, Public Relations	10th								Eliminated (Leg 1)

- A red placement indicates the team was eliminated.
- A dark red placement indicates the team withdrew for medical reasons.
- An underlined blue indicates the team was initially eliminated, but was allowed to return due to unforeseen circumstances.
- ^{+}Team Grad Students dropped out after Leg 2 because of injury; Team Brown Family was brought back to replace them.
- ^{§}Teams Air Force and Southie Boys were both eliminated at the same time at the end of Leg 8 once Team Geniuses found the treasure.
- ^{‡}Leg was shown over two episodes.

== The Hunt ==
=== Leg 1 (Alaska/Hawaii → Nebraska → South Dakota) ===
Ten teams started the hunt split into two groups of five, with each group of teams unaware of the other's existence. Five teams started at the Independence Mining Camp in Alaska and the other five started aboard a ship identified as the U.S.S. Jefferson (although the US Navy currently has no ship by that name), off the coast of Hawaii. The first clue for both sets was in the form of a Morse Code message which teams had to decipher. Although none of the teams knew Morse Code offhand, there were guidebooks scattered around the locations.

The Alaska teams headed to Matanuska Glacier where they had to locate a block of ice. The words "Stillwater Washington" were etched on each block, and a map with various destinations was contained inside it, along with the word "dig." Teams had to figure out where to go next by associating the etched clue with a place on the map (the answer was Lake George, Alaska), and tell that location to one of the five awaiting helicopter pilots before they could commence. At Lake George, teams had to dig for a cylinder and a clue directing them to the capitol building in Lincoln, Nebraska.

The Hawaii teams were led by their Morse Code clue to a dive site (Hāna Bay) where they had to locate a metal box containing a pilot's log with the coordinates of the next location, Black Sand Beach. There, the teams had to look for the Monticello crash site, where they had to find a locked box among plane wreckage. A key concealed within a Jeffersonian cane would open the box, but it would not work until assembled along with the handle segment of the cane. Inside the box was a coded map, with a painting on the reverse, and teams received a message to head to Lincoln.

When teams reached Lincoln, they learned that there were not five but ten teams. Each team was paired with one from the other starting point based on their order of arrival in Lincoln. Each pair of teams boarded a bus, which headed away from their next destination. By combining the cylinder found in Alaska (which had a cipher alphabet engraved on it) and the coded map found in Hawaii, teams had to determine their next destination and relay this information to their driver. The decoded message, "Mount Theodore Roosevelt," could be interpreted in two ways: literally, leading to the incorrect location of Mount Theodore Roosevelt, South Dakota; or along with a clue given in a message to consider where the teams have been - Lake George (Washington), USS Jefferson, Lincoln, Nebraska - along with Mount Theodore Roosevelt together point to the four presidents carved on Mount Rushmore, the correct destination. Unbeknownst to – and undiscovered by – the teams, if they had put the two clues together in a different way (by placing the cylinder in the middle of the painting on the back of the map), an image of Mount Rushmore would have been revealed. All teams deduced or guessed the correct destination except for the Young Professionals/Geniuses. After a fruitless search at Mount Roosevelt eventually the Young Professionals/Geniuses called the Wild Hanlons, who gave away the correct destination.

At Mount Rushmore, the teams, no longer working in two-team pairings, had to find a spot on the Presidential Trail where only two of the four presidents could be seen and then follow a smaller path until they found locked boxes containing the first of seven "artifacts" necessary to find the treasure. In this instance, the artifact was a map. The boxes opened with a combination. Teams were earlier given a clue message telling them to pay attention to the natural order of things, but that sometimes history has a way of changing it. This clue referred to the fact that the heads are not in the correct presidential order; Roosevelt and Lincoln are reversed. This led to the correct combination of 1-3-2-6-1-6 (each number referring to the order in which the given President – based on their location in Mount Rushmore – was in office). Team Young Professionals and Team Geniuses raced for the last artifact with the Geniuses eventually finding it.

=== Leg 2 (South Dakota → Montana) ===
Leg 2 was based on the Lewis and Clark Expedition. Beginning at about 2:20 am, teams travelled over 600 mi (965 km), from South Dakota to Lexington Mine in Montana. Teams travelled 10,000 ft (3,050 m) into the mine and searched for the clue, a bucket (which was covered with snakes) inscribed with the words "bend the light." Teams discovered that by filling the bucket with water, the words "Wood Bottom Missouri River Montana" became visible by refraction. Team Southie Boys never found this clue, instead allying with Team Brown Family to leave the Wild Hanlons 11 hours behind them in last place. Teams travelled to the Wood Bottom Recreation Area, from where they would have to canoe in search of the next clue. Canoes could not be in the water after 5:30 pm and no teams arrived at the campsite early enough to launch, so all teams camped there overnight.

The next morning, teams canoed along a 20 mi (32 km) stretch of the Missouri River (including a 3 mi (5 km) portage), following a trail of stars in search of the next clue buried 40 paces behind the fourteenth star. Team Brown Family capsized their canoe, nearly drowning for the second time in as many legs. While portaging, Jessica of Team Grad Students stepped in a hole and injured her ankle. The production team intervened with medical assistance and the team was able to continue with Jessica alternating between crutches and being carried by her teammates. Team Fogal Family misled Teams Ex-CIA and Southie Boys into believing the Fogals were going to stop with them at the 13th star but instead kept paddling after those two teams had docked, which led to contempt for the Fogals (and the expression, "You've been Fogaled!") by the other teams – especially since the Southie Boys had helped the Fogals portage their canoe earlier.

Buried within a fire pit behind the 14th star teams found a table and code key for a double substitution cipher devised by Thomas Jefferson and used by Lewis and Clark, and journal pages describing their next destination, Tower Rock, Montana. At Tower Rock, teams discovered an encrypted sign, which when deciphered read "Follow close and to the right. Look 'neath a rock as dark as night." This led teams to the second artifact, a compass, hidden under black rocks.

The Wild Hanlons spent four hours trying to decipher the clue before Ben decided that they would go get some food. After making an estimated 80 mi (130 km) round trip to a Burger King restaurant, Josh quickly deciphered the message and they were able to find the artifact ahead of Team Brown Family.

=== Leg 3 (Massachusetts) ===
Leg 3 of the Hunt focused on the American Revolution and started from a bed and breakfast in Boston. It is not explained how the teams travelled from Montana to Boston. Prior to the leg, Team Grad Students bid a tearful farewell to the other teams, having been forced to withdraw because of Jessica's injury on the previous leg. Team Brown Family was brought back in their place, to the consternation of Team Wild Hanlons.

All teams travelled to the Old Burke School in search of their first clue for the leg. Everyone followed Boston natives Team Southie Boys except Team Air Force and Team Brown Family. Team Fogal Family called Team Geniuses, who misdirected them. Team Air Force arrived at the school first and discovered a sign reading "Look until you can see no more." In a classroom, they discovered a chalk board with Revolutionary War facts and decided to go to the location of the "shot heard 'round the world." All other teams except Team Fogal Family and Team Brown Family arrived at the school and discovered the sign. Josh Hanlon noticed light switches in the chalk board and flipped them. This caused the main lights to go out and black lights to come on, revealing two hidden messages. One read "Go to the Old Newgate Prison and search the darkness to find the way to the light." The other read "Go to the Wentworth House in Strawberry Banke and find what the Minutemen left behind." All teams present were instructed to pair off, with one team from each pair going to each destination. Messages hidden at each destination would when combined reveal the next destination. As the five teams were departing, Team Fogal Family again called Team Geniuses, who again misdirected them. Team Brown Family arrived at the school shortly thereafter and joined with the other five teams. Team Ex-CIA, Team Southie Boys and Team Wild Hanlons went to Wentworth House and Team Brown Family, Team Miss USA and Team Geniuses went to the prison. Team Wild Hanlons were partnered with Team Brown Family, but when the Browns called the Hanlons for a status update the Hanlons pretended they had bad cell reception, tried to mislead the Browns and finally hung up on them.

Team Air Force realized that the clue was at the school and headed back. They located the two black light clues and called Team Fogal Family. Team Air Force went to Wentworth House and Team Fogal Family went to the prison. As teams arrived at the two destinations, a Motorola message informed them they were searching for hollowed-out bullets with messages hidden inside.

Team Air Force arrived at Wentworth House after the other teams had found the clue and realized that all six remaining teams were allied against them and Team Fogal Family. The Fogals managed to arrive at the prison ahead of the other teams and found their bullet. Combined, the messages, referring to Paul Revere's famous midnight ride read:

Wentworth House	Old New Gate Prison
Near Old North Church	Near Old North Church
Only The Dead	Can See the Light
One if by Land	Two if by Sea
Plymouth	Light if by Land
Boston	Light if by Sea

Teams determined they needed to head for the cemetery at the Old North Church. Once there, they discovered two lanterns in the church steeple, thereby determining that the next destination was Boston Light. Teams raced to Pemberton Pier, from which ferries departed for Boston Light, and grabbed tickets to determine their order of departure the following morning. Ferries left fifteen minutes apart and could accommodate two teams, which gave teams with earlier departure times the option of sharing their ferry with a later team. Team Southie Boys got the first ferry slot, followed by Team Ex-CIA, Team Air Force, Team Wild Hanlons, Team Fogal Family, Team Miss USA, Team Geniuses and Team Brown Family.

The next morning Team Southie Boys departed first, allowing Team Geniuses to go with them. Team Ex-CIA departed next, inviting Team Miss USA along. Team Air Force left third, bringing Team Fogal Family with them. Team Wild Hanlons were next to depart but they refused to allow Team Brown Family to go with them, leaving the Browns in last place by 15 minutes.

As teams arrived at the lighthouse they were informed that seven artifacts were located in ten lockboxes scattered around the island. Team Southie Boys and Team Geniuses noticed rocks laid out in patterns and team members climbed the lighthouse. From above, the rocks formed Roman numerals which revealed the combinations for the two locks on each box. The combinations were IX II LIII, or 9253, and I III IV I, or 1341. The third artifact was an engraved box.

Team Wild Hanlons and Team Brown Family were the last two teams with one artifact left. Team Brown Family solved the Roman numerals but Team Wild Hanlons couldn't figure out the correct value for L. Team Wild Hanlons unsuccessfully attempted to spy on the Browns to get the combination, but ultimately Team Brown Family prevailed.

=== Leg 4 (Massachusetts → New York → South Carolina → Georgia) ===
==== Part One (Massachusetts → New York → South Carolina) ====
Leg 4 sent teams along the Underground Railroad. Teams woke up to find a facsimile copy of a Brooklyn Times newspaper. In the paper was a story written by Walt Whitman, directing teams to the Atlantic Avenue Tunnel in Brooklyn, New York. Team Miss USA was the first in the tunnel, the only entrance to which was a manhole. They found Civil War artifacts and lyrics to the slave song Follow the Drinking Gourd written on the tunnel walls. Among the artifacts were bundles wrapped in cloth, which Team Miss USA discovered but ignored. All other teams as they arrived recognized that the bundles were clues, consisting of a Don't Tread On Me flag, a copy of the Drinking Gourd lyrics and special glasses. The glasses revealed the words BENEVENTUM and GEORGETOWN SC in secret printing on the flag. The next destination was Beneventum Plantation in Georgetown, where the "Don't Tread On Me" flag was created. With the discovery of the destination, teams received a Motorola message that a $30,000 treasure could be claimed by the first team to reach an upcoming location. Team Miss USA realized their mistake in not taking a bundle and returned to the tunnel. Through it all a bluesman performed the song at the tunnel entrance.

After well over a 14-hour trip to arrive at Beneventum, teams located a key and a quilt with a map hidden in the embroidery, like those used by escaping slaves on the Underground Railroad. Combining the symbols on the quilt with the lyrics of the song would lead teams through a swamp to several locked boxes. Each box bore a symbol from the quilt map and contained the key for the next box and teams had to locate the boxes in order.

As teams struggled through the swamp, Team Fogal Family and Team Southie Boys allied but Kayte of Team Fogal Family became hysterical. At the third box (the "old man" box) a twist was thrown at the teams. Teams were given the option of at any time eliminating one of the three team members if they felt that the two-person team would be stronger. From the third box teams had to travel by boat but only two could travel at a time. If teams chose not to cut a member, retrieving that member would cost the team a three-hour delay. A distraught Kayte insisted that her parents leave her behind, but like all other teams who reached that point by the end of the episode, the team stayed together.

Team Ex-CIA claimed the $30,000 treasure in gold coins, which they had to carry with them for the rest of the leg. With the coins was the instruction that the leg would end at the "safe house with the American flag."

Well behind the other teams, Keith Brown fell in the swamp, injuring himself. He had to be removed by ambulance. With teams having the option to cut a player, it appeared that the remaining Brown Family members would be able to continue. At the end of the episode, no teams had completed the leg. Team Geniuses members Charles and Francis were in the boat, still contemplating whether to cut Sam, and Team Brown Family had not yet reached the boats.

==== Part Two (South Carolina → Georgia) ====
Part two picked up where part one left off, with Team Geniuses deciding whether to abandon a team member and Team Brown Family dealing with Keith's injury. Team Geniuses decided to remain together. Team Brown Family was informed that because of Keith's injury they could either quit the Hunt or continue, skipping the swamp but incurring a six-hour penalty. The remaining Browns, after consulting with Keith, chose to continue.

As teams arrived at the "safe house with the American flag," they discovered that the house was filled with quilts and gourds, and the word FREEDOM was written on the wall. Teams searched through the quilts until they found one with a pouch sewn onto it. The pouch contained a quilt panel with the message "I believed that in America most all men loved freedom and would rather go to their grave free than live their life as a slave." Followed by "This warrants some reflection. Dock Street Theatre, Charleston." The letters R, E and D in "FREEDOM" written on the wall were in red. Team Geniuses was the only team to figure out that by donning the red-lensed glasses retrieved from the Atlantic Avenue Tunnel, a star became visible on the quilts holding the message panels.

Team Brown Family was the last to arrive at the safe house and served out the penalty. The team was then advised to go to the theatre without having to locate the quilt panel and were verbally apprised of the reflection portion of the clue.

At the theatre, teams found a number of mirrors hung on the walls. Teams discovered that by breathing on the mirrors, a picture of a flag, a fort and the words FORT PULASKI appeared in the condensation. This led teams to Fort Pulaski National Monument near Savannah, Georgia. At the fort, teams discovered a room displaying a number of variations of the United States flag. Brooke of Team Air Force noticed a plaque that explained how soldiers hid messages in the finials of flag poles. Unscrewing the finials yielded maps of the surrounding area. Following the maps led to the location where the fourth artifact was buried. The artifact was a reproduction of the death mask of a hero of the American Revolution. Although he was not identified by name either to the teams or on-screen, a portrait of the Marquis de La Fayette was shown. Teams were instructed to dig for the artifact, advised that there would be no indication of how deeply it was buried.

All other teams discovered the artifact before Team Brown Family arrived at Fort Pulaski.

=== Leg 5 (Georgia, USA → Paris, France → England: Dover → London) ===
Leg 5 led teams in search of the identity of the man whose death mask they retrieved in Leg 4. From a bed and breakfast in Savannah, teams were instructed to book flights to Paris, France and find the Catacombs of Paris. All teams arrived in Paris together and took the RER B (Paris RER) to the Catacombs. Following the advice of two locals, Team Fogal Family, Team Geniuses and Team Air Force got off the subway five stops before the other teams, at Gare du Nord. Team Southie Boys, Team Ex-CIA and Team Miss USA stayed on the train, which was the correct choice, and got off at Denfert-Rochereau. These three teams arrived at the Catacombs tied for first place.

One member of each team descended into the Catacombs in search of the remains interred in 1789, the year the Marquis de La Fayette designed the tricolor Flag of France. A plaque near the remains read "The Hero Of Two Worlds Awaits upon the RIGHT BANK of the SEINE sword raised. A friend to America. A friend to Washington. Face him to find your fate." This led teams to the "Children's Statue of La Fayette" sculpted by Paul Wayland Bartlett, located at the Cours Albert 1^{er}. Upon their arrival teams were finally apprised by Motorola message of La Fayette's identity and his work as a spy during the American Revolution, and that they are seeking the identity of La Fayette's American contact. Near the statue was a broken replica of the death mask. Teams decided to break their copies of the mask, within which were concealed the true fourth artifacts, a medallion engraved with an unknown ship and the words "Dover Castle The Arrow Points The Way." Teams took a ferry to Dover, England.

Team Southie Boys realized that the arrow referred to a portion of Dover Castle itself. The three lead teams followed the arrow to a cairn of stones which concealed parchment scrolls. The parchments included the words "1725 Samuel Palmer Printing Press London." This led teams to the identity of "America's first spy," Benjamin Franklin, and the location where Franklin apprenticed as a printer, the Church of St Bartholomew-the-Great. Southie Boys, Ex-CIA and Miss USA remained tied for first. Team Geniuses initially broke away in fourth place but Team Fogal Family and Team Air Force passed them at the castle when Kayte figured out the arrow.

The three lead teams arrived at the church together and began searching. Todd of Team Ex-CIA suggested heating the parchment over some of the many burning candles. This caused a message written in invisible ink to appear. The message was a map of the church with the five locations of the fifth artifact, a key, marked. Each of the three lead teams found an artifact.

Team Fogal Family and Team Air Force arrived at the church together but spent so much time searching that Team Geniuses was able to catch up and locate an artifact ahead of them. Team Air Force found the last key, eliminating Team Fogal Family.

=== Leg 6 (Kent, England → France: Nice → Peille/Saint-Tropez → La Turbie → Paris → Normandy) ===
Teams were sent in search of the headquarters of a secret society whose membership included many of America's Founding Fathers. Teams departed from Eastwell Manor in Kent, England for Nice, France, in search of "where Via ferrata ends," which led them to Peille. In Peille, teams were advised that a US$50,000 treasure awaited the first team who located an "inverted rose," symbol of the secret society. To find the next clue, teams were told to search a cave in Peille Gorge, accessible by climbing several rock faces and crossing three suspension bridges. All team members were required to make the climb, but teams were given the option of an alternate route.

Team Air Force, Team Southie Boys, Team Geniuses and Team CIA scaled the cliffs and found a ring of keys and a picture of a castle with the French words Retire la Pierre. This led the teams to Peille Castle. Team Air Force broke away in first place and discovered a scroll hidden behind some loose rocks in the castle wall ("retire la pierre" translates to "remove the rock"). Team Southie Boys, in second place, tried the keys on the castle gate, unsuccessfully, and Team Geniuses and Team Ex-CIA caught up with them. The three teams searched around the castle grounds up to two miles away before returning to the wall and discovering the scroll. The scroll read "The Ancient Roman Ruin crumbles on the hillside in La Turbie."

The alternate route, taken by Team Miss USA, involved driving 150 miles (240 km) to Saint-Tropez and locating a statue of Pierre André de Suffren de Saint Tropez. At the base of the statue was the castle picture with instructions to return to Peille and locate a marked path. From the path the team spotted the castle and located the scroll, managing to pass Southie Boys, Geniuses and Ex-CIA.

At La Turbie (the Trophy of the Alps), Team Air Force, well in first place, spotted a placard on the ground with an "inverted rose." Searching around the area turned up a box with $50,000 in gold coins and a portfolio containing a partial street map of Paris with the Champ de Mars marked. Air Force flew to Paris and headed to the park, and were instructed to climb to the second level of the Eiffel Tower and look West for "a classic symbol of American freedom." They spotted a model of the Statue of Liberty and traveled to it. Near the statue were buckets and a plaque reading "They hid beneath the streets of Paris. Clean the streets of Paris to find your path." Brooke figured out to wash the street map, revealing the name of the secret society, the Rosicrucian Order. Also revealed were the words "To the rose through the cross, to the cross through the rose. In this and everything is a resurgent jewel," along with the name of the Rosicrucian headquarters, the Chateau d'Omonville in Normandy, France.

All the other teams diverged from this path. Team Miss USA arrived at the Eiffel Tower after dark and actually discovered the Statue of Liberty on a souvenir picture postcard. Southie Boys, Geniuses and Ex-CIA discovered the hidden Rosicrucian message on the subway travelling to the Champ de Mars and so were not required to ascend the Eiffel Tower or visit the Statue of Liberty.

At the chateau, the keys teams found earlier at Peille Gorge unlocked a cabinet in which there were locked boxes containing the sixth artifact, a cryptex. Teams Air Force, Geniuses, Ex-CIA and Southie Boys retrieved artifacts. Team Miss USA struggled with the cleaning clue and were eliminated just as they were about to leave for Normandy.

=== Leg 7 (Bronx, NY → Philadelphia, PA) ===
Teams returned to New York City and spent the night at the Waldorf-Astoria Hotel. The next morning, each team received a Susan B. Anthony dollar along with a clue directing them to the Hall of Fame for Great Americans on the campus of Bronx Community College. At the Hall of Fame, teams located a bust of Susan B. Anthony, and by following her gaze, located a bust of La Fayette. Attached to a fence under La Fayette was a mailbox containing keys, labelled "Gould Library," which led teams to the Gould Memorial Library, designed by Stanford White.

In the library, teams received a message that their next clue was hidden in one of the paintings and that "in this case, art imitates life." Team Geniuses discovered a painting called Today, depicting a scene of the Gould Library with a light shining on a particular sculpture. They located the sculpture and found a switch for a spotlight, which caused the sculpture to cast a shadow of a sailing ship. They located a painting featuring the same ship in shadow entitled Sailing to Philadelphia, which was labelled as being owned by the Land Title Building in Philadelphia, Pennsylvania, for which they quickly departed. The other teams discovered the sculpture and painting clues shortly thereafter, and headed to the same location.

At the Land Title Building, teams were advised to send one member to a suite on the 22nd floor in search of the next clue. With one team member headed up, the other two were told that their teammate needed to find a plaque on the ledge outside the 22nd floor. The member on the ledge had to work with the members on the ground in order to find the plaque, which was visible from the ground but not readable. Outside the suite, the team member who went up received a text message reading "Bird of peace holds the code to this door. If your credit had wings you'd find the answer for sure." This lead teams to enter the card security code from the back of the show-provided VISA credit card to unlock the door. Charles from Team Geniuses arrived first and entered the suite. Todd from Team Ex-CIA was second but didn't have his card, so he was delayed until Matt R. from Team Air Force arrived and unlocked the door, admitting John from Team Southie Boys and Todd.

As only one person could go out onto the window ledge at a time, the order was determined by the order they got into the suite. The plaque read "Founders Hall Girard," which all teams other than the Geniuses, who were in the lead, determined correctly to mean Girard College, where Founders Hall is located. Francis of Team Geniuses, who is from Philadelphia, thought that Girard referred to Girard Avenue, and by the time they finally ended up at Girard College, they were in last place. Teams were informed upon arrival that the code to open the cryptex was a seven-letter word, found in multiple locations within the hall, and that some of the rooms have secret entrances. Revealed to the television audience but (apparently) not to the teams was that the solution is hidden in a secret room, but that other items including record books and model ships also contain the solution.

Team Air Force located a shipping record book and after trying the names of a number of the ships, stumbled across the word "LIBERTY" in the book. They dialed the word into their cryptex and it opened, revealing a parchment reading "Library of Congress," which they are advised is the location of the final artifact, as well as a smaller cryptex.

Team Southie Boys arrived at the college second, but twins Martin and Matthew nearly came to blows. John finally defused the situation, and after receiving the Motorola message, they began searching. The team began guessing seven letter words that have to do with Philadelphia, finally getting the right answer (from the Liberty Bell) and advancing to the final round.

Teams Ex-CIA and Geniuses were left to find the answer to the cryptex, and be the last team to move on to the final. While Ex-CIA began dialing in names of model ships and words from posters on the walls, Team Geniuses found the secret room behind a portrait of Stephen Girard and discovered a large model ship named Liberty. Team Ex-CIA found an old street map of Philadelphia and tried street names from it. Finally, each team entered the correct word into their cryptexes, with the Geniuses getting it first to move on. Todd of Team Ex-CIA stated in the season finale that Team Genius's margin of victory was two seconds.

=== Leg 8 (Philadelphia, PA → Washington, D.C. → Baltimore, MD) ===
The three remaining teams spent the night at a bed and breakfast in Philadelphia. In a message, host Laird Macintosh reviewed the artifacts the teams had already collected and informed the home audience that the previous artifact, the cryptex, contained in addition to the parchment a smaller 5-character cryptex. Teams were directed to seek the final artifact at the Library of Congress and advised that they could no longer use their computers. Teams headed to Washington D.C.

Team Southie Boys were first to arrive at the Library of Congress, followed by Team Geniuses and Team Air Force in third. Teams were advised to seek one of three specific books (titled Poltroons & Patriots, Official Histories and The American Flag: Of Stars and Stripes) each of which covered the final artifact. Team Air Force headed for the card catalogue, followed by Team Southie Boys. Team Air Force was the first to find the artifact, a leather-bound book detailing the history of The Star-Spangled Banner. Within the book were semi-transparent maps with chevrons which, when overlaid, marked the various destinations teams had previously visited. The book included a notation that it had been printed on the Library's old printing press and Air Force went in search of the press. In the press room was a template into which the box, key, medallion and compass fit. With the blank map inserted in the press, the artifacts printed a map to Fort McHenry in Baltimore, Maryland. Team Geniuses apparently stumbled onto the artifact largely by chance and printed the map. Team Southie Boys, having temporarily given up on the card catalogue, searched for a while then returned to the catalogue to locate the final book. They too printed the map.

Team Geniuses were the first to arrive at the Fort McHenry docks and hired a boat to take them to the Francis Scott Key Truce Ship. On board and below decks, they located a mounted glass pane with a duplicate map engraved on it. Behind the map was a box containing another map and a token embossed with a star on each side. The map read "The treasure is not here. The answer is right in front of you." There was also a key and the word "Lazaretto" printed on the map. By Motorola message the team was advised to seek the site of Lazaretto Battery. Team Air Force was second at the ship and Team Southie Boys was third.

Back in the boat, Team Geniuses searched the harbor for the battery site. They spotted a factory named "Key Industries" with a duplicate of the Star Spangled banner flag on it and headed there. Upon arrival the team was advised to locate a hidden chamber to find the solution to the second cryptex, and that what was inside would point them to the treasure. Team Geniuses located a hidden entrance inside a pipe and headed down into the chamber. There they located a sliding door with a slot into which the star token would fit. Dropping the token into the slot caused the door to slide open, revealing the "treasure chamber." The walls were covered with hieroglyphs and other symbols and panels were embedded into the floor. The team searched the room for possible solutions to the cryptex.

As the episode came to an end, Team Geniuses were searching the treasure chamber and Team Air Force and Team Southie Boys were still looking for the pipe entrance.

=== Finale (Baltimore, MD) ===
As Team Geniuses continued to try to solve the cryptex, Team Southie Boys discovered the secret door in the pipe. Before they could solve the chamber door, Team Air Force located the pipe door and joined them outside the chamber. Matt R. figured out to drop his team's star token down the slot and all three teams were together in the secret chamber.

Team Air Force noticed that of the symbols on the walls, there was only one star, but were unable to determine its meaning. All three teams continued to search the chamber and try various word combinations on the cryptex. After eight hours, Francis, citing "a vision," tried FSKEY (for Francis Scott Key) and opened the cryptex. Inside was a metal pointer engraved with symbols matching some of those on the large octagonal plates embedded in the floor. Inserting the pointer into the center of one of the plates, Team Geniuses spun the pointer. It landed on the star symbol. Francis punched the star symbol on the wall and was hit in the face with a blast of gas. A panel slid back, revealing a final secret room. Team Geniuses entered the room, discovering a cache of gold coins. Team Geniuses claimed the treasure, valued at $3,000,000.

== Home viewer game ==
- Each episode included a historical trivia question related to the subject matter of the episode. Home viewers answered the question via text message. One winner was selected at random from those who correctly answered and received $10,000.

== Genworth Financial Treasure Challenge ==
- Over 400,000 home viewers competed in an online version of the TV show. After successful completion of each challenge, they were given the opportunity to guess the final location of the online treasure. Out of 37,000 people who correctly guessed the location, 10 were randomly chosen to receive a $10,000 prize and competed in Washington, D.C. in a "mini-hunt" for an additional $100,000 grand prize, which aired August 21, 2006 during the season finale. The grand prize winner was Scott Gray, an environmental scientist from Brandon, MS.

== Public Reception ==
Pre-show reviews seemed optimistic about the fact that Treasure Hunters would be an intense, stepped-up version of The Amazing Race, in the wake of two lackluster seasons the latter show had just aired. It premiered to ratings of approximately 6.9 million viewers on June 18, 2006.

The show's main criticism as it progressed, however, seemed to be that it was just simply too similar in format and style to The Amazing Race. Many were also irked by the stiff, robot-like persona of host Laird Macintosh, who appeared live and in-person to contestants only on two occasions: the premiere and the finale (for the rest of the season, he delivered clues and instructions to teams via video-message on teams' Motorola RAZR cellular phones). The season finale aired on August 21, 2006 to approximately 5 million viewers.

== Genworth Financial "Hints" ==
Along the course of the hunt, Genworth Financial sponsored several messages shown to home viewers and possibly the teams.

- Leg 1 - "Rush to where the treasure stands." This hint was on a road sign on the way to the Mount Rushmore artifact.
- Leg 2 - "Look on water for it is inspiration." This was on the way to Lexington Mine. It was a clue for teams to pour water in the bucket they found in the mine to reveal their next clue, by way of refraction.
- Leg 3 - " " This was located on the Genworth Financial blimp above the Old Burke School. It was meant for teams to turn out the lights in the classroom, which revealed the clue in blacklight. "In dark times, the words form" On a flag in the old burke school
- Leg 4 - "Match the tune with an early drinking song." On the way to Beneventum Plantation teams found this.
- Leg 7 - "Independence for the People" The hint was on the blimp over Founders Hall at Girard College. It was meant to define liberty.
