= Melissa Witek =

American model (born 1981)

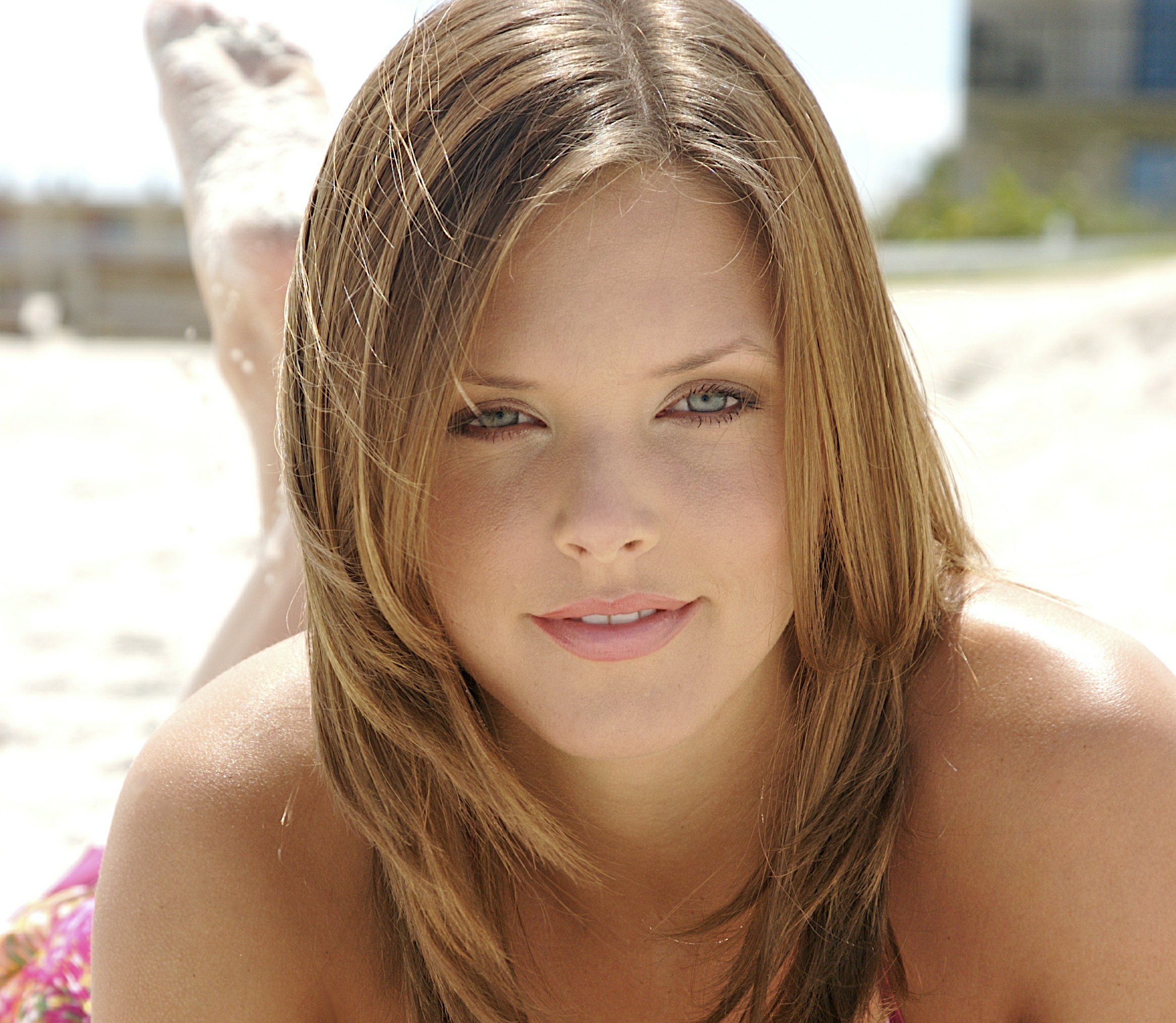
- Born: Melissa Witek; April 9, 1981 (age 45); Rockledge, Florida
- Height: 5 ft 7 in (1.70 m)
- Beauty pageant titleholder
- Title: Miss Florida USA 2005
- Hair color: Brown
- Eye color: Green
- Major competition: Miss USA 2005 (4th runner-up)

Melissa Ann Witek (born April 9, 1981) is an American actress, model, television personality, and beauty queen who competed in the Miss USA pageant and appeared on the reality television show Treasure Hunters.

== Biography ==
Witek was born in Rockledge, Florida. She later moved to Cocoa Beach, Florida, which presented her with the key to the city in August 2004. A sister of Delta Delta Delta sorority, she graduated from the University of Florida College of Journalism and Communications with a degree in Public Relations in 2003, the third consecutive University of Florida alumna to win the Miss Florida USA crown. From 2003 to 2005, Witek was CEO and President of her own builders' supply company, Ampex Granite, which she discussed during her live interview for the Miss USA 2005 pageant.

== Pageantry ==
Witek's first pageant title was Miss Florida Gator which she won in February 2002. With this title, she competed at Miss Florida 2002 (in the Miss America system), but did not place. Her first Miss USA system title was Miss Florida Panhandle USA, which she won in March 2004. In May of that year, she competed against forty-seven other contestants in the Miss Florida USA pageant held in Hollywood, Florida and broadcast live throughout the state. Witek won the crown and numerous other prizes, including cash, a wardrobe and use of an apartment in Hollywood during her reign.

On April 11, 2005, Witek represented Florida in the Miss USA 2005 pageant broadcast live from Baltimore, Maryland on NBC. She placed fourth runner-up to Chelsea Cooley of North Carolina, her state's highest placement since 1987.

== Reality television ==
Months before her state pageant win, Witek had made the semi-finals of reality television show The Bachelor but was cut because of the possibility of her knowing the Bachelor, former University of Florida football star Jesse Palmer. In April 2006 it was announced that Witek was among the cast of the new NBC reality television series Treasure Hunters that aired June 18, 2006. She teamed up with fellow Miss USA 2005 delegates Kristen Johnson of Kentucky and Kaitlyn Christopher of Indiana for the competition, which was taped during September and October 2005. Their group, Team Miss USA, came in as fourth runner-up on the show.

== Notes ==
Preceded by Kristen Berset	Miss Florida USA; 2005	Succeeded by Cristin Duren
