= Lissette Garcia =

American beauty pageant contestant (born 1985)

- Born: May 3, 1985 (age 41); Miami, Florida, U.S.
- Beauty pageant titleholder
- Title: Miss Florida USA 2011
- Hair color: Brown
- Eye color: Brown
- Major competitions: Reina Hispanoamericana 2007 (top 8); Miss Florida USA 2007 (top 15); Nuestra Belleza Latina 2009 (Top 40); Miss Florida USA 2011 (winner); Miss USA 2011 (top 15)

Lissette Garcia (born May 3, 1985) is an American television personality and beauty pageant titleholder from Miami, Florida. She was crowned Miss Florida USA 2011 and was named a finalist for the Miss USA 2011 title.

== Pageant career ==
Garcia won the title of Queen of the World in Germany in 2006. She also competed in the Reina Hispanoamericana 2007 pageant in Santa Cruz, Bolivia, representing Cuba and finishing as a top 8 finalist. In July 2006, Garcia entered the Miss Florida USA 2007 pageant and was a top-fifteen finalist for the statewide title.

In July 2010, Garcia entered the Miss Florida USA pageant as Miss Miami Tropic USA. After competing in talent, interview, and swimsuit categories, she was crowned Miss Florida USA 2011 on July 10, 2010. Her goals as Miss Florida USA included raising awareness of Ovarian Cancer and raising money for the cause. She worked with both the American Cancer Society and the Ovarian Cancer Research Foundation throughout her reign.

In June 2011, Garcia represented Florida in the Miss USA 2011 pageant at the Theatre for the Performing Arts in the Planet Hollywood Resort and Casino on the Las Vegas Strip. During the preliminary competition, Garcia won a hula hoop contest judged by Richard Simmons which earned her a shopping spree and a $1,000 donation in her name to the American Cancer Society. She was a Top 15 finalist for the national crown.

== Broadcast career ==
After her reign as Miss Florida USA, Garcia began working for WPLG-TV, the ABC affiliate in Miami, Florida. She worked as both an associate producer and on-air personality.

In January 2013, Garcia joined the staff of KFOX-TV, the Fox Network affiliate in El Paso, Texas. She worked as an anchor and as the station's on-air traffic reporter. She departed the station to return to Florida in late May 2013.

Garcia worked as an on-air host for WFOR-TV and WBFS-TV, respectively the CBS and MyNetworkTV affiliates in Miami, from June 2013 until June 2014. Garcia left the stations after she and her then-fiancé, WPLG anchor Jason Martinez, announced they were moving to Los Angeles.

== Personal life ==
Lissette Garcia was born in Miami Beach, Florida, and is one of five siblings. As her parents, Miguel and Carla Garcia, were both born in Cuba, she is a first-generation American. She is a 2003 graduate of Southwest Miami Senior High School. She attended Miami Dade College and earned a degree in journalism. Garcia married Jason Martinez on December 13, 2014.

Preceded by Megan Clementi	Miss Florida USA; 2011	Succeeded by Karina Brez
