= Ashley Cariño =

Puerto Rican-American model and beauty pageant titleholder

- Born: Ashley Ann Cariño Barreto; August 3, 1994 (age 32); Fajardo, Puerto Rico
- Education: Valencia College; University of Central Florida
- Occupation: Model
- Height: 1.80 m (5 ft 11 in)
- Beauty pageant titleholder
- Title: Miss Florida USA 2021; Miss Fajardo Universe 2022; Miss Universe Puerto Rico 2022
- Major competitions: Miss USA 2021 (2nd Runner-Up); Miss Universe Puerto Rico 2022 (Winner); Miss Universe 2022 (Top 5)

Ashley Ann Barreto Cariño (born August 3, 1994), professionally known as Ashley Cariño, is a Puerto Rican model and beauty pageant titleholder who was crowned Miss Universe Puerto Rico 2022. Cariño was the second Afro-Puerto Rican to win the title. She represented Puerto Rico at Miss Universe 2022, placing at the Top 5. Previously, Cariño was crowned Miss Florida USA 2021 and placed as the second runner-up at Miss USA 2021.

== Early life and education ==
Cariño was born in Fajardo, Puerto Rico to parents José Barreto and Olga Cariño, as the eldest of five children, and later moved with her family to Kissimmee, Florida when she was five years old. Her mother had previously competed in pageantry in Puerto Rico. Cariño attended the Professional and Technical High School in Kissimmee, graduating in 2012, where she received certification to work as a psychosocial rehabilitator, specializing in working with children with cognitive diversity. She had been inspired to pursue psychosocial rehabilitation after having overcome childhood attention deficit hyperactivity disorder (ADHD) herself.

Cariño later enrolled in Valencia College in Orlando, Florida, and afterwards transferred to the University of Central Florida, studying aerospace engineering. Prior to competing in Miss USA 2021, Cariño had hoped to work for NASA after graduating.

== Pageantry ==
In 2021, Cariño began her pageantry career after registering as a contestant in Miss Florida USA 2021, her first pageant ever. She was inspired to take part after encouragement from her family, and competed alongside her sister Joyce Barreto. Representing South Kissimmee, Cariño went on to win the title in July 2021, becoming the first woman from Kissimmee to be crowned Miss Florida USA.

As Miss Florida USA, Cariño was qualified to compete in Miss USA 2021. The final of Miss USA was held on November 29, 2021, in Tulsa, Oklahoma, where Cariño went on to place as the second runner-up, behind winner Elle Smith of Kentucky and first runner-up Caitlyn Vogel of North Dakota. This was only the third time that Florida had placed in the top three of the competition since Miss USA 1980. Cariño later completed her reign as Miss Florida USA after crowning Taylor Fulford as her successor in May 2022.

=== Miss Universe Puerto Rico ===
After completing her reign as Miss Florida USA, Cariño moved back to Puerto Rico in order to claim eligibility for the upcoming Miss Universe Puerto Rico 2022. In June 2022, Cariño was announced as one of the 28 finalists set to compete in the competition, representing the municipality of Fajardo.

The final was later held on August 11 in Santurce, San Juan. Cariño advanced from the initial pool of 28 finalists into the top fifteen, top ten, and top five, before ultimately being crowned the winner of the competition. With her win, she became the second Afro-Puerto Rican to be crowned Miss Universe Puerto Rico, following her predecessor Michelle Colón. As Miss Universe Puerto Rico, Cariño represented Puerto Rico at Miss Universe 2022, and placed among the Top 5.

Awards and achievements
| Preceded by (Colombia) Valeria Ayos (Philippines) Beatrice Gomez (Top 5) | Miss Universe Top 5 Finalist (with (Curaçao) Gabriëla Dos Santos); 2022 | Succeeded by (Colombia) Camila Avella (Puerto Rico) Karla Guilfú (Top 5) |
| Preceded by Michelle Colón | Miss Universe Puerto Rico; 2022 | Succeeded by Karla Guilfú |
| Preceded by Janice Jimenez | Miss Fajardo Universe; 2022 | Succeeded by Camila Molina |
| Preceded by Monique Evans | Miss Florida USA; 2021 | Succeeded by Taylor Fulford |
