= Julie Donaldson =

American sportscaster and former model (born 1978)

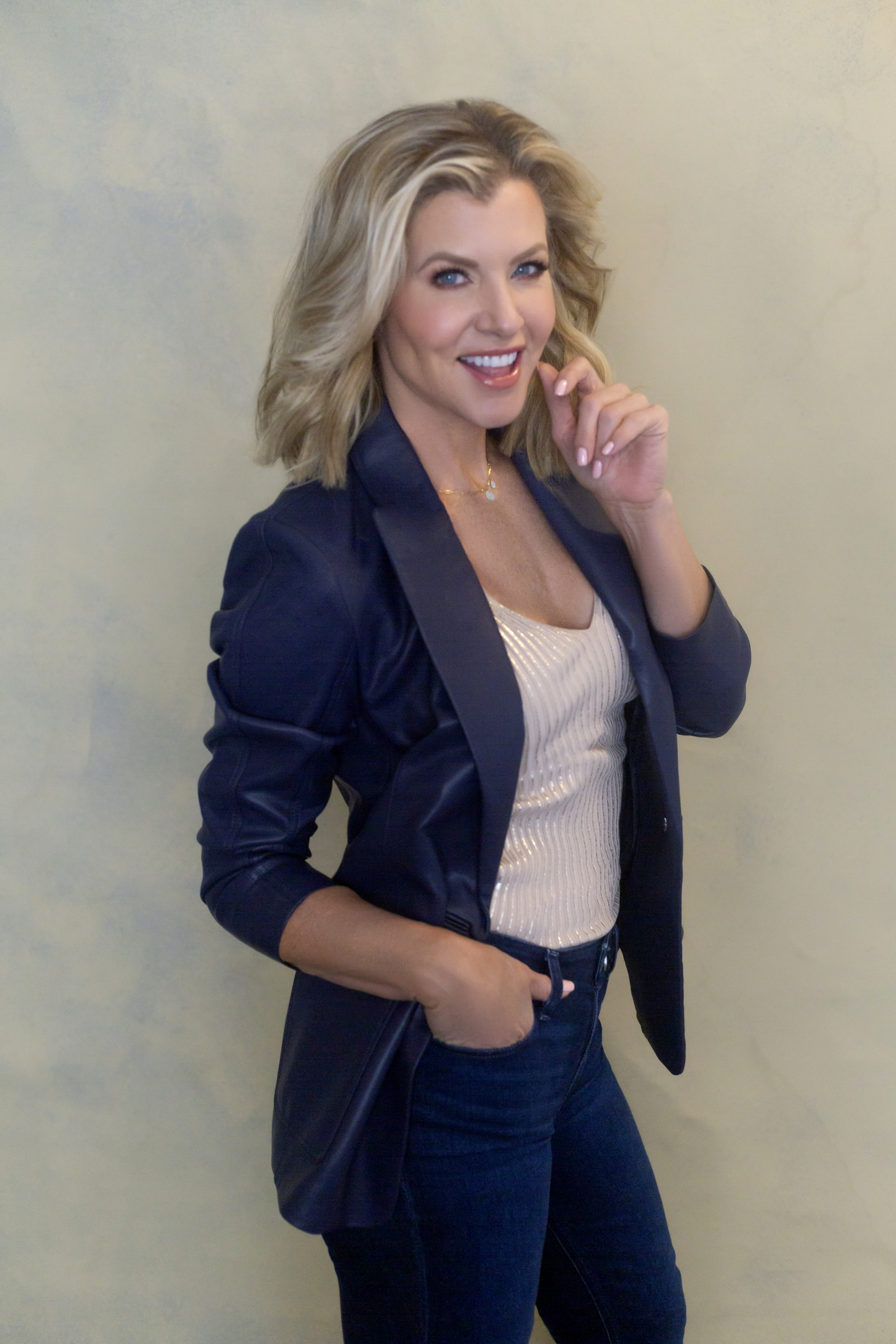
- Donaldson in 2023
- Born: February 10, 1978 (age 48); Jacksonville, Florida, U.S.
- Education: University of Florida
- Occupations: Sportscaster; television anchor; host; reporter; producer
- Employer: WTTG
- Term: 2023–present

Julie Anne Donaldson (born February 10, 1978) is an American sportscaster and former beauty pageant participant. She won the 2001 Miss Florida USA pageant before becoming an anchor and reporter for several television networks. Donaldson was the also first female broadcast member of an NFL team, working for the Washington Commanders from 2020 to 2022.

== Career ==
Donaldson was born on February 10, 1978, in Jacksonville, Florida. She won the Miss Florida USA title at the state pageant held in Orlando, Florida in July 2000. She had previously placed first runner-up to Kristin Ludecke in the previous year's pageant. Donaldson competed in the Miss USA 2001 pageant but did not place.

In 2006, Donaldson joined SportsNet New York at the network's inception. She made numerous reports from various sporting events covered by SNY and hosted Mets Weekly, a weekly program recapping New York Mets games, trades, injuries, and other features. She spent two years working for the network from 2006-2007. Donaldson worked as a TV host for Miami Heat's Heat TV. Prior to that, Donaldson co-hosted Sports Rap on Fox Sports Net Florida. Donaldson also co-hosted Softball 360 and the PBS series Healthy Body Healthy Mind.

In February 2008, Donaldson was hired to cover Boston-based sports for NBC affiliate WHDH-TV. She left the job in December 2008, seeking a start in a new market. In June 2010, Donaldson was employed as a freelance reporter for Comcast SportsNet's mid-atlantic network, covering sports stories in the Washington, D.C. area. Donaldson was promoted to anchor in September 2010. During her decade-long tenure as a reporter, anchor, and host for NBC Sports Washington, Donaldson covered nearly every team, athlete and major sports story in the region, as well as across national and international sporting events. She also served as host of several NFL shows and contributed regularly to their other football programs and coverage. In addition to her work with NBC Sports, Donaldson also held on-air roles for NBC Olympic broadcasts. She held four Olympic assignments as a news host during the Olympic Games in the 2010s.

In July 2020, Donaldson was hired as the Washington Commanders' senior vice president of media and content, which included working as a host for the radio broadcast crew alongside play by play announcer Bram Weinstein and analyst London Fletcher. She was the first full-time female member of an NFL broadcast team and was named as one of the most influential women in sports by Sports Illustrated later that year. Donaldson's contract was not renewed in 2023, with her joining WTTG (Fox 5) in Washington D.C. later that year.

Preceded by Kristin Ludecke	Miss Florida USA; 2001	Succeeded by Shannon Ford
