= Pedro Saúl Pérez =

Dominican Republic activist

Pedro Saúl Pérez (c. 1953 – October 1, 2007) was a Dominican advocate for the rights of Dominican immigrants and migrants in Puerto Rico. Pérez was the founder and president of the Dominican Committee for Human Rights of Puerto Rico.

A legal resident of Puerto Rico for almost 40 years, Pedro Saúl Pérez earned a living as a taxi driver, but spent his remaining time speaking out for the rights of Dominicans living in Puerto Rico. Many Dominican residents of the island complain about persistent discrimination from the Puerto Rican majority. One of Pérez's greatest legal victories was his ability to convince Dominican authorities to investigate the death of a Dominican illegal immigrant who died during a Puerto Rican police raid in the 1990s. Pérez was also a leader in opposing a proposed tax on remittances sent to the Dominican Republic by Dominican residents on the island. The proposal was ultimately defeated.

Pedro Saúl Pérez was 54 years old when he died of an apparent heart attack while walking on a street in Puerto Rico's capital city, San Juan. His remains were repatriated for burial at Cristo Salvador Cemetery in Santo Domingo, Dominican Republic, accompanied by his wife and daughter, in the Dominican Republic.

== See also ==
- Dominican immigration to Puerto Rico
