= Michelle Colón =

Puerto Rican model and beauty queen

- Born: Michelle Marie Colón Ramírez; September 1, 2000 (age 26); Bayamón, Puerto Rico
- Occupation: Model
- Height: 1.83 m (6 ft 0 in)
- Beauty pageant titleholder
- Title: Miss Teen Americas 2018; Miss Loíza Universe 2021; Miss Universe Puerto Rico 2021
- Hair color: Dark brown
- Eye color: Brown
- Major competitions: Miss Universe Puerto Rico 2021 (Winner); Miss Universe 2021 (Top 10)

Michelle Marie Colón Ramírez (born September 1, 2000) is a Puerto Rican model and beauty pageant titleholder who was crowned Miss Universe Puerto Rico 2021 and represented Puerto Rico at Miss Universe 2021 where she finished in the Top 10. She is the first Afro-Puerto Rican to win the national title.

== Early life and education ==
Colón was born on September 1, 2000, in Bayamón, Puerto Rico to a Puerto Rican father and a Dominican mother. She has two half sisters and a half brother from her father's side. Her maternal great-grandfather Rodolfo Cohn was of Ashkenazi Jewish descent and immigrated to the Dominican Republic after surviving the Holocaust.

== Pageantry ==
Colón was named Miss Teen Puerto Rico 2018 and later went on to win the title of Miss Teen Americas.

In 2020, she entered the casting of Miss Universe Puerto Rico 2020, however, due to the COVID-19 pandemic, the pageant was cancelled and the 2019 edition first Runner-Up Estefanía Soto was designated to represented Puerto Rico at the 2020 Miss Universe pageant as a result. Colón later competed at Miss Universe Puerto Rico 2021, where she became the first representative from Loíza to win the title.

She represented Puerto Rico at Miss Universe 2021 which was held on December 13, 2021, at Universe Dome in Eilat, Israel. She is the first woman of predominantly African heritage to represent the island at Miss Universe. Colón placed in the semifinals, ultimately finishing in the Top 10. This was the first time Puerto Rico placed four consecutive years, effectively ending the island's "three placement curse" at Miss Universe. The winner was Harnaaz Sandhu of India.

Awards and achievements
Preceded by Estefanía Soto (San Sebastián)	Miss Universe Puerto Rico; 2021	Succeeded by Ashley Cariño (Fajardo)
Preceded by Dorayma Mercado	Miss Loíza Universe; 2021	Incumbent
Preceded by (Puerto Rico) Patricia Isabel	Miss Teen Americas; 2018	Succeeded by (Dominican Republic) Camila Jiménez
