= Miss Universe Puerto Rico 2019 =

Beauty pageant edition

- Date: June 13, 2019
- Venue: Luis A. Ferré Fine Arts Center, San Juan, Puerto Rico
- Broadcaster: WAPA-TV
- Entrants: 28
- Placements: 16
- Withdrawals: Arroyo; Cataño; Ciales; Fajardo; Guayama; Mayagüez; Naranjito; Orocovis; Ponce; Quebradillas; Rincón; Río Grande; Vieques; Yabucoa
- Returns: Caguas; Camuy; Carolina; Cayey; Culebra; Gurabo; Loíza; Morovis; Peñuelas; Salinas; San Sebastián; Toa Alta; Villalba
- Winner: Madison Anderson; Toa Baja

Miss Universe Puerto Rico 2019 was the 64th Miss Universe Puerto Rico pageant, held at the Luis A. Ferré Fine Arts Center in San Juan, Puerto Rico, on June 13, 2019.

Kiara Ortega of Rincón crowned Madison Anderson of Toa Baja at the end of the event. Anderson represented Puerto Rico at the Miss Universe 2019 pageant and finished as 1st Runner-Up. Due to the COVID-19 pandemic the 2020 edition of the national pageant was cancelled, resulting in 1st Runner-Up Estefanía Soto of San Sebastián representing Puerto Rico at Miss Universe 2020 where she finished in the Top 10.

== Result ==
=== Placements ===
Placement	Contestant
Miss Universe Puerto Rico 2019	Toa Baja – Madison Sara Anderson Berríos
1st Runner-Up (Miss Universe Puerto Rico 2020)	San Sebastián – Estefanía Soto Torres
2nd Runner-Up (Miss Grand Puerto Rico 2020)	Camuy – Fabiola Valentín
Top 6	Carolina – Tanya Romero; Cayey – Verónica Montano **; Dorado – Rebeca Valentín
Top 10	Loíza – Dorayma Mercado; Morovis – Hazel Ortíz; Toa Alta – Ivana Irizarry; Villalba – Vivianie Díaz (Miss Grand Puerto Rico 2021)
Top 16	Aguada – Naomi López *; Arecibo – Sarahí Figueroa; Bayamón – Laihany Pontón; Lares – Auda López; Peñuelas – Melanie Rivera; Salinas – Virnalís Santiago

* - Voted into the Top 16 via online voting

** - Voted into the Top 6 via Twitter voting

== Special awards ==
Special awards	Winne
L'Oréal Mujer De Valor	Villalba - Vivianie Díaz
L'Oréal Beautiful Hair	Arecibo - Sarahí Figueroa
L'Oréal Beautiful Skin	Dorado - Rebeca Valentín
West NY Fashion Week Best Runway	Toa Baja - Madison Anderson
B.lt Salon Total Look Award	Villalba - Vivianie Díaz
Miss Photogenic	Hatillo - Zorelys Lisboa
Miss Congeniality	Culebra - Bianka Torres

== Contestants ==
28 candidates of Miss Universe Puerto Rico 2019:

Represents	Candidates	Age	Height	Placements
Aguada	Naomi López	20	5 ft 8 in (1.73 m)	Top 16
Aguadilla	Shaleyka Vélez	25	5 ft 9.5 in (1.77 m)	
Añasco	Nathalie López	18	5 ft 7 in (1.70 m)	
Arecibo	Sarahí Figueroa	21	5 ft 8 in (1.73 m)	Top 16
Bayamón	Laihany Pontón	21	5 ft 9.5 in (1.77 m)	Top 16
Caguas	Julieth Antongiorgi	23	5 ft 10 in (1.78 m)	
Camuy	Fabiola Valentín	19	5 ft 10.5 in (1.79 m)	2nd Runner-up
Canóvanas	Jeandra Ventura	23	5 ft 7 in (1.70 m)	
Carolina	Tanya Romero	26	5 ft 10 in (1.78 m)	Top 6
Cayey	Verónica Montano	25	5 ft 8.5 in (1.74 m)	Top 6
Corozal	Stephanie Colón	18	5 ft 10 in (1.78 m)	
Culebra	Bianka Torres	26	5 ft 7.5 in (1.71 m)	
Dorado	Rebeca Valentín	24	5 ft 10 in (1.78 m)	Top 6
Guaynabo	Nilka López	25	5 ft 7.5 in (1.71 m)	
Gurabo	Adalís Rivera	25	5 ft 9.5 in (1.77 m)	
Hatillo	Zorelys Lisboa	18	5 ft 7 in (1.70 m)	
Lares	Auda López	20	5 ft 8.5 in (1.74 m)	Top 16
Loíza	Dorayma Mercado	26	5 ft 7.5 in (1.71 m)	Top 10
Morovis	Hazel Ortíz	22	5 ft 7 in (1.70 m)	Top 10
Peñuelas	Melanie Rivera	26	5 ft 7 in (1.70 m)	Top 16
Salinas	Virnalís Santiago	23	5 ft 8.5 in (1.74 m)	Top 16
San Juan	Adriana Collazo	24	5 ft 9 in (1.75 m)	
San Sebastián	Estefanía Soto	26	5 ft 11 in (1.80 m)	1st Runner-up (Miss Universe Puerto Rico 2020)
Toa Alta	Ivana Irizarry	25	5 ft 11.5 in (1.82 m)	Top 10
Toa Baja	Madison Sara Anderson	23	5 ft 10 in (1.78 m)	Miss Universe Puerto Rico 2019
Trujillo Alto	Raixa Nati González	24	5 ft 8.5 in (1.74 m)	
Vega Baja	Glorymar Negrón	25	5 ft 10 in (1.78 m)	
Villalba	Vivianie Díaz	20	5 ft 7 in (1.70 m)	Top 10

== See also ==
- Miss Universe Puerto Rico

Preceded by {{{before}}}	Miss Universe Puerto Rico; 2019	Succeeded by 2021
