= Madison Anderson =

Puerto Rican-American model and beauty queen

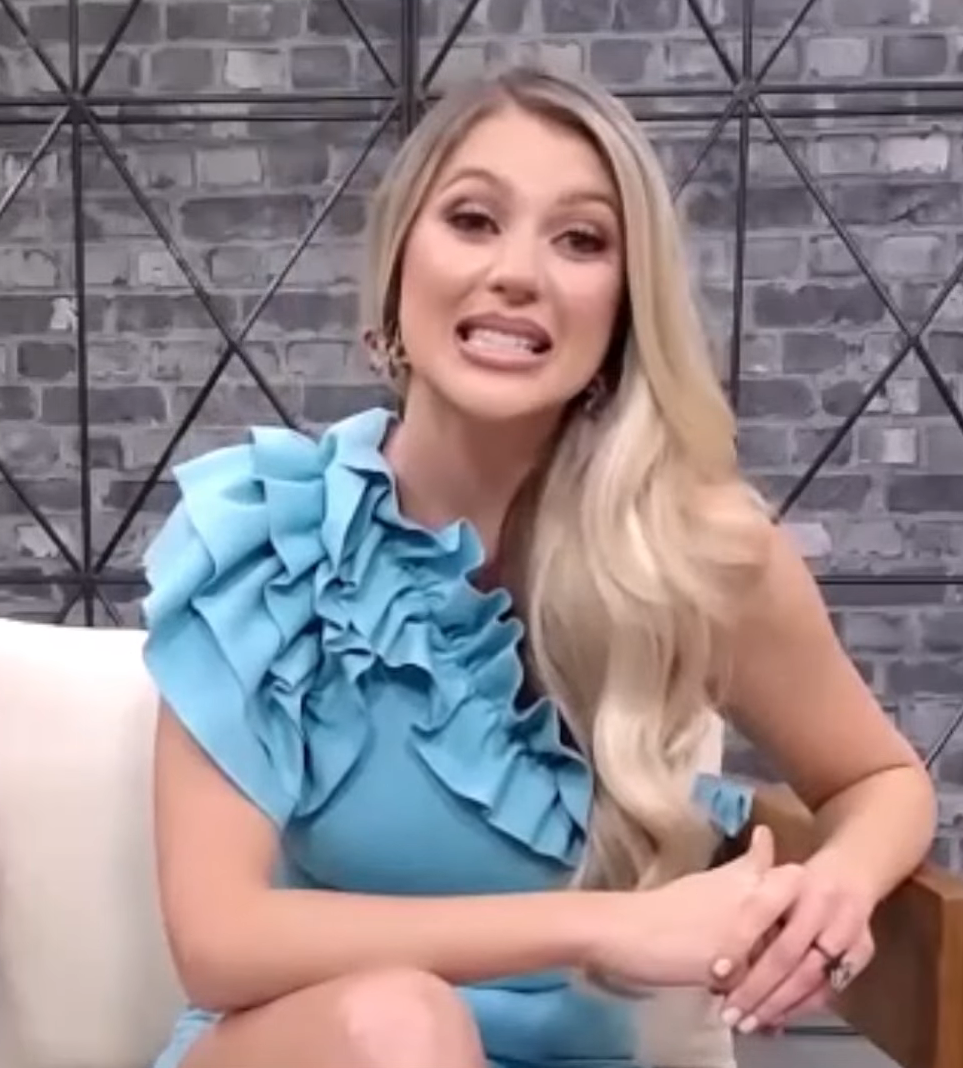
- Born: Madison Sara Anderson Berríos; November 10, 1995 (age 30); Phoenix, Arizona, U.S.
- Education: Fashion Institute of Technology
- Height: 1.78 m (5 ft 10 in)
- Beauty pageant titleholder
- Title: Miss Grand Puerto Rico 2016; Miss Universe Puerto Rico 2019
- Hair color: Blonde
- Eye color: Green
- Major competitions: Miss Grand International 2016; (3rd Runner-Up); Miss Universe Puerto Rico 2019; (Winner); Miss Universe 2019; (1st Runner-Up)

Madison Sara Anderson Berríos (born November 10, 1995) is a Puerto Rican-American model and beauty pageant titleholder who was crowned Miss Universe Puerto Rico 2019. She represented Puerto Rico at Miss Universe 2019 competition where she finished as the 1st Runner-Up. In 2023 she was the winner of the season 3 of La Casa de los Famosos.

== Early life ==
Anderson was born on November 10, 1995, in Phoenix, Arizona, to an American father, Adam Anderson, and a Puerto Rican mother, Belinda Berríos. She relocated with her family to Orlando, Florida, when she was three months old, and later graduated from Dr. Phillips High School. After graduating from high school, Anderson began studying fashion design and textiles at the Fashion Institute of Technology in New York City; she has since begun studying marketing and public relations. Anderson previously worked in Saint Kitts and Nevis, helping women who were domestic violence victims.

== Pageantry ==
Anderson began her pageantry career as a teenager, placing as the fourth runner-up at Miss Florida Teen USA 2014. Afterwards, she won the right to represent Puerto Rico in the Top Model of the World 2015 competition where she placed as 4th Runner-Up to the eventual winner Elena Kosmina of Ukraine. Afterwards, Anderson was crowned Miss Grand Puerto Rico 2016. As Miss Grand Puerto Rico, Anderson placed as the 3rd Runner-Up in Miss Grand International 2016, behind eventual winner Ariska Putri Pertiwi of Indonesia.

After Miss Grand International, Anderson went on brief hiatus from pageantry until competing in Miss Florida USA 2019. She placed as the 1st Runner-Up behind winner Nicolette Jennings, who went on to place in the top ten of Miss USA 2019. Anderson later entered the Miss Universe Puerto Rico 2019 competition, representing the municipality of Toa Baja. On June 13, 2019, Anderson went on to win the competition, succeeding Kiara Ortega. As Miss Universe Puerto Rico, Anderson won the right to represent Puerto Rico at the Miss Universe 2019 competition where she finished as 1st Runner-Up, becoming the country's highest non-winning placement since Cynthia Olavarría who also finished as 1st Runner-Up at Miss Universe 2005.

Awards and achievements
Preceded by (South Africa) Tamaryn Green	Miss Universe 1st Runner-Up; 2019	Succeeded by (Brazil) Julia Gama
Preceded by Kiara Ortega (Rincón)	Miss Universe Puerto Rico; 2019	Succeeded by Estefanía Soto (San Sebastián)
Preceded by Yolimar Lara	Miss Toa Baja Universe; 2019	Succeeded by Heilymar Rosario Velazquez
