= Miss World Puerto Rico 2021 =

46th edition of the Miss World Puerto Rico pageant

- Date: April 24, 2021
- Presenters: Fernando Allende; Wilnelia Merced Cruz, Lady Forsyth-Johnson; Stephanie Del Valle Díaz
- Entertainment: Maeso; Aden Allende
- Venue: Alejandro Tapia y Rivera Theatre, San Juan, Puerto Rico
- Broadcaster: WLII-DT; YouTube
- Entrants: 17
- Placements: 11
- Withdrawals: Adjuntas; Aguas Buenas; Añasco; Arecibo; Bayamón; Caguas; Carolina; Cayey; Dorado; Guayama; Gurabo; Mayagüez; Morovis; San Lorenzo; Trujillo Alto; Utuado; Vega Alta
- Returns: Camuy; Fajardo; Guayanilla; Guaynabo; Hatillo; Loíza; Rincón; Santa Isabel; Toa Baja
- Winner: Aryam Díaz; Naranjito
- Congeniality: Italy Marie Molina Gómez; Juana Díaz

Miss World Puerto Rico 2021, was the 46th edition of the Miss World Puerto Rico pageant. It was held at the Alejandro Tapia y Rivera Theatre in San Juan, Puerto Rico on April 24, 2021. Aryam Díaz Rosado of Naranjito, was crowned Miss World Puerto Rico 2021 by outgoing titleholder Daniella Rodríguez Laureano of Bayamón. Aryam Díaz Rosado is set to represent Puerto Rico at Miss World 2021 which was held at the Coca-Cola Music Hall in San Juan, Puerto Rico on March 16, 2021.

== Results ==
=== Placements ===
Final results	Contestant
Miss World Puerto Rico 2021	Naranjito - Aryam Mariel Díaz Rosado
1st Runner-Up	San Juan - Bárbara Betancourt Cortés
2nd Runner-Up	Fajardo - Bianka Loriel Torres Espada
3rd Runner-Up	Río Grande - Raishmar Carrillo González
4th Runner-Up	Rincón - Chelsey García Agrón
Top 11	Guaynabo - Amanda Calderón Valero; Hatillo - Paloma Lugardo Toledo; Humacao - Maranela Marti Rivera; Quebradillas - Dayanne Marie Rivera Mercado; Santa Isabel - Andreina Vega Rosa; Vega Baja - Odalys Surey Balasquide Odeh

=== Special awards ===
Award	Contestant
Miss Amistad; Miss Friendship	Juana Díaz - Italy Marie Molina Gómez
Rostro Más Hermoso de Avon (Avon's Most Beautiful Face)	Santa Isabel - Andreina Vega Rosa

=== Challenges ===
==== Beauty With a Purpose ====
Final Result	Candidate
Winner	Río Grande - Raishmar Carrillo González
1st Runner-Up	Rincón - Chelsey García Agrón
2nd Runner-Up	Isabela - Cristina Nicole Nieves Quintero
3rd Runner-Up	Hatillo - Paloma Lugardo Toledo
4th Runner-Up	Humacao - Maranela Marti Rivera

==== Talent ====
Final Result	Candidate
Winner	Quebradillas - Dayanne Marie Rivera Mercado
1st Runner-Up	Río Grande - Raishmar Carrillo González
2nd Runner-Up	
Top 8	Humacao - Maranela Marti Rivera; Vega Baja - Odalys Surey Balasquide Odeh

==== Best Body ====
Final Result	Candidate
Winner	Fajardo - Bianka Loriel Torres Espada
1st Runner-Up	Santa Isabel - Andreina Vega Rosa
2nd Runner-Up	Naranjito - Aryam Mariel Díaz Rosado
3rd Runner-Up	Rincón - Chelsey García Agrón
4th Runner-Up	Juana Díaz - Italy Marie Molina Gómez
5th Runner-Up	San Juan - Bárbara Betancourt Cortés

==== Top Model ====
Final Result	Candidate
Winner	Rincón - Chelsey García Agrón
1st Runner-Up	Naranjito - Aryam Mariel Díaz Rosado
2nd Runner-Up	Santa Isabel - Andreina Vega Rosa
3rd Runner-Up	Humacao - Maranela Marti Rivera
4th Runner-Up	Río Grande - Raishmar Carrillo González

==== Sports ====
Final Result	Candidate
Winner	Santa Isabel - Andreina Vega Rosa
1st Runner-Up	Vega Baja - Odalys Surey Balasquide Odeh
2nd Runner-Up	Río Grande - Raishmar Carrillo González

== Contestants ==
Official 17 candidates of Miss World Puerto Rico 2021:

Represents	Candidates	Age	Placements
Camuy	Kayleann M. Nieves Crespo		
Fajardo	Bianka Loriel Torres Espada		2nd Runner-Up
Guayanilla	Fabiola Maria Torres Santos		
Guaynabo	Amanda Calderón Valero		Top 11
Hatillo	Paloma Lugardo Toledo		Top 11
Humacao	Maranela Marti Rivera		Top 11
Isabela	Cristina Nicole Nieves Quintero		
Juana Díaz	Italy Marie Molina Gómez		
Loíza	Nashaly Michelle Lacen Valdés		
Naranjito	Aryam Mariel Díaz Rosado	22	Miss World Puerto Rico 2021
Quebradillas	Dayanne Marie Rivera Mercado		Top 11
Rincón	Chelsey García Agrón		4th Runner-Up
Río Grande	Raishmar Shakira Nakisha Carrillo González		3rd Runner-Up
San Juan	Bárbara Betancourt Cortés		1st Runner-Up
Santa Isabel	Andreina Vega Rosa		Top 11
Toa Baja	Deyaneira Agosto Collazo		
Vega Baja	Odalys Surey Balasquide Odeh		Top 11
