= Jaguas =

Jaguas may refer to:

== Places ==
- Jaguas, Ciales, Puerto Rico, a barrio
- Jaguas, Guayanilla, Puerto Rico, a barrio
- Jaguas, Gurabo, Puerto Rico, a barrio
- Jaguas, Peñuelas, Puerto Rico, a barrio
