= Consejo (disambiguation) =

Consejo may refer to:

== Places ==
- Consejo, a village in Corozal District, Belize
- Consejo, Guayanilla, Puerto Rico, a barrio
- Consejo, Utuado, Puerto Rico, a barrio
