= Pasto (disambiguation) =

Pasto is the capital of the department of Nariño, in southern Colombia.

Pasto may also refer to:

== Places ==
- Pasto, Aibonito, Puerto Rico
- Pasto, Coamo, Puerto Rico
- Pasto, Guayanilla, Puerto Rico
- Pasto, Morovis, Puerto Rico

== Other uses ==
- Pasto people, an ethnic group of Colombia and Ecuador
- Pasto language, the extinct language associated with them
- Pasto (album), an album by Argentine rock group Babasónicos

== See also ==
- Impasto
- Pasto-1, an Indonesian music group
- Pashto
