= Rufina, Guayanilla, Puerto Rico =

Barrio of Puerto Rico

Rufina
- Barrio
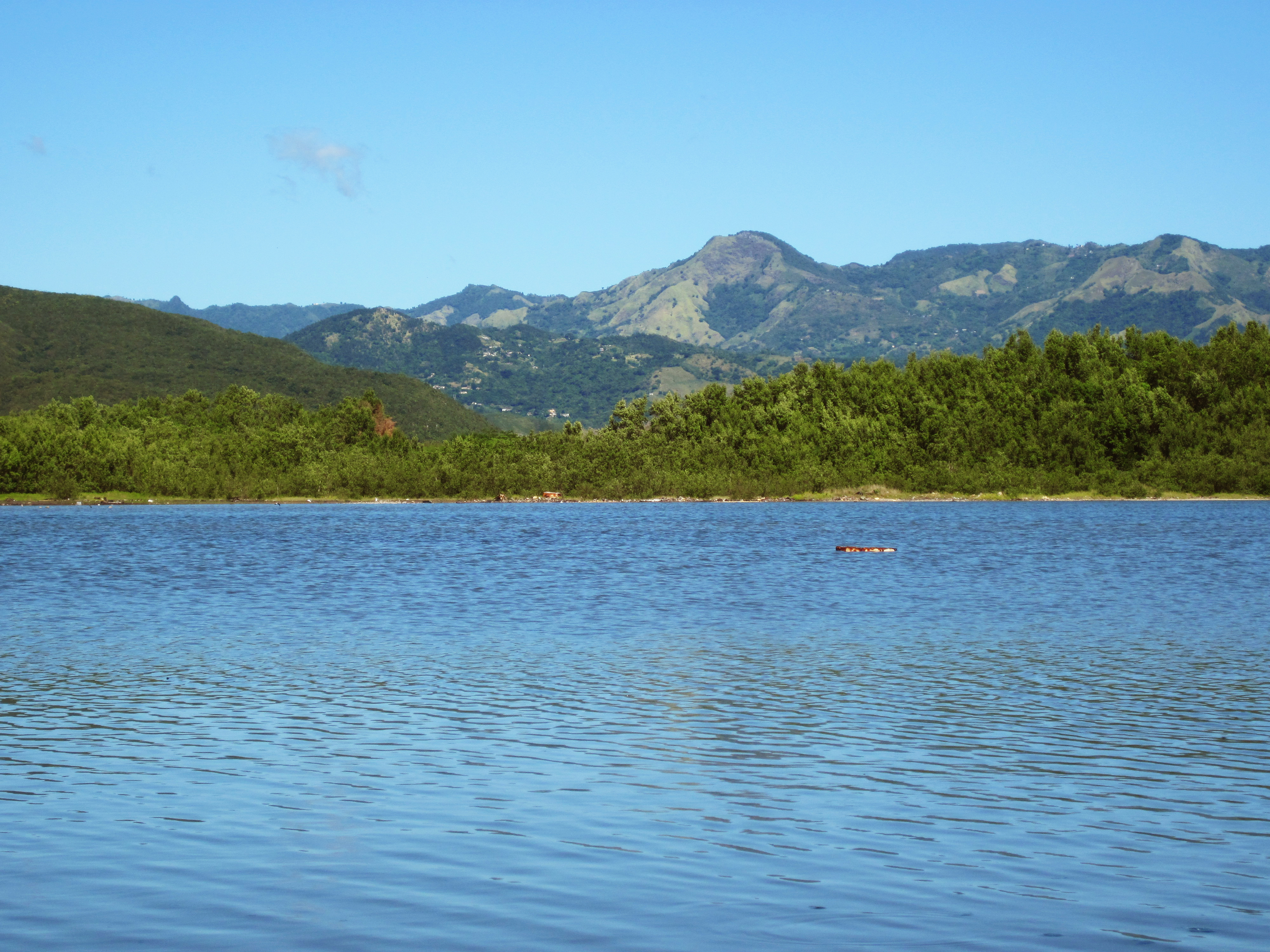
- Guayanilla Bay

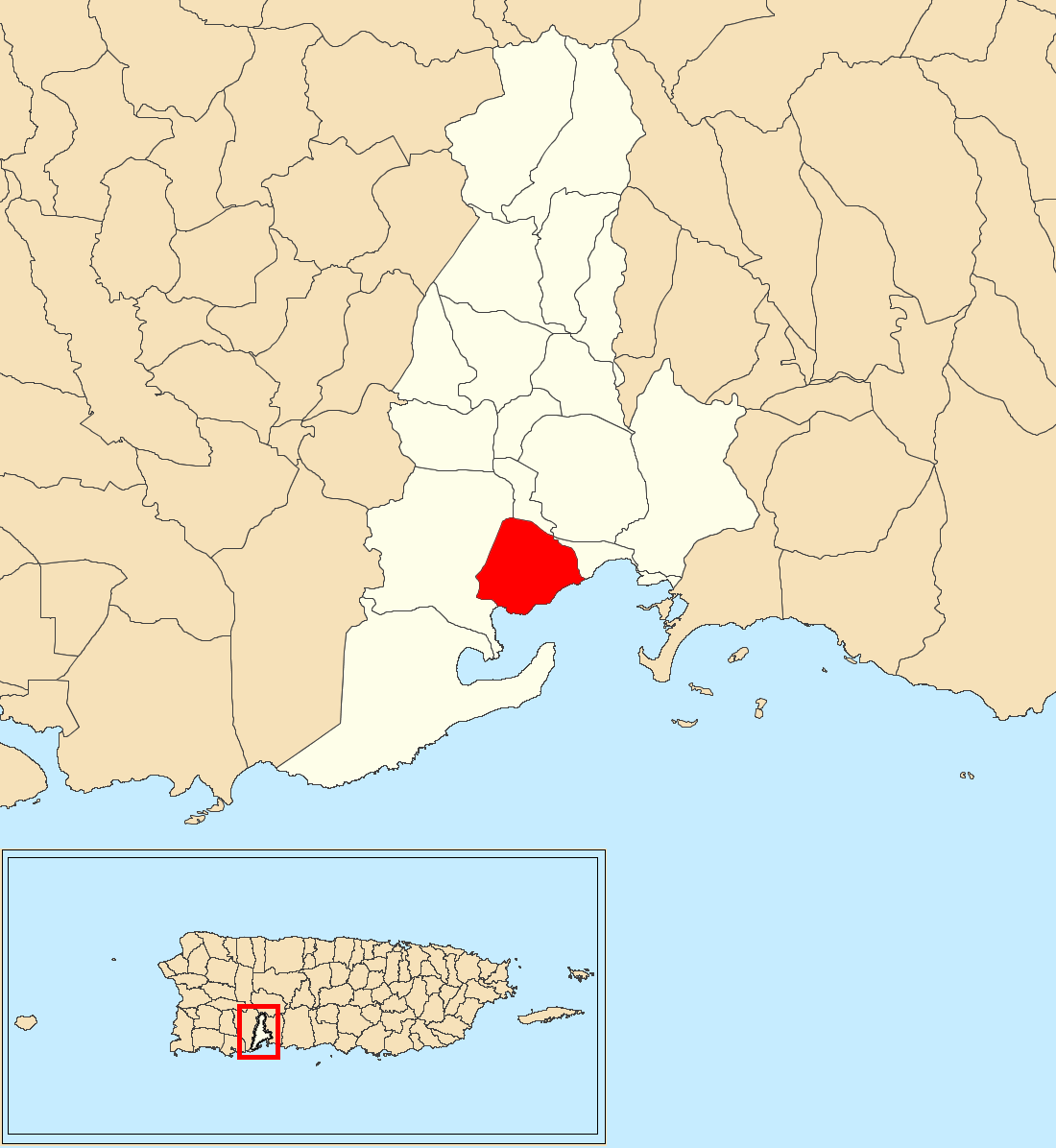
- Location of Rufina within the municipality of Guayanilla shown in red

- Location of Puerto Rico
- Coordinates: 18°00′05″N 66°47′12″W
- Commonwealth: Puerto Rico
- Municipality: Guayanilla
- Established: 1935

Area
  - Total: 2.34 sq mi (6.1 km^{2})
  - Land: 1.81 sq mi (4.7 km^{2})
  - Water: 0.53 sq mi (1.4 km^{2})
- Elevation: 10 ft (3.0 m)

Population (2010)
  - Total: 220
  - Density: 121.5/sq mi (46.9/km^{2})
- Source: 2010 Census
- Time zone: UTC−4 (AST)

Rufina is a rural barrio in the municipality of Guayanilla, Puerto Rico. Its population in 2010 was 220. Rufina was established in 1935 and was made up of parts of Guayanilla barrio-pueblo and Indios barrio in Guayanilla.

== Features and demographics ==
Rufina has 1.81 square miles (4.7 km^{2}) of land area and .53 square miles (1.4 km^{2}) of water area. In 2010, its population was 220 with a population density of 121.5 inhabitants per square mile (46.9/km^{2}).

Historical population
Census	Pop.	Note	%±
1940	1,261		—
1950	799		−36.6%
1960	567		−29.0%
1970	415		−26.8%
1980	232		−44.1%
1990	220		−5.2%
2000	210		−4.5%
2010	220		4.8%
U.S. Decennial Census; 1899 (shown as 1900) 1910-1930; 1930-1950 1980-2000 2010

== See also ==
- List of communities in Puerto Rico
