= Boca, Guayanilla, Puerto Rico =

Barrio of Puerto Rico

Boca
- Barrio
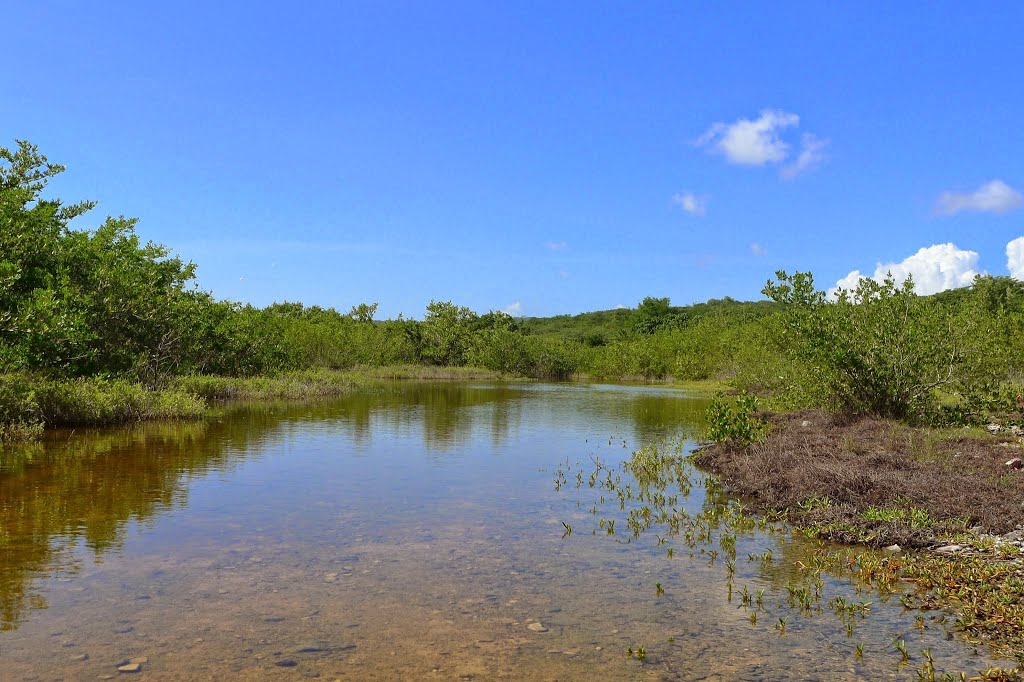
- Guánica State Forest in Boca, the Guayanilla side of the forest

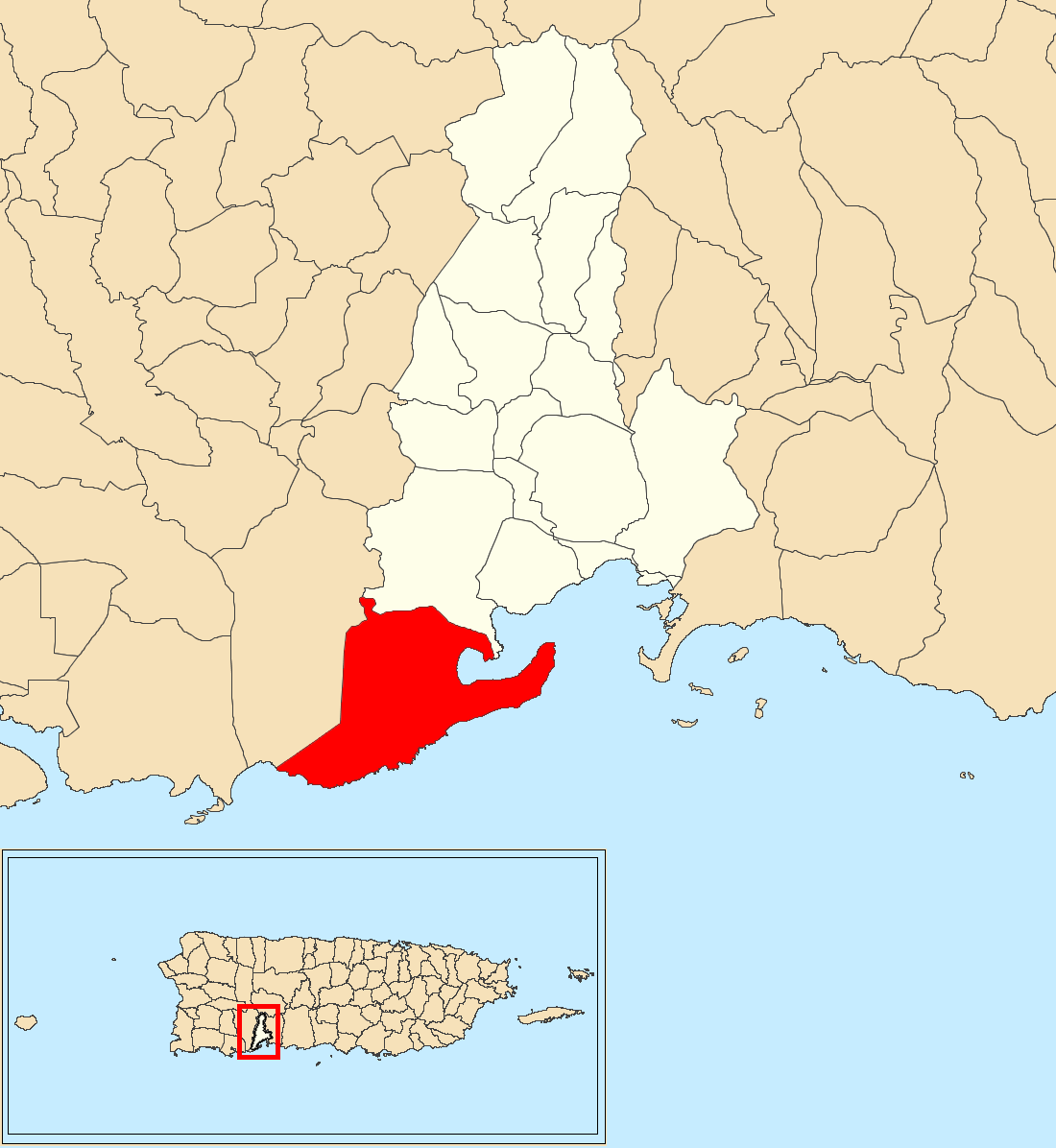
- Location of Boca within the municipality of Guayanilla shown in red

- Location of Puerto Rico
- Coordinates: 17°58′10″N 66°48′49″W
- Commonwealth: Puerto Rico
- Municipality: Guayanilla

Area
  - Total: 9.10 sq mi (23.6 km^{2})
  - Land: 6.39 sq mi (16.6 km^{2})
  - Water: 2.71 sq mi (7.0 km^{2})
- Elevation: 20 ft (6.1 m)

Population (2010)
  - Total: 1,089
  - Density: 170.4/sq mi (65.8/km^{2})
- Source: 2010 Census
- Time zone: UTC−4 (AST)

Boca (Barrio Boca) is a rural barrio in the municipality of Guayanilla, Puerto Rico. Its population in 2010 was 1,089.

== Features and demographics ==
Boca has 6.39 square miles (16.6 km^{2}) of land area and 2.71 square miles (7.0 km^{2}) of water area. In 2010, its population was 1089 with a population density of 170.4 inhabitants per square mile (65.8/km^{2}).

Historical population
Census	Pop.	Note	%±
1910	579		—
1920	637		10.0%
1930	718		12.7%
1940	856		19.2%
1950	681		−20.4%
1960	1,265		85.8%
1970	1,208		−4.5%
1980	1,341		11.0%
1990	1,330		−0.8%
2000	1,263		−5.0%
U.S. Decennial Census; 1900 (N/A) 1910-1930; 1930-1950 1980-2000 2010

== History ==
Boca was in Spain's gazetteers until Puerto Rico was ceded by Spain in the aftermath of the Spanish–American War under the terms of the Treaty of Paris of 1898 and became an unincorporated territory of the United States. In 1899, the United States Department of War conducted a census of Puerto Rico finding that the combined population of Indios barrio and Boca barrio was 782.

== See also ==
- List of communities in Puerto Rico
