= Llano, Guayanilla, Puerto Rico =

Barrio of Puerto Rico

Llano
- Barrio
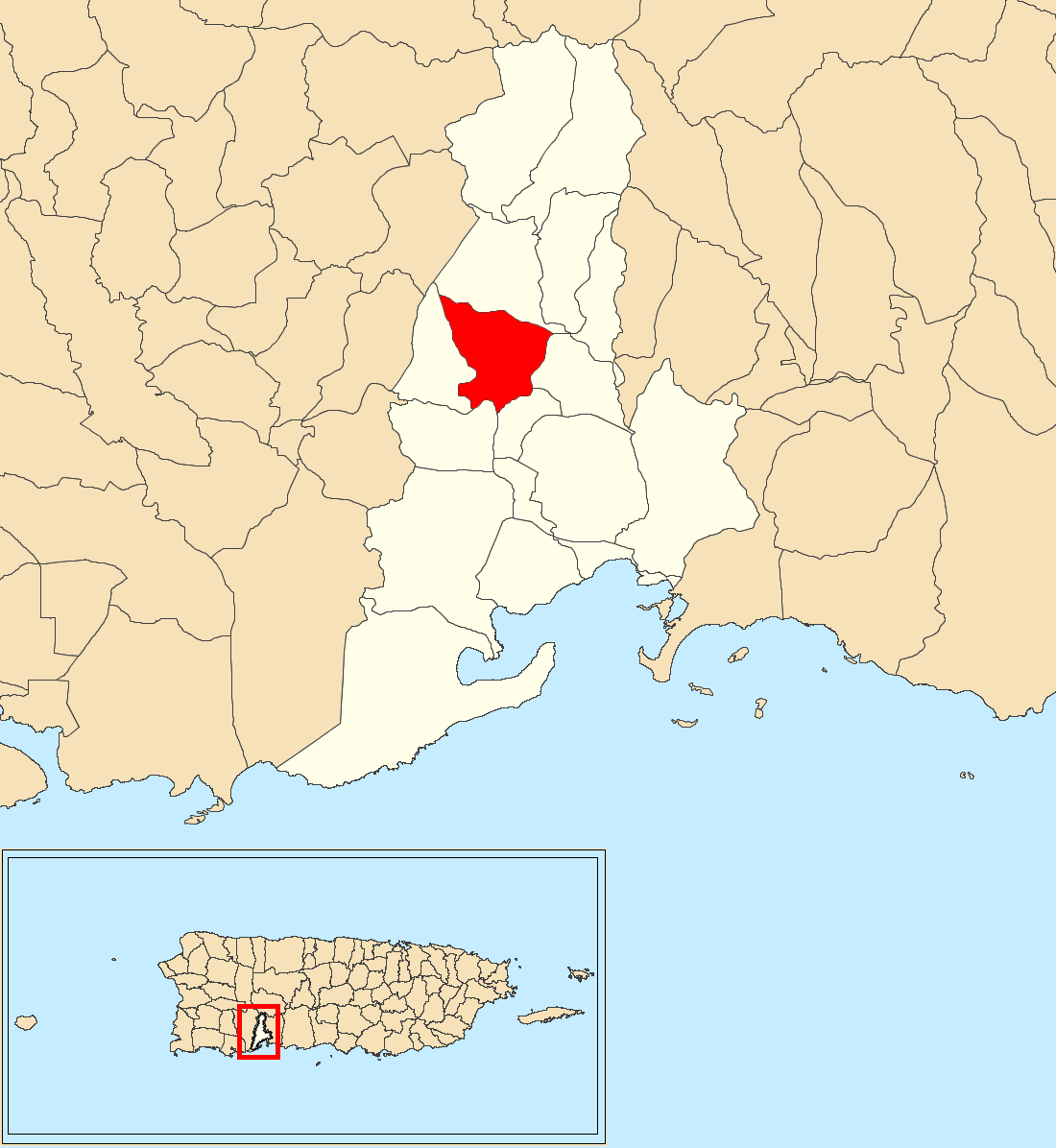
- Location of Llano within the municipality of Guayanilla shown in red

- Location of Puerto Rico
- Coordinates: 18°03′27″N 66°47′53″W
- Commonwealth: Puerto Rico
- Municipality: Guayanilla

Area
  - Total: 1.98 sq mi (5.1 km^{2})
  - Land: 1.98 sq mi (5.1 km^{2})
  - Water: 0 sq mi (0 km^{2})
- Elevation: 276 ft (84 m)

Population (2010)
  - Total: 773
  - Density: 390.4/sq mi (150.7/km^{2})
- Source: 2010 Census
- Time zone: UTC−4 (AST)

Llano is a rural barrio in the municipality of Guayanilla, Puerto Rico. Its population in 2010 was 773.

== Features and demographics ==
Llano has 1.98 square miles (5.1 km^{2}) of land area and no water area. In 2010, its population was 773 with a population density of 390.4 inhabitants per square mile (150.7/km^{2}).

Historical population
Census	Pop.	Note	%±
1910	577		—
1920	686		18.9%
1930	588		−14.3%
1940	640		8.8%
1950	784		22.5%
1960	583		−25.6%
1970	520		−10.8%
1980	529		1.7%
1990	713		34.8%
2000	841		18.0%
2010	773		−8.1%
U.S. Decennial Census; 1900 (N/A) 1910-1930; 1930-1950 1980-2000 2010

== History ==
Llano was in Spain's gazetteers until Puerto Rico was ceded by Spain in the aftermath of the Spanish–American War under the terms of the Treaty of Paris of 1898 and became an unincorporated territory of the United States. In 1899, the United States Department of War conducted a census of Puerto Rico finding that the combined population of Llano and Quebradas barrios was 977.

== See also ==
- List of communities in Puerto Rico
