= Quebradas, Guayanilla, Puerto Rico =

Barrio of Puerto Rico

Quebradas
- Barrio
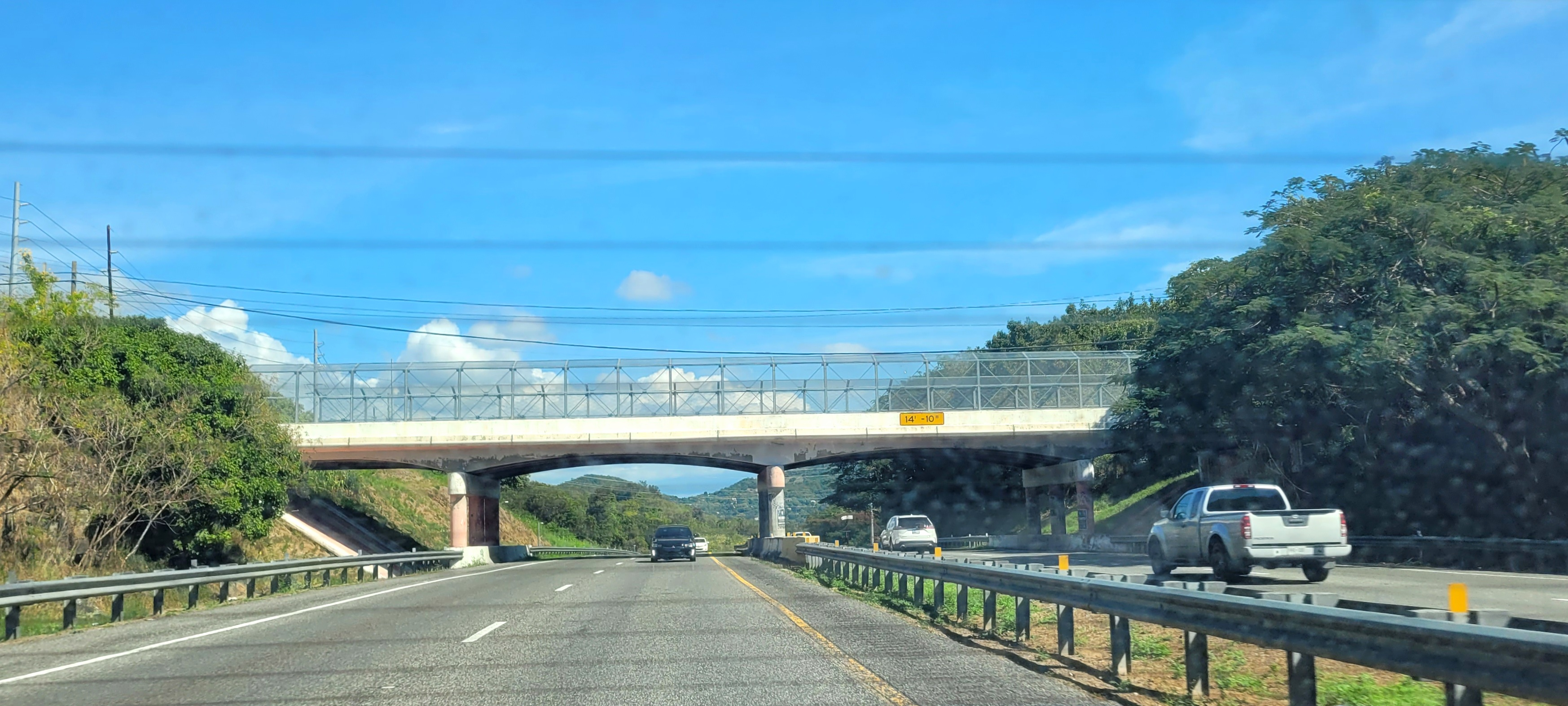
- Puerto Rico Highway 2 in Quebradas

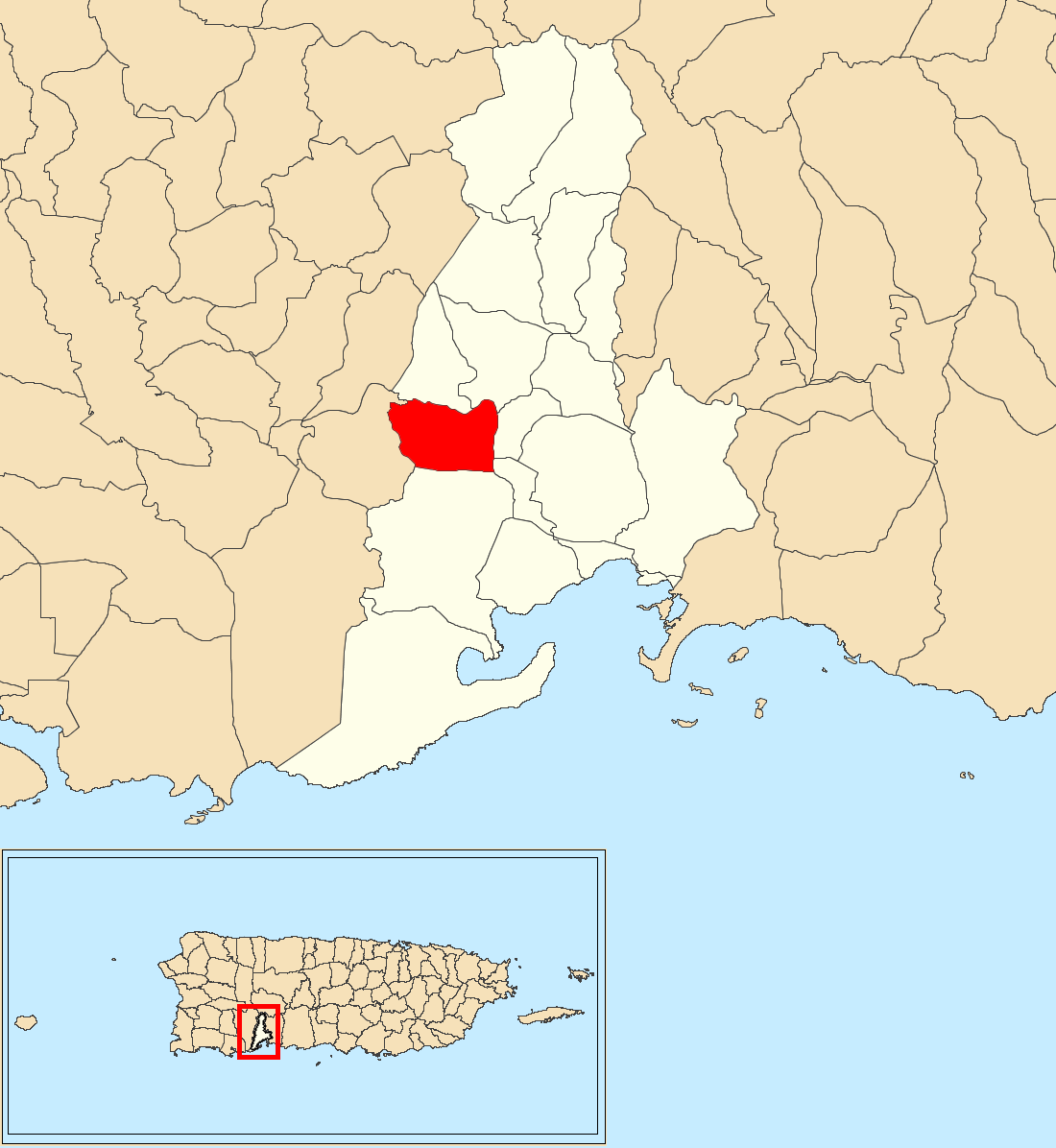
- Location of Quebradas within the municipality of Guayanilla shown in red

- Location of Puerto Rico
- Coordinates: 18°02′14″N 66°48′38″W
- Commonwealth: Puerto Rico
- Municipality: Guayanilla

Area
  - Total: 1.77 sq mi (4.6 km^{2})
  - Land: 1.77 sq mi (4.6 km^{2})
  - Water: 0 sq mi (0 km^{2})
- Elevation: 180 ft (55 m)

Population (2010)
  - Total: 2,425
  - Density: 1,370.1/sq mi (529.0/km^{2})
- Source: 2010 Census
- Time zone: UTC−4 (AST)

Quebradas is a rural barrio in the municipality of Guayanilla, Puerto Rico. Its population in 2010 was 2,425.

== Features and demographics ==
Quebradas has 1.77 square miles (4.6 km^{2}) of land area and no water area. In 2010, its population was 2,425 with a population density of 1,370.1 inhabitants per square mile (529.0/km^{2}).

Historical population
Census	Pop.	Note	%±
1910	563		—
1920	631		12.1%
1930	677		7.3%
1940	774		14.3%
1950	934		20.7%
1960	1,026		9.9%
1970	1,057		3.0%
1980	2,329		120.3%
1990	2,903		24.6%
2000	2,609		−10.1%
2010	2,425		−7.1%
U.S. Decennial Census; 1900 (N/A) 1910-1930; 1930-1950 1980-2000 2010

== History ==
Quebradas was in Spain's gazetteers until Puerto Rico was ceded by Spain in the aftermath of the Spanish–American War under the terms of the Treaty of Paris of 1898 and became an unincorporated territory of the United States. In 1899, the United States Department of War conducted a census of Puerto Rico finding that the combined population of Llano and Quebradas barrios was 977.

== See also ==
- List of communities in Puerto Rico
