= Quebrada Honda, Guayanilla, Puerto Rico =

Barrio of Puerto Rico

Quebrada Honda
- Barrio
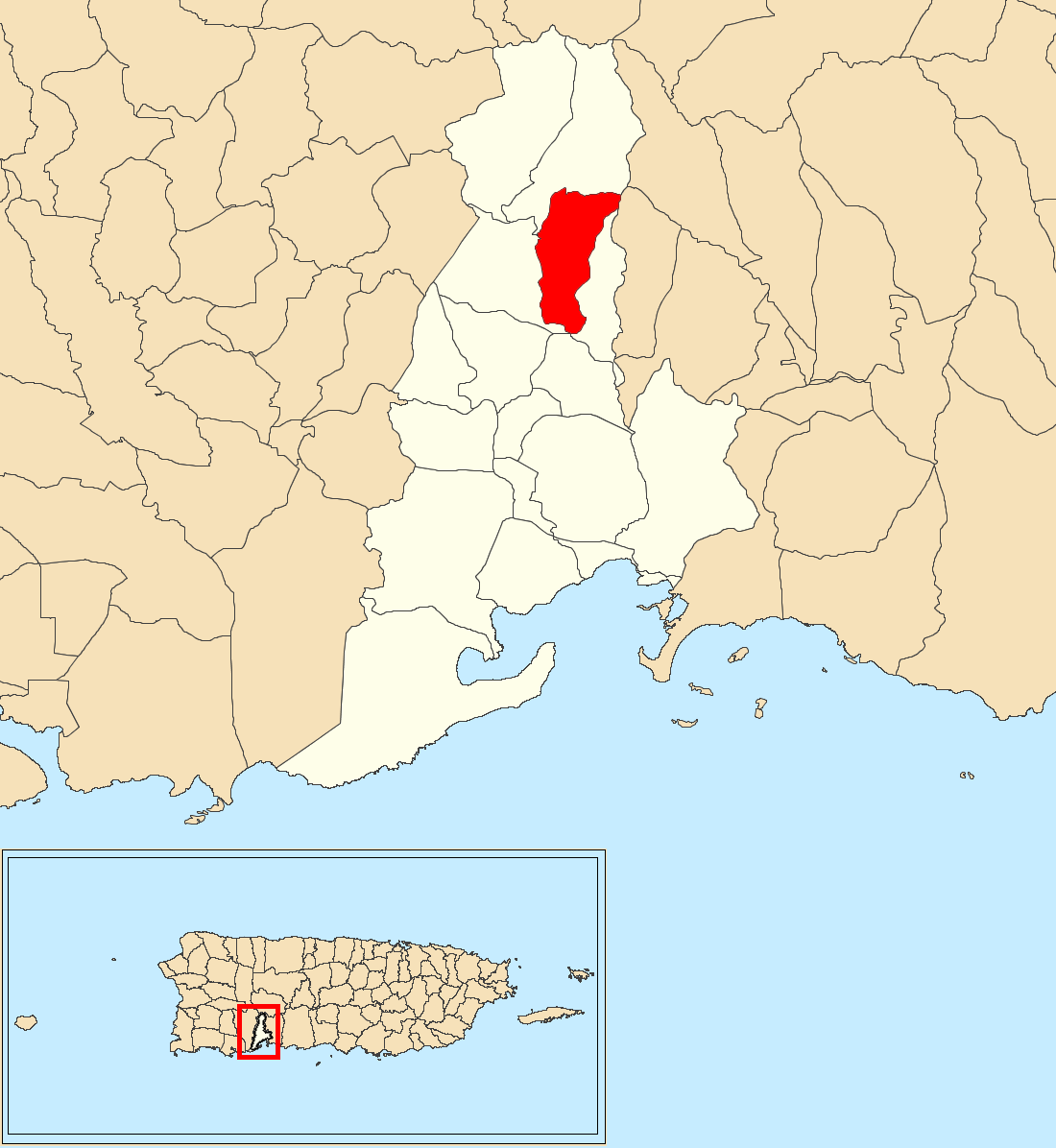
- Location of Quebrada Honda within the municipality of Guayanilla shown in red

- Location of Puerto Rico
- Coordinates: 18°04′57″N 66°46′47″W
- Commonwealth: Puerto Rico
- Municipality: Guayanilla

Area
  - Total: 1.92 sq mi (5.0 km^{2})
  - Land: 1.92 sq mi (5.0 km^{2})
  - Water: 0 sq mi (0 km^{2})
- Elevation: 922 ft (281 m)

Population (2010)
  - Total: 390
  - Density: 203.1/sq mi (78.4/km^{2})
- Source: 2010 Census
- Time zone: UTC−4 (AST)

Quebrada Honda is a rural barrio in the municipality of Guayanilla, Puerto Rico. Its population in 2010 was 390.

== Features and demographics ==
Quebrada Honda has 1.92 square miles (5.0 km^{2}) of land area and no water area. In 2010, its population was 390 with a population density of 203.1 inhabitants per square mile (78.4/km^{2}).

Historical population
Census	Pop.	Note	%±
1910	679		—
1920	811		19.4%
1930	731		−9.9%
1940	668		−8.6%
1950	549		−17.8%
1960	545		−0.7%
1970	387		−29.0%
1980	403		4.1%
1990	458		13.6%
2000	446		−2.6%
2010	390		−12.6%
U.S. Decennial Census; 1900 (N/A) 1910-1930; 1930-1950 1980-2000 2010

== History ==
Quebrada Honda was in Spain's gazetteers until Puerto Rico was ceded by Spain in the aftermath of the Spanish–American War under the terms of the Treaty of Paris of 1898 and became an unincorporated territory of the United States. In 1899, the United States Department of War conducted a census of Puerto Rico finding that the combined population of Quebrada Honda and Jagua Pasto barrios was 1,467.

== See also ==
- List of communities in Puerto Rico
