= Guayanilla, Puerto Rico =

Town and municipality in Puerto Rico

Guayanilla Municipio Autónomo de Guayanilla
- Town and Municipality
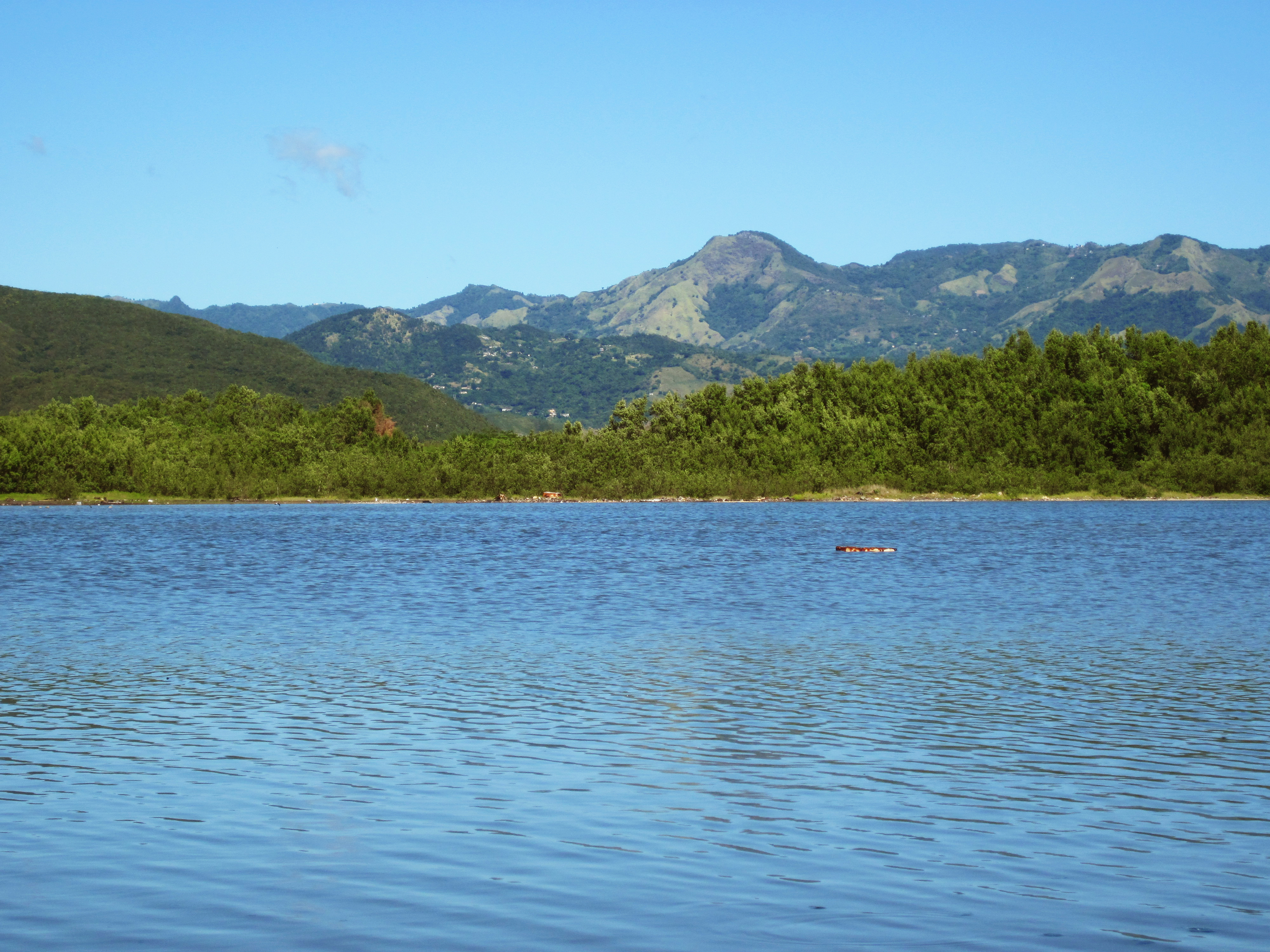
- Guayanilla Bay

- Flag Coat of arms
- Nicknames: "Tierra de Agüeybaná", "Los Corre en Yegua", "Capital Taina"
- Anthem: "Guayanillenses, cantemos unidos"
- Map of Puerto Rico highlighting Guayanilla Municipality
- Coordinates: 18°01′09″N 66°47′31″W
- Sovereign state: United States
- Commonwealth: Puerto Rico
- Settled: 16th century
- Founded: February 27, 1833
- Founder: José de la Cueva y los Santos
- Barrios: 17 barrios: Barrero; Boca; Cedro; Consejo; Guayanilla barrio-pueblo; Indios; Jagua Pasto; Jaguas; Llano; Macaná; Magas; Pasto; Playa; Quebrada Honda; Quebradas; Rufina; Sierra Baja

Government
  - Mayor: Raúl Rivera Rodríguez (PNP)
  - Senatorial dist.: 5 - Ponce
  - Representative dist.: Precinct 58

Area
  - Total: 42.4 sq mi (109.9 km^{2})
- Elevation: 161 ft (49 m)

Population (2020)
  - Total: 17,784
  - Estimate (2025): 16,489 ▼
  - Rank: 63rd in Puerto Rico
  - Density: 419.1/sq mi (161.8/km^{2})
- Demonym: Guayanillenses
- Time zone: UTC−4 (AST)
- ZIP Code: 00656
- Area code: 787/939
- FIPS code: 72-32307
- GNIS feature ID: 1610861

Guayanilla (Spanish pronunciation: [ɡwaʝaˈniʎa], locally [waʝaˈniʝa]) is a town and municipality of Puerto Rico located on the southern coast of the island, bordering the Caribbean Sea, south of Adjuntas, east of Yauco; and west of Peñuelas and about 12 miles (19 km) west of Ponce. Guayanilla is spread over 16 barrios and Guayanilla Pueblo (the downtown area and the administrative center of the city). It is part of the Yauco Metropolitan Statistical Area.

== History ==
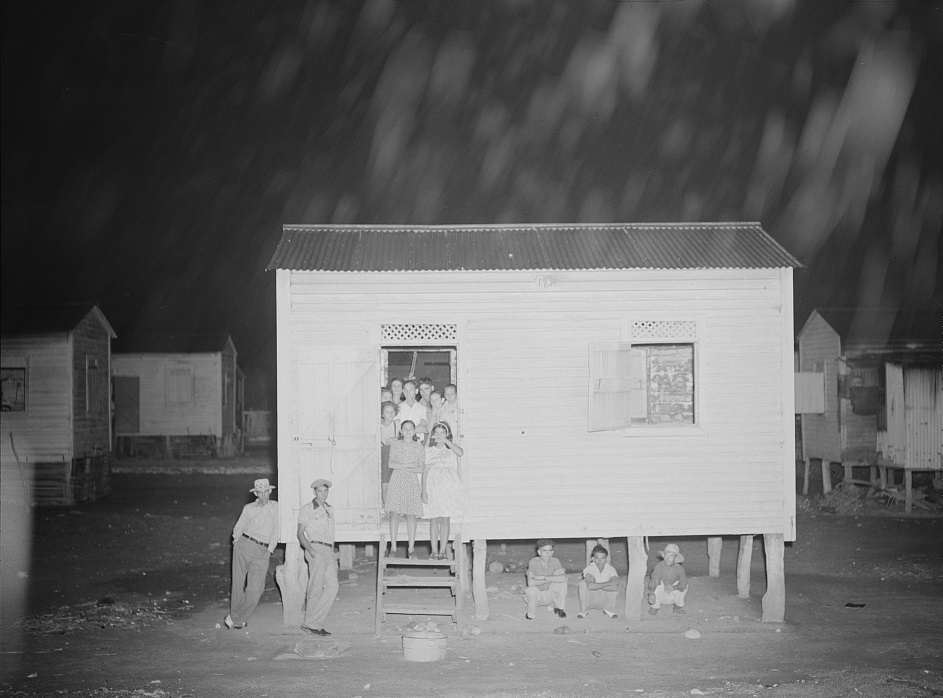
"Guayanilla, Puerto Rico. One of the houses in the company village for sugar cane workers" (1941 photograph by Jack Delano)

Guayanilla was founded by Spanish settlers. The original name was Guadianilla in memory of a river and town of the same name in main land Spain. However, it was changed to Guayanilla due to common mis-pronouncement. The name Guayanilla is derived from Santa María de Guadianilla.

Europeans settlers commence in this area in 1511. In 1756, Yauco was founded as a town. Then Guayanilla was a borough of Yauco. Due to the very fertile lands and access to the local port where most of the local commerce occurred, Guayanilla became an important agricultural center where sugarcane was cultivated. Guayanilla grew quickly and was established as a separate municipality on February 27, 1833 by Governor Miguel de la Torre.

The Autonomous Community of Puerto Rico was ceded by Spain in the aftermath of the invasion and North-American-Spanish War under the terms of the Treaty of Paris of 1898 and became a colony and territory of the United States. In 1899, the United States Department of War conducted a census of Puerto Rico finding that the population of Guayanilla was 9,540.

On September 20, 2017 Hurricane Maria struck Puerto Rico. In Guayanilla, the hurricane triggered numerous landslides and caused major destruction with an estimated 600 homes losing their roof and 300 homes completely destroyed. Roads, crops and structures were destroyed by the winds and flooding.

=== 2019 - 2020 Earthquakes ===
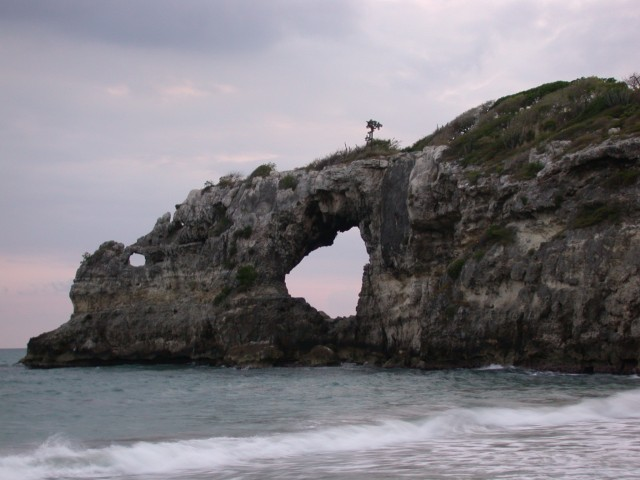
The Punta Ventana landmark, which was destroyed by the 2020 earthquakes

On January 6, 2020 a 5.8 magnitude earthquake was felt in Guayanilla and several structures and cars were destroyed. A family of eight escaped a home that was destroyed by the earthquake.

On January 7, 2020 a 6.4 magnitude earthquake destroyed the Catholic church in Guayanilla Pueblo.

== Geography ==
Guayanilla is located on the southern coast. The coastline forms the Guayanilla Bay, one of the best natural harbors in Puerto Rico, to the south, also. The nearest city is Ponce, which is 12 miles (19 km) to the east. The highest point in the municipality is an unnamed peak in the boundary with Adjuntas that rises to 3,631 feet (1,107 m), just southwest of Monte Guilarte. The northern regions are bordered by mountains that reach 3,300 feet (1,000 m) at the Cordillera Central. In the central regions, the terrain descends where it does not exceed 1,410 feet (430 m). Finally in the coastal plain, the elevations do not exceed 951 feet (290 m). The Yauco, Guayanilla, and Macaná rivers all run through the municipality. The Yauco River briefly runs through the Boca ward in Guayanilla, where its exit into the Caribbean Sea and accompanying marshlands are located.

=== Barrios ===
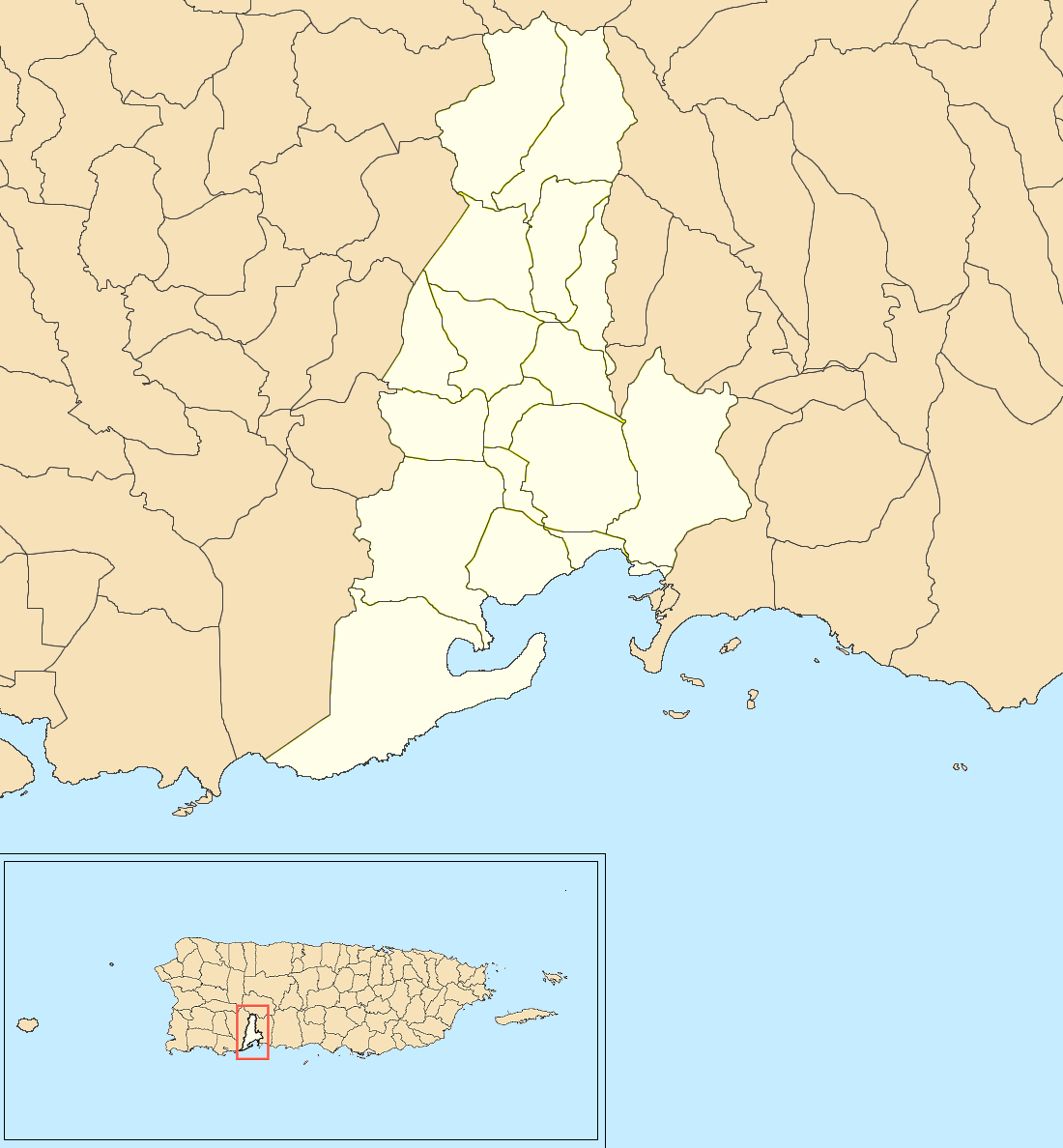
Subdivisions of Guayanilla

Like all municipalities of Puerto Rico, Guayanilla is subdivided into barrios. The municipal buildings, central square and large Catholic church are located in a small barrio referred to as "el pueblo", near the center of the municipality.

1. Barrero
2. Boca
3. Cedro
4. Consejo
5. Guayanilla barrio-pueblo
6. Indios
7. Jagua Pasto
8. Jaguas
9. Llano
10. Macaná
11. Magas
12. Pasto
13. Playa
14. Quebrada Honda
15. Quebradas
16. Rufina
17. Sierra Baja

=== Sectors ===
Barrios (which are, in contemporary times, roughly comparable to minor civil divisions) and subbarrios, are further subdivided into smaller areas called sectores (sectors in English). The types of sectores may vary, from normally sector to urbanización to reparto to barriada to residencial, among others.

=== Special Communities ===
Comunidades Especiales de Puerto Rico (Special Communities of Puerto Rico) are marginalized communities whose citizens are experiencing a certain amount of social exclusion. A map shows these communities occur in nearly every municipality of the commonwealth. Of the 742 places that were on the list in 2014, the following barrios, communities, sectors, or neighborhoods were in Guayanilla: Magas Abajo, Villa del Carmen in Playa barrio, Piedras Blancas, Playita, and San Pedro.

== Tourism ==
To stimulate local tourism, the Puerto Rico Tourism Company launched the Voy Turistiendo ("I'm Touring") campaign, with a passport book and website. The Guayanilla page lists Paseo Tablado Guayacán, Charco Los Peces, and Península del Río, as places of interest.

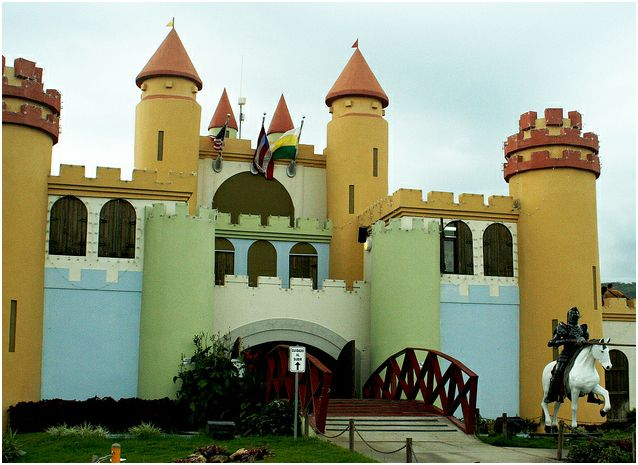
Castillo de niños

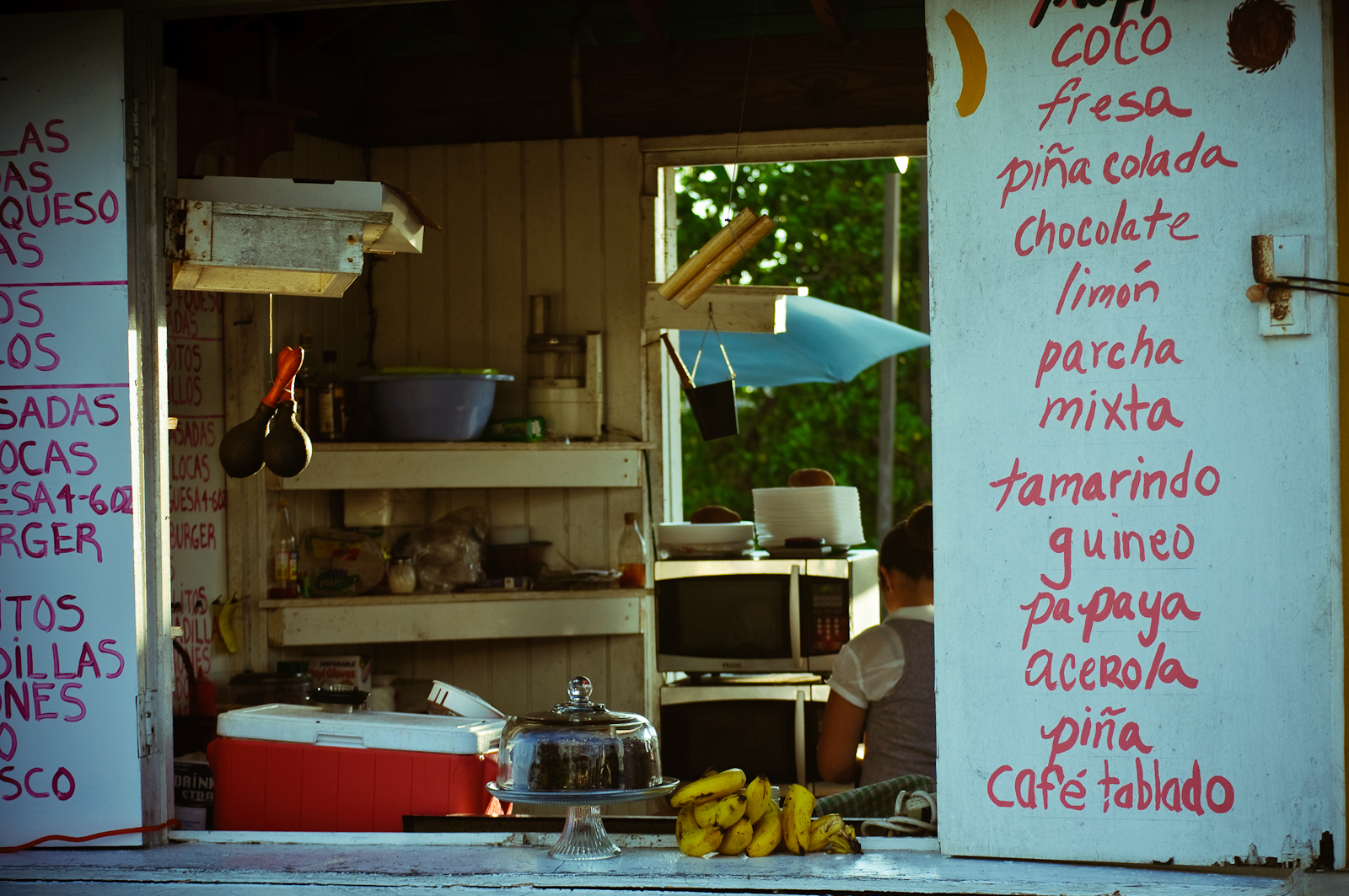
Eatery with piragua (shave ice) flavors menu in Guayanilla

According to a news article by Primera Hora, there are 17 beaches in Guayanilla.

- Places to visit: Mario Mercado Castle, Chorro de Oro Waterfall, El Convento Cave, Guilarte State Forest, Emajagua Beach, La Ventana Beach, Tamarindo Beach, Central Rufina Ruins. El Castillo del Niño (The Child's Castle) amusement park.
- Festivals: Town Carnival (April), Student Festival (May), Beach Festival (May), Cross Festivities (May), Fishing Festival (June), Seafood Festival (June), Our Lady of Mount Carmel Festival (July), Ladies' Marathon (November), Immaculate Conception Festivities (December).

== Economy ==
=== Industry ===
The main industries in Guayanilla are the manufacturing of petrochemicals and the production of electricity by thermoelectrical plants. Guayanilla produces over half of Puerto Rico's electricity. The breakdown of occupations are as follows:

- 22.2% : Educational, medical, and social services
- 14.5% : Public administration
- 14.5% : Construction
- 11.3% : Manufacturing
- 9.6% : Retail trade
- 6.4% : Transportation and warehousing, and utilities
- 5.3% : Arts, entertainment, recreation, accommodation, and food services
- 4.5% : Other services
- 3.6% : Professional, scientific, management, administrative, and waste management services
- 2.9% : Agriculture, forestry, fishing and hunting, and mining
- 2.3% : Finance, insurance, real estate, and rental and leasing
- 1.8% : Wholesale trade
- 1.2% : Information

== Demographics ==
Historical population
Census	Pop.	Note	%±
1900	9,540		—
1910	10,354		8.5%
1920	12,083		16.7%
1930	13,121		8.6%
1940	15,577		18.7%
1950	17,402		11.7%
1960	17,396		0.0%
1970	18,144		4.3%
1980	21,050		16.0%
1990	21,581		2.5%
2000	23,072		6.9%
2010	21,581		−6.5%
2020	17,784		−17.6%
2025 (est.)	16,489	▼	−7.3%
U.S. Decennial Census; 1899 (shown as 1900) 1910-1930; 1930-1950 1960-2000 2010 2020

According to the Census in 2000, 99.2% Hispanic of any race. 65.5% white, 11.1% black, 19.3% mixed, 5.1% other. There were 7,209 households, out of which 40.9% had children under the age of 18 living with them, 57.3% were married couples living together, 21.7% had a female householder with no husband present, and 16.4% were non-families. 15.2% live alone, and 7.1% live alone and were over 65 years of age. The average household size was 3.19, and the average family size was 3.55.

The age distribution of the population was 30.0% under the age of 18, 11.8% from 18 to 24, 26.2% from 25 to 44, 21.2% from 45 to 64, and 10.8% over 65. The median age was 31 years.

The median income for a household was $11,361, and the median income for a family was $13,187. The per capita income for the city was $5,954. 57.0% of the population and 54.9% of the families were below the poverty line.

== Culture ==
=== Festivals and events ===
Guayanilla celebrates its patron saint festival in December. The Fiestas Patronales Inmaculada Concepcion de Maria is a religious and cultural celebration that generally features parades, games, artisans, amusement rides, regional food, and live entertainment.

Other festivals and events celebrated in Guayanilla include:

- Youth Festival – May
- Beach Festival – May
- Cross Festival – May
- Shore Fishing Festival and Triathlon – June
- Virgen del Carmen Festival – June
- Seafood Festival – June
- Farazo Festival – July
- Town Carnival – July
- International Women's Marathon – November

== Government ==
All municipalities in Puerto Rico are administered by a mayor, elected every four years. The current mayor of Guayanilla is Raúl Rivera Rodríguez, of the New Progressive Party (PNP). He was first elected at the 2024 general elections.

The city belongs to the Puerto Rico Senatorial district V, which is represented by two Senators. In 2024, Marially González Huertas and Jamie Barlucea, from the Popular Democratic Party and New Progressive Party, respectively, were elected as District Senators.

== Symbols ==
The municipio has an official flag and coat of arms.

=== Flag ===
This municipality has a flag.

=== Coat of arms ===
This municipality has a coat of arms.

== Education ==
The following schools are located in Guayanilla and students from both schools have participated in the Rose Parade in California on several occasions:

- Escuela Arístides Cales Quirós
- Asunción Rodríguez de Sala

== Transportation ==
There are 35 bridges in Guayanilla.

== Nazario Collection ==
The Nazario Collection, a set of inscribed stones discovered by Catholic priest and amateur archeologist José M. Nazario (and which popular culture links to Taíno chief Agüeybaná II), has become a cultural symbol for the municipality. The statuettes serve as the center piece of Guayanilla's Father Nazario Museum of Lithic Epigraphy.

== Gallery ==
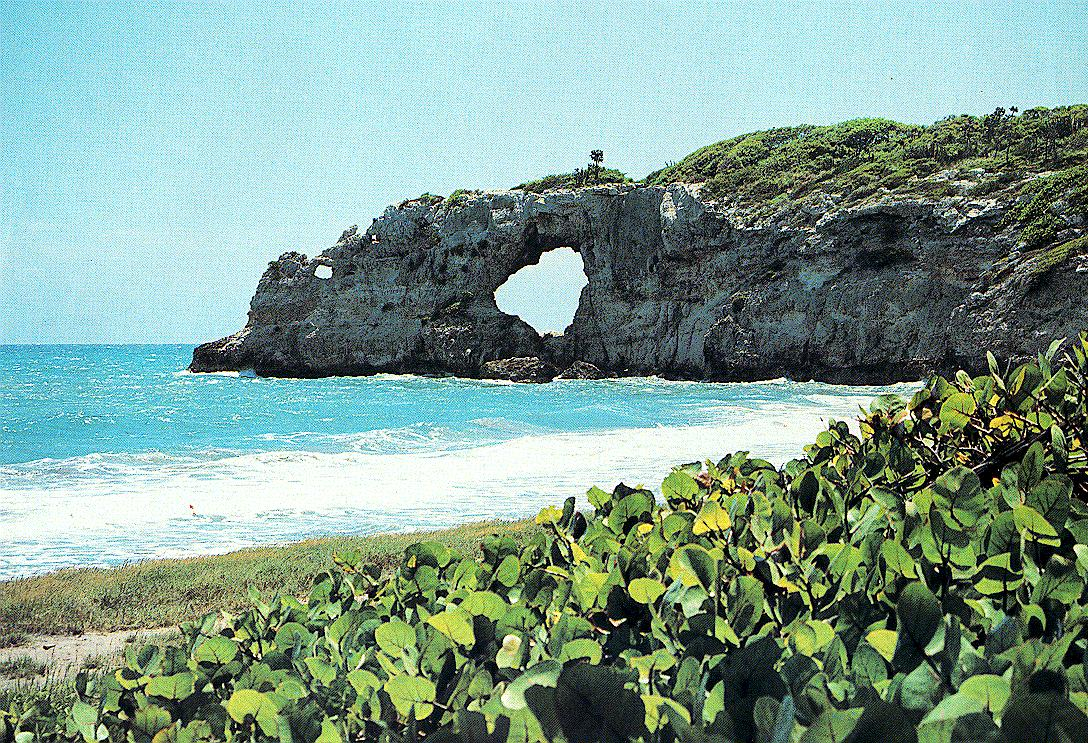
The Punta Ventana window feature collapsed during the 2019 earthquakes.

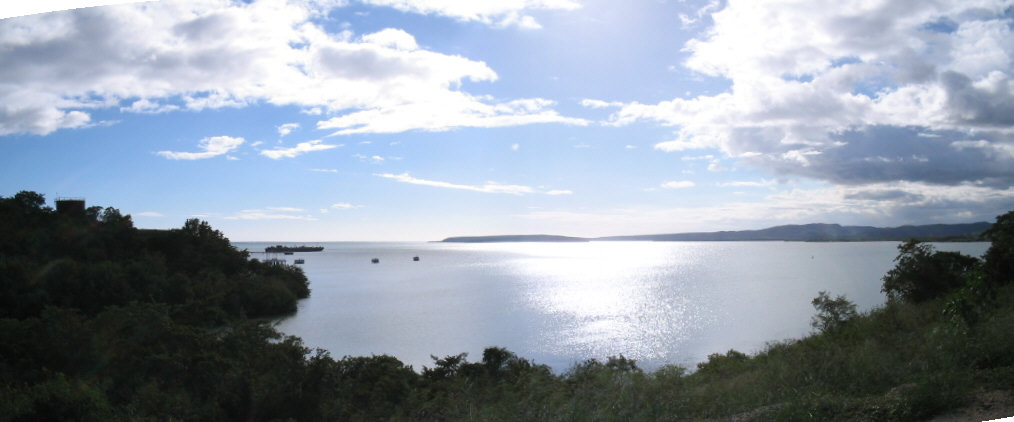
The Caribbean Sea from Guayanilla

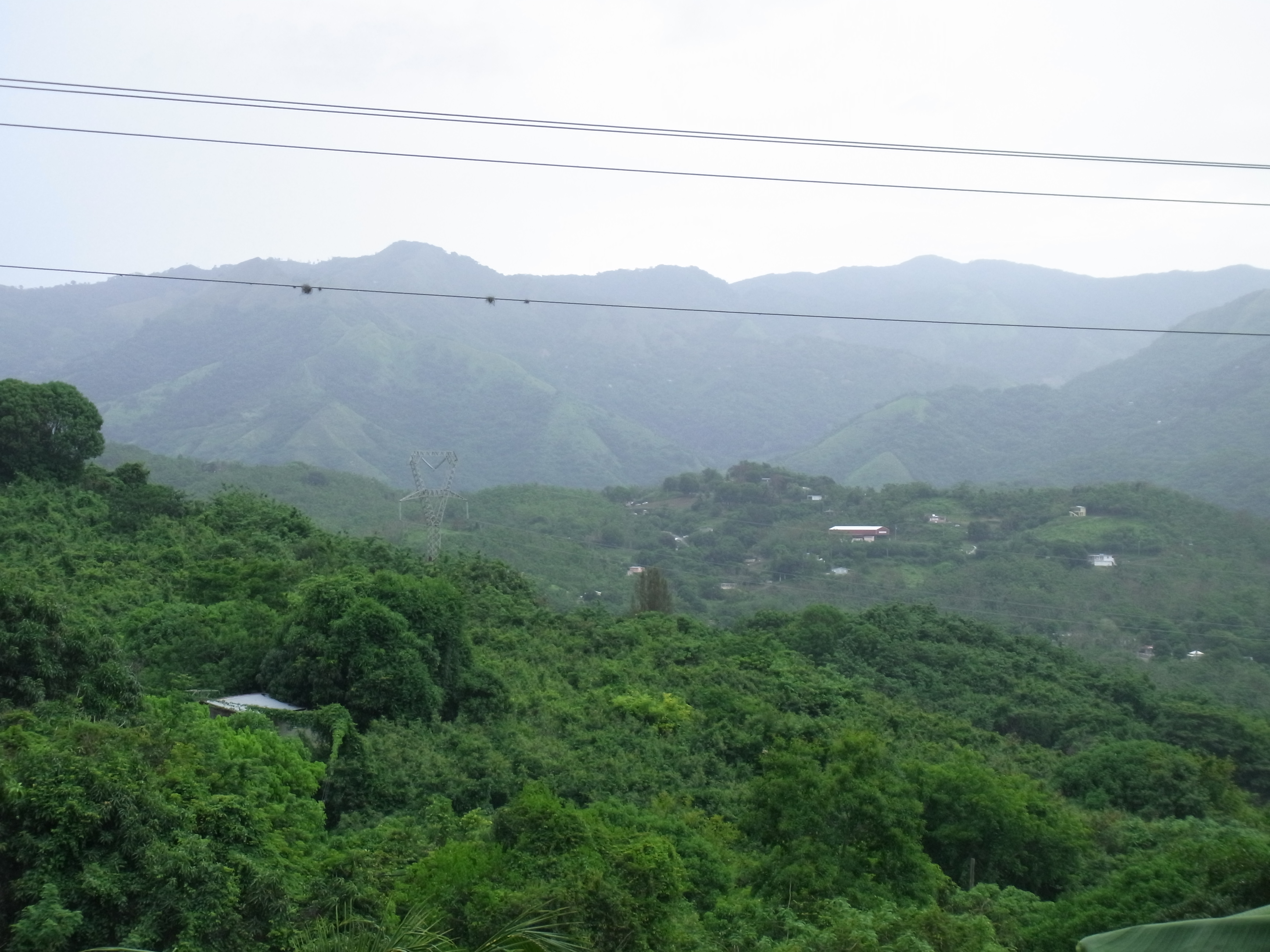
View of mountains in the countryside of Guayanilla

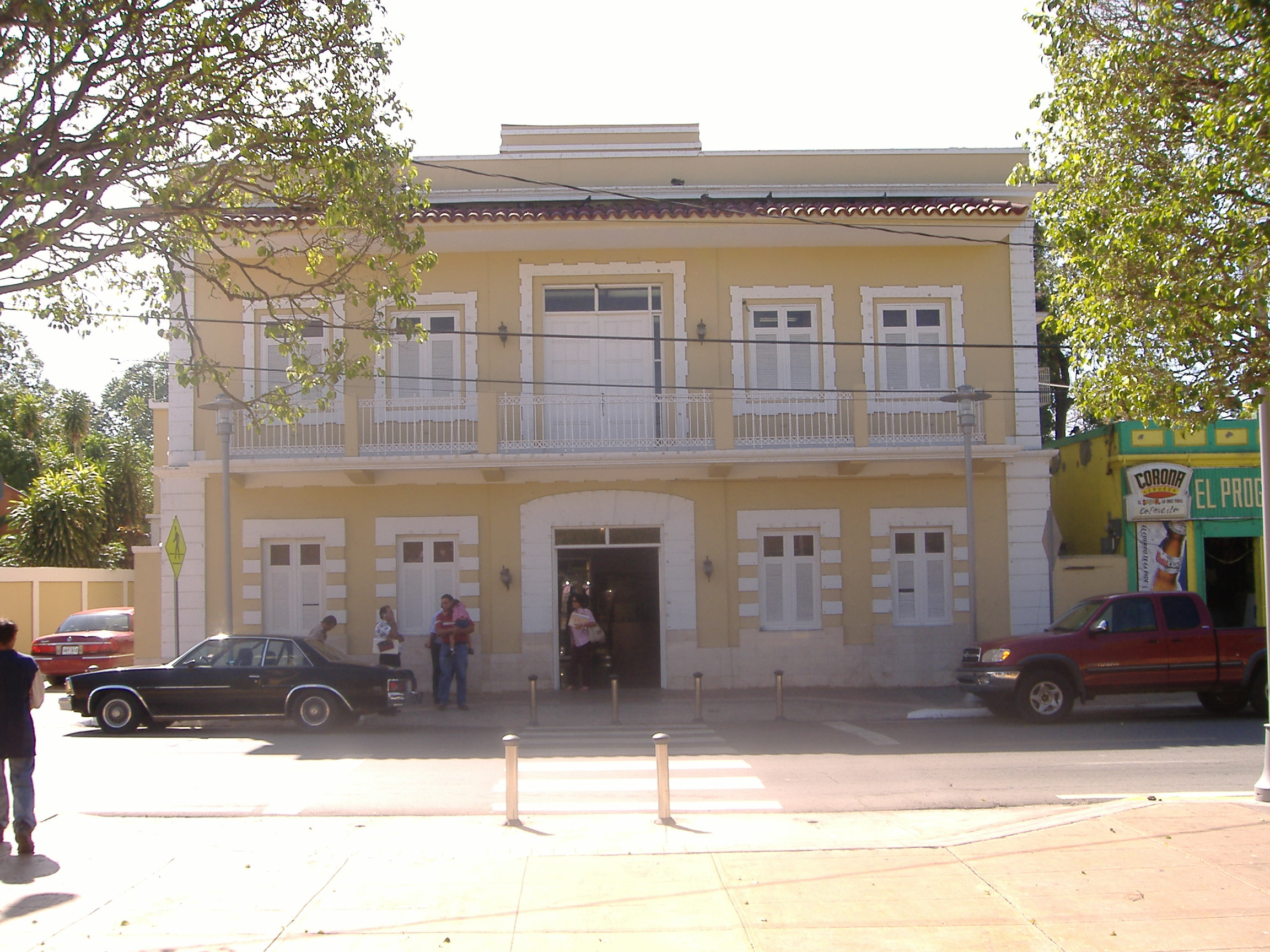
Guayanilla City Hall

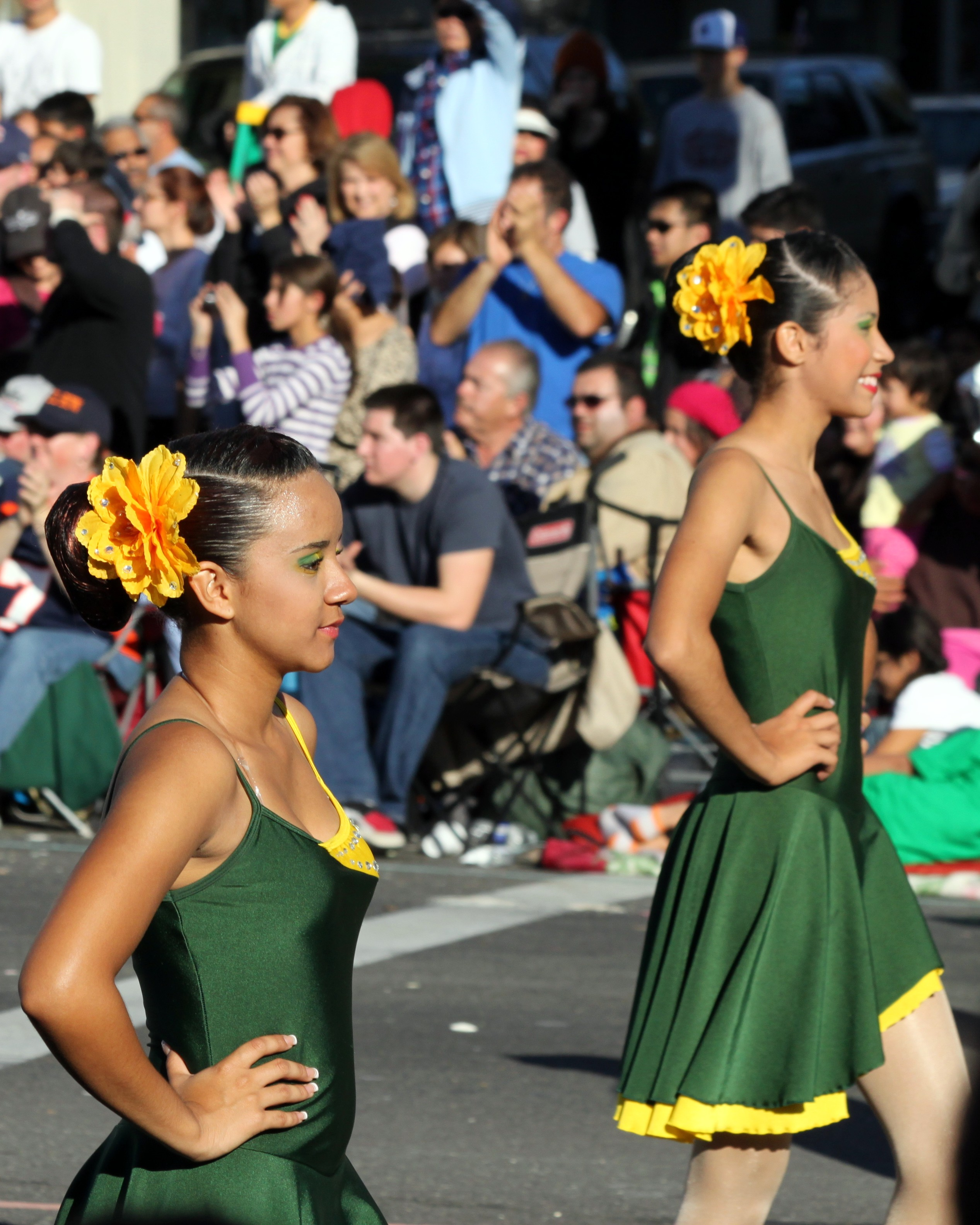
Guayanilla school band performing at a parade in California, US in 2012

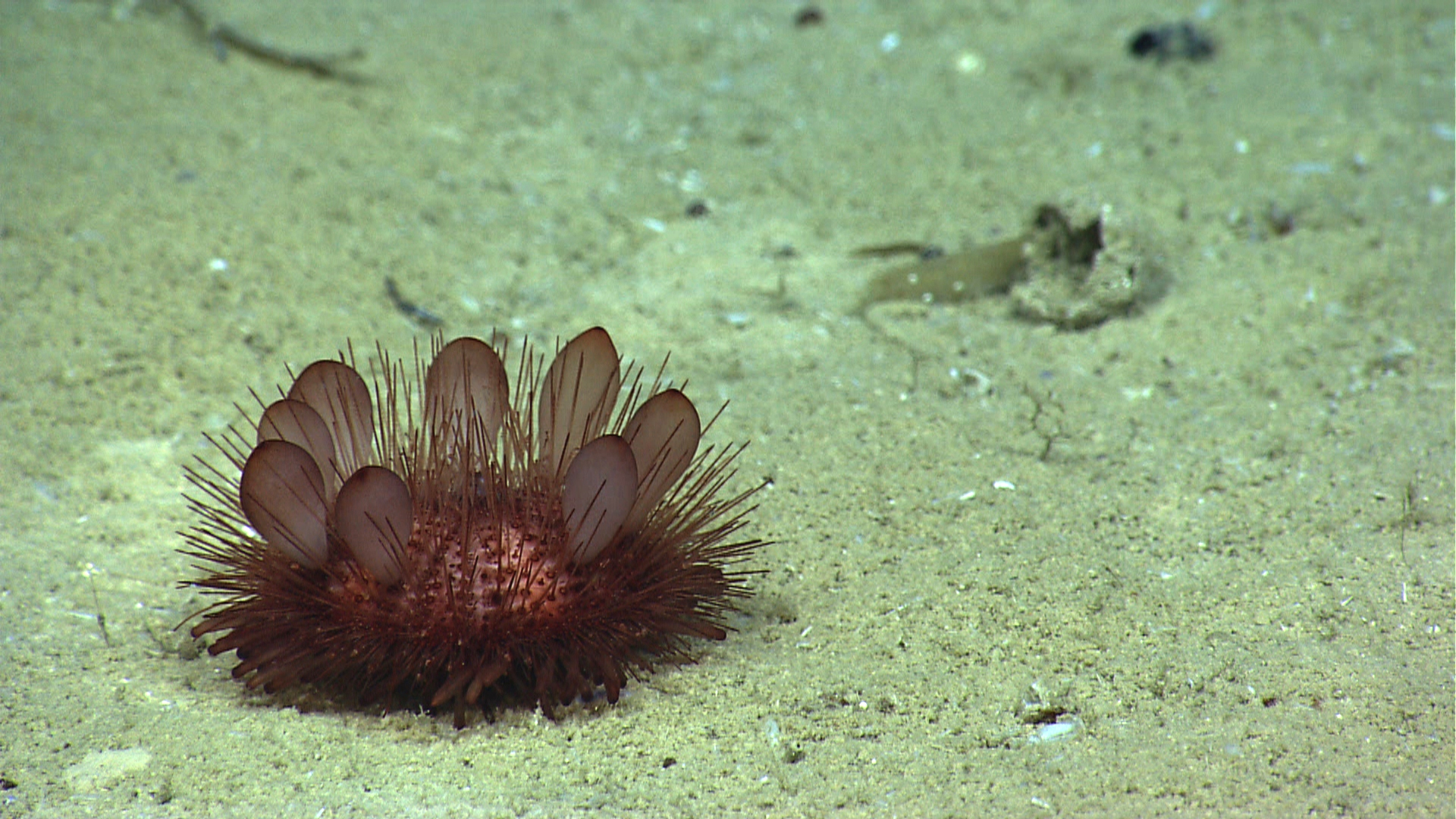
Photo by NOAA, Exploring Puerto Rico's Seamounts, Trenches, and Troughs (Guayanilla)

== See also ==
- List of Puerto Ricans
- History of Puerto Rico
- Did you know-Puerto Rico?
- Municipalities of Puerto Rico
- Corsican immigration to Puerto Rico
- Roanoke Colony
