= Indios, Guayanilla, Puerto Rico =

Barrio of Puerto Rico

Indios
- Barrio
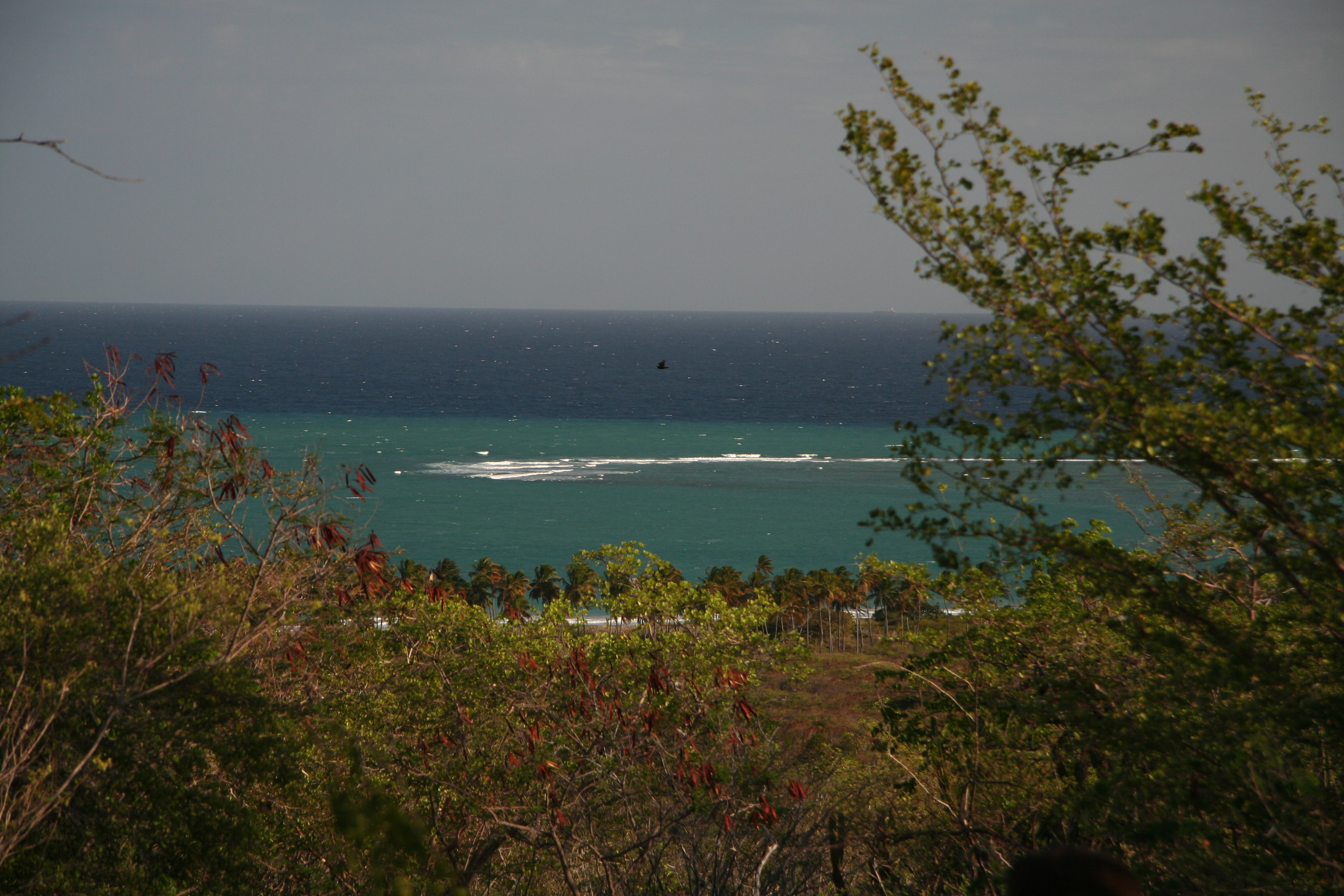
- View of the Caribbean Sea from Indios

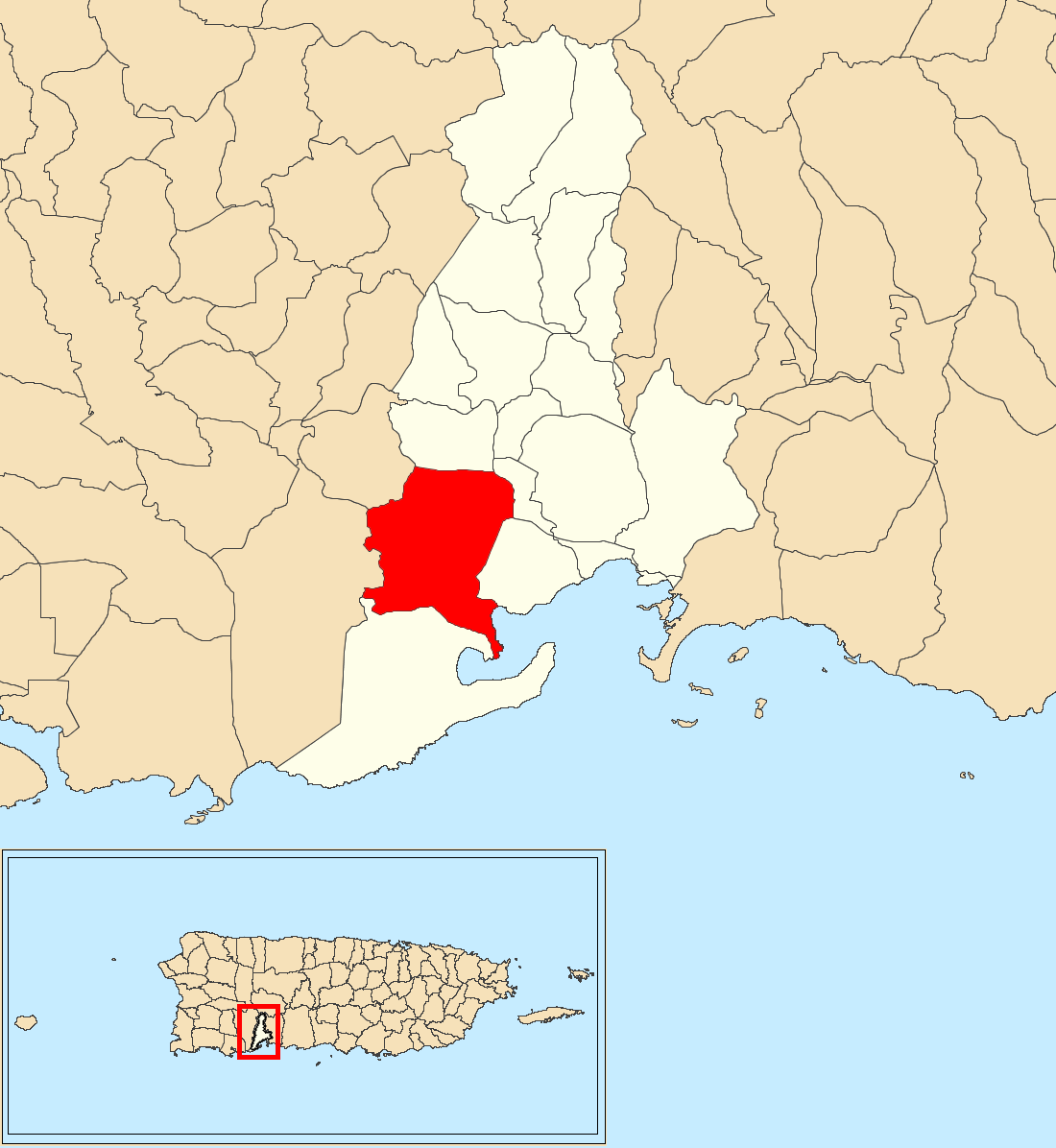
- Location of Indios within the municipality of Guayanilla shown in red

- Location of Puerto Rico
- Coordinates: 18°00′30″N 66°48′37″W
- Commonwealth: Puerto Rico
- Municipality: Guayanilla

Area
  - Total: 5.31 sq mi (13.8 km^{2})
  - Land: 4.78 sq mi (12.4 km^{2})
  - Water: 0.53 sq mi (1.4 km^{2})
- Elevation: 180 ft (55 m)

Population (2010)
  - Total: 2,647
  - Density: 553.8/sq mi (213.8/km^{2})
- Source: 2010 Census
- Time zone: UTC−4 (AST)

Indios is a rural barrio in the municipality of Guayanilla, Puerto Rico. Its population in 2010 was 2,647.

== Features and demographics ==
Indios has 4.78 square miles (12.4 km^{2}) of land area and .53 square miles (1.4 km^{2}) of water area. In 2010, its population was 2,647 with a population density of 553.8 inhabitants per square mile (213.8/km^{2}).

Historical population
| Census | Pop. | Note | %± |
|---|---|---|---|
| 1910 | 411 | | — |
| 1920 | 373 | | −9.2% |
| 1930 | 361 | | −3.2% |
| 1940 | 593 | | 64.3% |
| 1950 | 1,839 | | 210.1% |
| 1960 | 1,443 | | −21.5% |
| 1970 | 1,481 | | 2.6% |
| 1980 | 1,904 | | 28.6% |
| 1990 | 2,318 | | 21.7% |
| 2000 | 2,339 | | 0.9% |
| 2010 | 2,647 | | 13.2% |
U.S. Decennial Census; 1900 (N/A) 1910-1930; 1930-1950 1980-2000 2010

== History ==
Indios was in Spain's gazetteers until Puerto Rico was ceded by Spain in the aftermath of the Spanish–American War under the terms of the Treaty of Paris of 1898 and became an unincorporated territory of the United States. In 1899, the United States Department of War conducted a census of Puerto Rico finding that the combined population of Indios barrio and Boca barrio was 782.

== 2019-2020 earthquakes ==
A series of earthquakes began occurring near Indios on December 28, 2019 and continued through January 2020, with 11 earthquakes over a 5 magnitude (and a 6.4) and 300 over a 3 magnitude in strength.

== Gallery ==
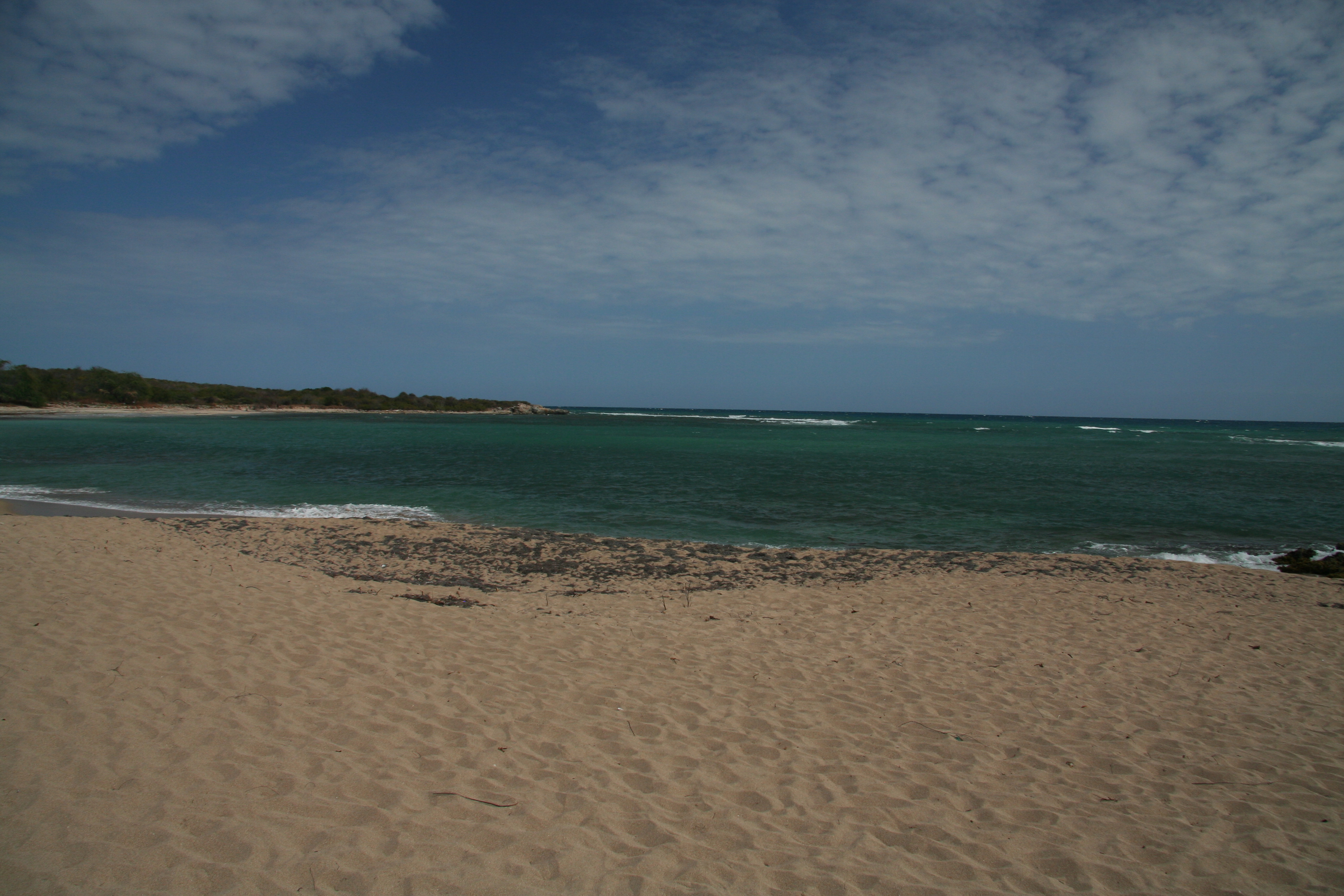
Beach at Indios

== See also ==
- List of communities in Puerto Rico
