= Jagua Pasto =

Barrio of Guayanilla, Puerto Rico

- Barrio
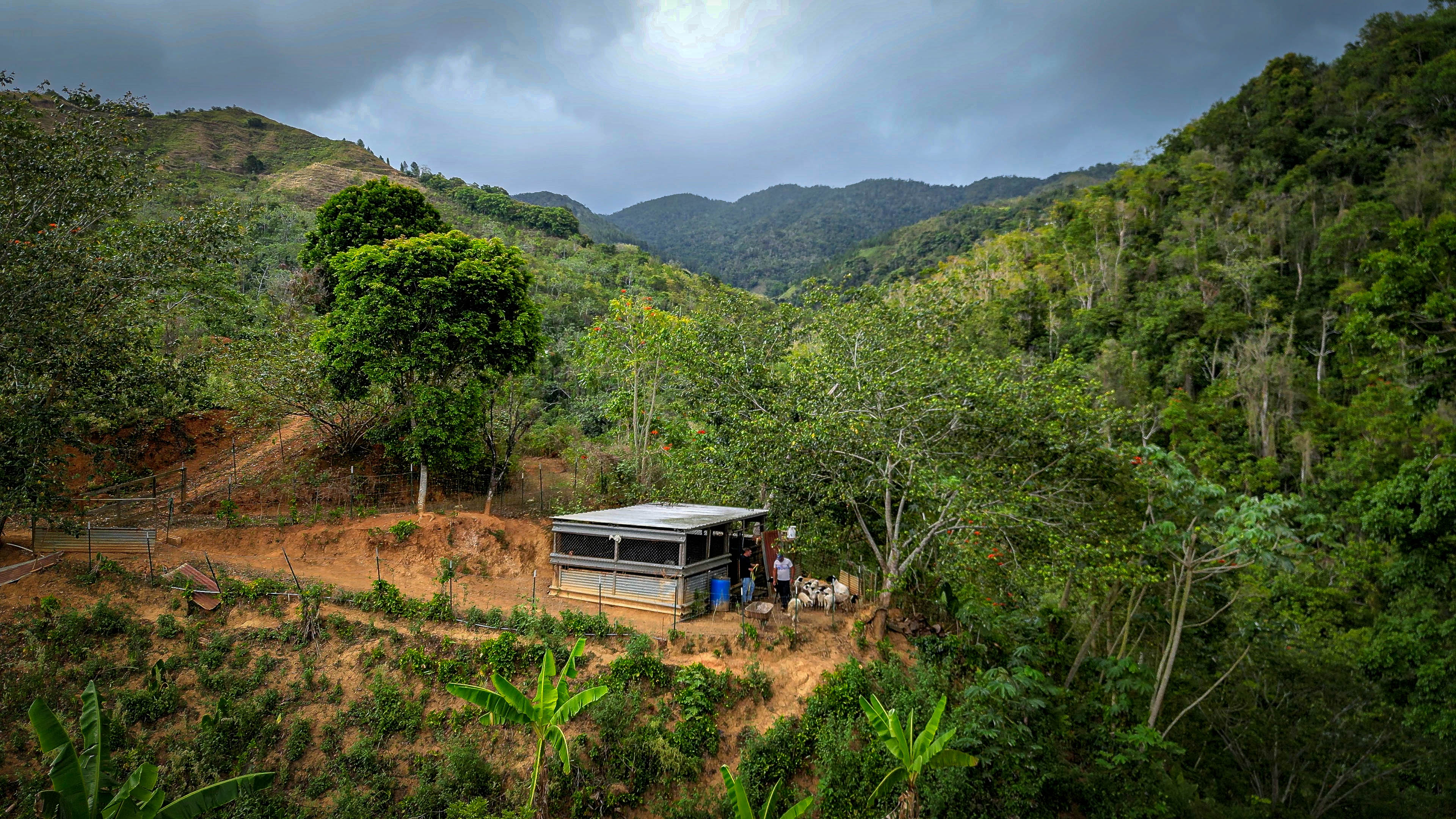
- Farm in Jagua Pasto

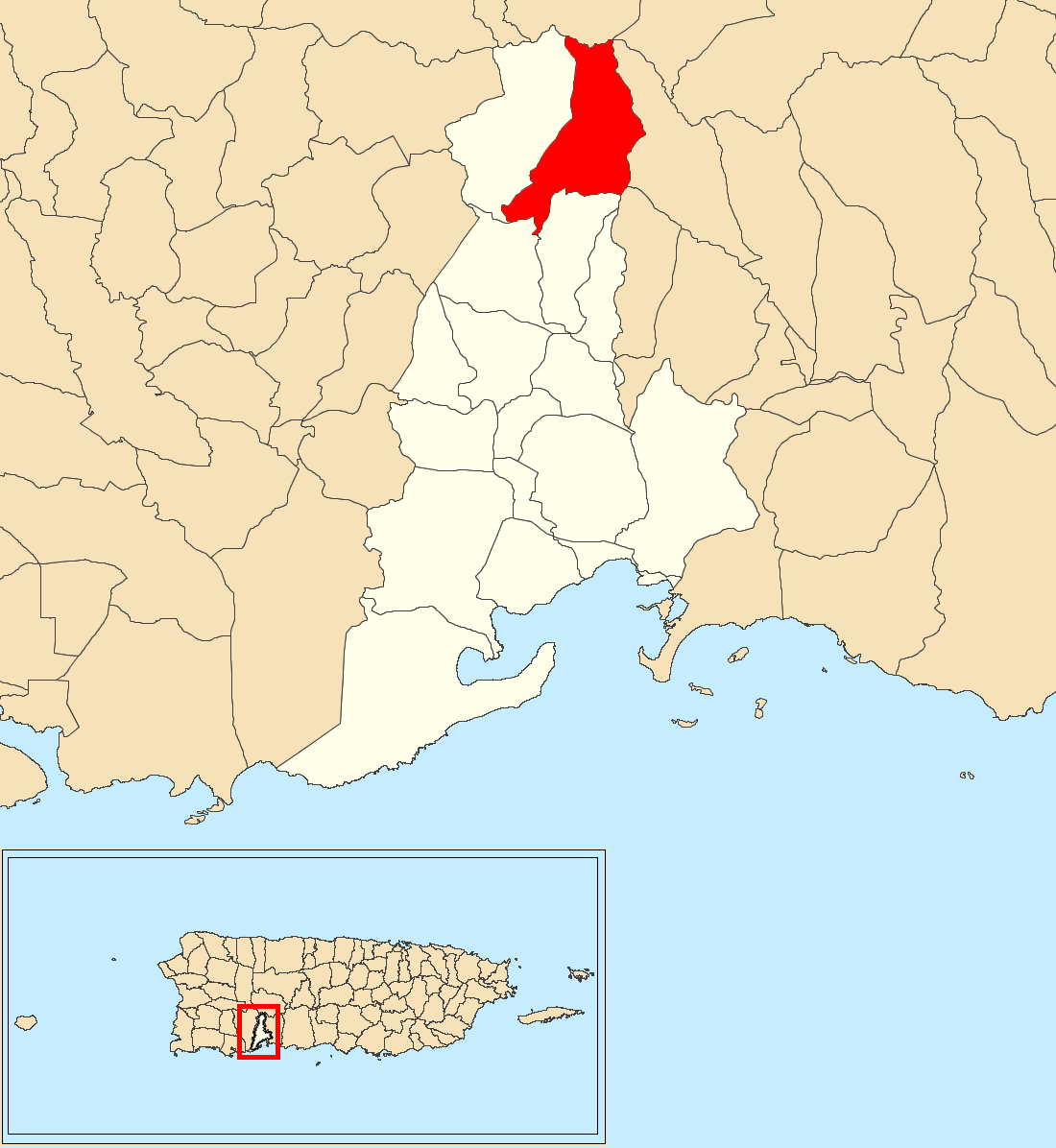
- Location of Jagua Pasto within the municipality of Guayanilla shown in red

- Location of Puerto Rico
- Coordinates: 18°06′38″N 66°46′34″W
- Commonwealth: Puerto Rico
- Municipality: Guayanilla

Area
  - Total: 3.22 sq mi (8.3 km^{2})
  - Land: 3.22 sq mi (8.3 km^{2})
  - Water: 0 sq mi (0 km^{2})
- Elevation: 1,781 ft (543 m)

Population (2010)
  - Total: 108
  - Density: 33.5/sq mi (12.9/km^{2})
- Source: 2010 Census
- Time zone: UTC−4 (AST)

Jagua Pasto is a rural barrio in the municipality of Guayanilla, Puerto Rico. Its population in 2010 was 108.

== Features and demographics ==
Jagua Pasto has 3.22 square miles (8.3 km^{2}) of land area and no water area. In 2010, its population was 108 with a population density of 33.5 inhabitants per square mile (12.9/km^{2}).

Historical population
| Census | Pop. | Note | %± |
|---|---|---|---|
| 1910 | 612 | | — |
| 1920 | 904 | | 47.7% |
| 1930 | 864 | | −4.4% |
| 1940 | 897 | | 3.8% |
| 1950 | 740 | | −17.5% |
| 1960 | 614 | | −17.0% |
| 1970 | 424 | | −30.9% |
| 1980 | 287 | | −32.3% |
| 1990 | 150 | | −47.7% |
| 2000 | 162 | | 8.0% |
| 2010 | 108 | | −33.3% |
U.S. Decennial Census; 1900 (N/A) 1910-1930; 1930-1950 1980-2000 2010

== History ==
Jagua Pasto was in Spain's gazetteers until Puerto Rico was ceded by Spain in the aftermath of the Spanish–American War under the terms of the Treaty of Paris of 1898 and became an unincorporated territory of the United States. In 1899, the United States Department of War conducted a census of Puerto Rico finding that the combined population of Quebrada Honda and Jagua Pasto barrios was 1,467.

== See also ==
- List of communities in Puerto Rico
