= Sierra Baja =

Barrio of Guayanilla, Puerto Rico

- Barrio
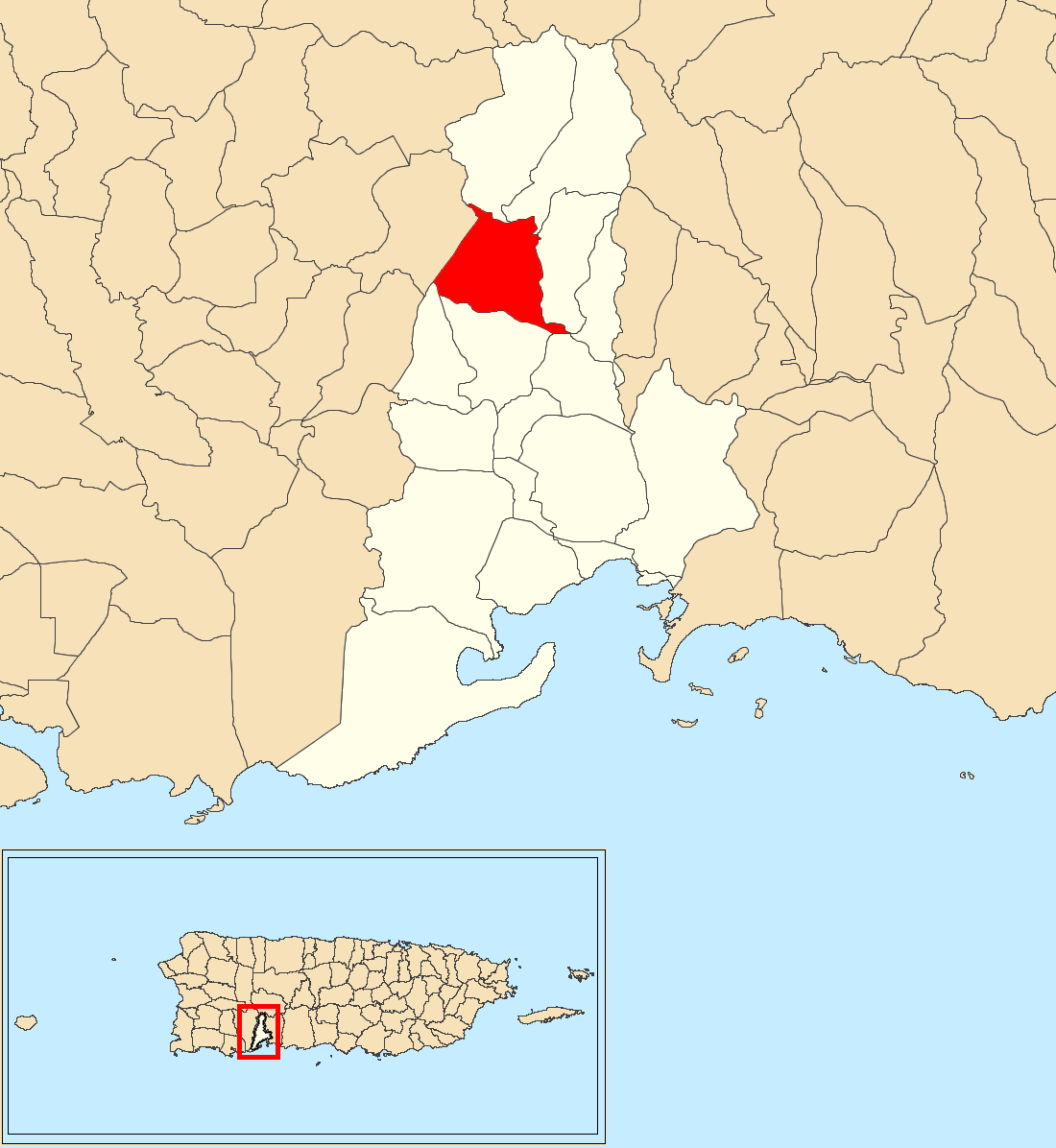
- Location of Sierra Baja within the municipality of Guayanilla shown in red

- Location of Puerto Rico
- Coordinates: 18°04′40″N 66°47′51″W
- Commonwealth: Puerto Rico
- Municipality: Guayanilla

Area
  - Total: 2.37 sq mi (6.1 km^{2})
  - Land: 2.37 sq mi (6.1 km^{2})
  - Water: 0 sq mi (0 km^{2})
- Elevation: 479 ft (146 m)

Population (2010)
  - Total: 602
  - Density: 254/sq mi (98/km^{2})
- Source: 2010 Census
- Time zone: UTC−4 (AST)

Sierra Baja is a rural barrio in the municipality of Guayanilla, Puerto Rico. Its population in 2010 was 602.

== Features and demographics ==
Sierra Baja has 2.37 square miles (6.1 km^{2}) of land area and no water area. In 2010, its population was 602 with a population density of 254 inhabitants per square mile (98/km^{2}).

Historical population
Census	Pop.	Note	%±
1900	787		—
1910	784		−0.4%
1920	877		11.9%
1930	785		−10.5%
1940	872		11.1%
1950	931		6.8%
1960	889		−4.5%
1970	703		−20.9%
1980	630		−10.4%
1990	569		−9.7%
2000	576		1.2%
2010	602		4.5%
U.S. Decennial Census; 1899 (shown as 1900) 1910-1930; 1930-1950 1980-2000 2010

== History ==
Sierra Baja was in Spain's gazetteers until Puerto Rico was ceded by Spain in the aftermath of the Spanish–American War under the terms of the Treaty of Paris of 1898 and became an unincorporated territory of the United States. In 1899, the United States Department of War conducted a census of Puerto Rico finding that the population of Sierra Baja barrio was 787.

== See also ==
- List of communities in Puerto Rico
