= Consejo, Guayanilla, Puerto Rico =

Barrio of Puerto Rico

Consejo
- Barrio
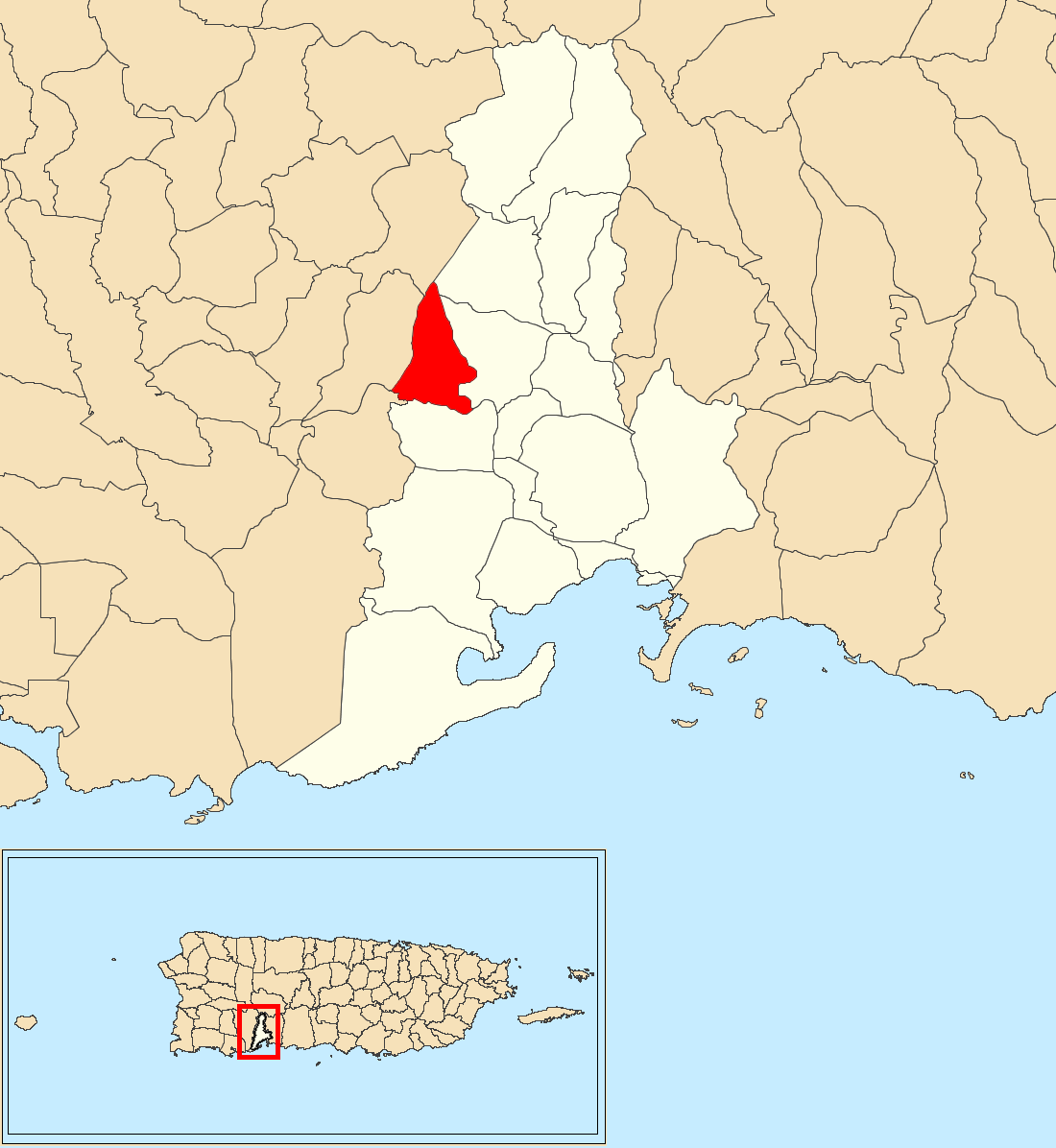
- Location of Consejo within the municipality of Guayanilla shown in red

- Location of Puerto Rico
- Coordinates: 18°03′16″N 66°48′51″W
- Commonwealth: Puerto Rico
- Municipality: Guayanilla

Area
  - Total: 1.51 sq mi (3.9 km^{2})
  - Land: 1.51 sq mi (3.9 km^{2})
  - Water: 0 sq mi (0 km^{2})
- Elevation: 335 ft (102 m)

Population (2010)
  - Total: 886
  - Density: 586.8/sq mi (226.6/km^{2})
- Source: 2010 Census
- Time zone: UTC−4 (AST)

Consejo (Barrio Consejo) is a rural barrio in the municipality of Guayanilla, Puerto Rico. Its population in 2010 was 886.

== Features and demographics ==
Consejo has 1.51 square miles (3.9 km^{2}) of land area and no water area. In 2010, its population was 886 with a population density of 586.8 inhabitants per square mile (226.6/km^{2}).

Historical population
Census	Pop.	Note	%±
1910	457		—
1920	519		13.6%
1930	507		−2.3%
1940	560		10.5%
1950	727		29.8%
1960	548		−24.6%
1970	459		−16.2%
1980	799		74.1%
1990	723		−9.5%
2000	883		22.1%
2010	886		0.3%
U.S. Decennial Census; 1900 (N/A) 1910–1930; 1930–1950 1980–2000 2010

== History ==
Collores was in Spain's gazetteers until Puerto Rico was ceded by Spain in the aftermath of the Spanish–American War under the terms of the Treaty of Paris of 1898 and became an unincorporated territory of the United States. In 1899, the United States Department of War conducted a census of Puerto Rico finding that the combined population of Consejo (which was Concejo) barrio and Jaguas (which was Jagua) barrio was 1,162.

== See also ==
- List of communities in Puerto Rico
