= Pasto, Guayanilla, Puerto Rico =

Barrio of Puerto Rico

Pasto
- Barrio
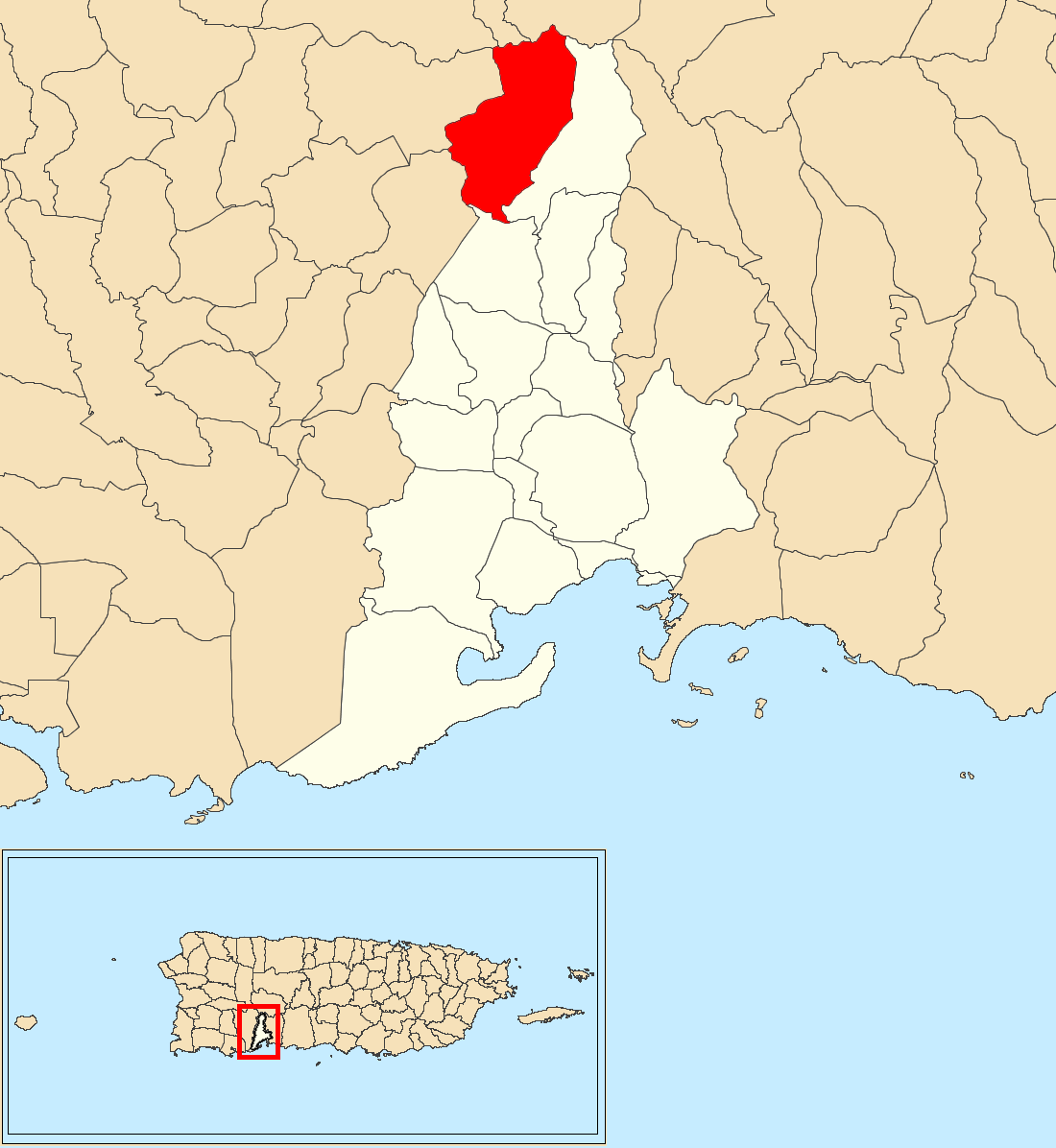
- Location of Pasto within the municipality of Guayanilla shown in red

- Location of Puerto Rico
- Coordinates: 18°06′49″N 66°47′39″W
- Commonwealth: Puerto Rico
- Municipality: Guayanilla

Area
  - Total: 3.83 sq mi (9.9 km^{2})
  - Land: 3.83 sq mi (9.9 km^{2})
  - Water: 0 sq mi (0 km^{2})
- Elevation: 1,890 ft (580 m)

Population (2010)
  - Total: 327
  - Density: 85.4/sq mi (33.0/km^{2})
- Source: 2010 Census
- Time zone: UTC−4 (AST)

Pasto is a rural barrio in the municipality of Guayanilla, Puerto Rico. Its population in 2010 was 327.

== Features and demographics ==
Pasto has 3.83 square miles (9.9 km^{2}) of land area and no water area. In 2010, its population was 327 with a population density of 85.4 inhabitants per square mile (33.0/km^{2}).

Historical population
Census	Pop.	Note	%±
1900	1,276		—
1910	1,235		−3.2%
1920	1,321		7.0%
1930	1,204		−8.9%
1940	1,302		8.1%
1950	1,152		−11.5%
1960	987		−14.3%
1970	645		−34.7%
1980	393		−39.1%
1990	440		12.0%
2000	360		−18.2%
2010	327		−9.2%
U.S. Decennial Census; 1899 (shown as 1900) 1910-1930; 1930-1950 1980-2000 2010

== History ==
Pasto was in Spain's gazetteers until Puerto Rico was ceded by Spain in the aftermath of the Spanish–American War under the terms of the Treaty of Paris of 1898 and became an unincorporated territory of the United States. In 1899, the United States Department of War conducted a census of Puerto Rico finding that the population of Pasto barrio was 1,276.

== See also ==
- List of communities in Puerto Rico
