= Jaguas, Guayanilla, Puerto Rico =

Barrio of Puerto Rico

Jaguas
- Barrio
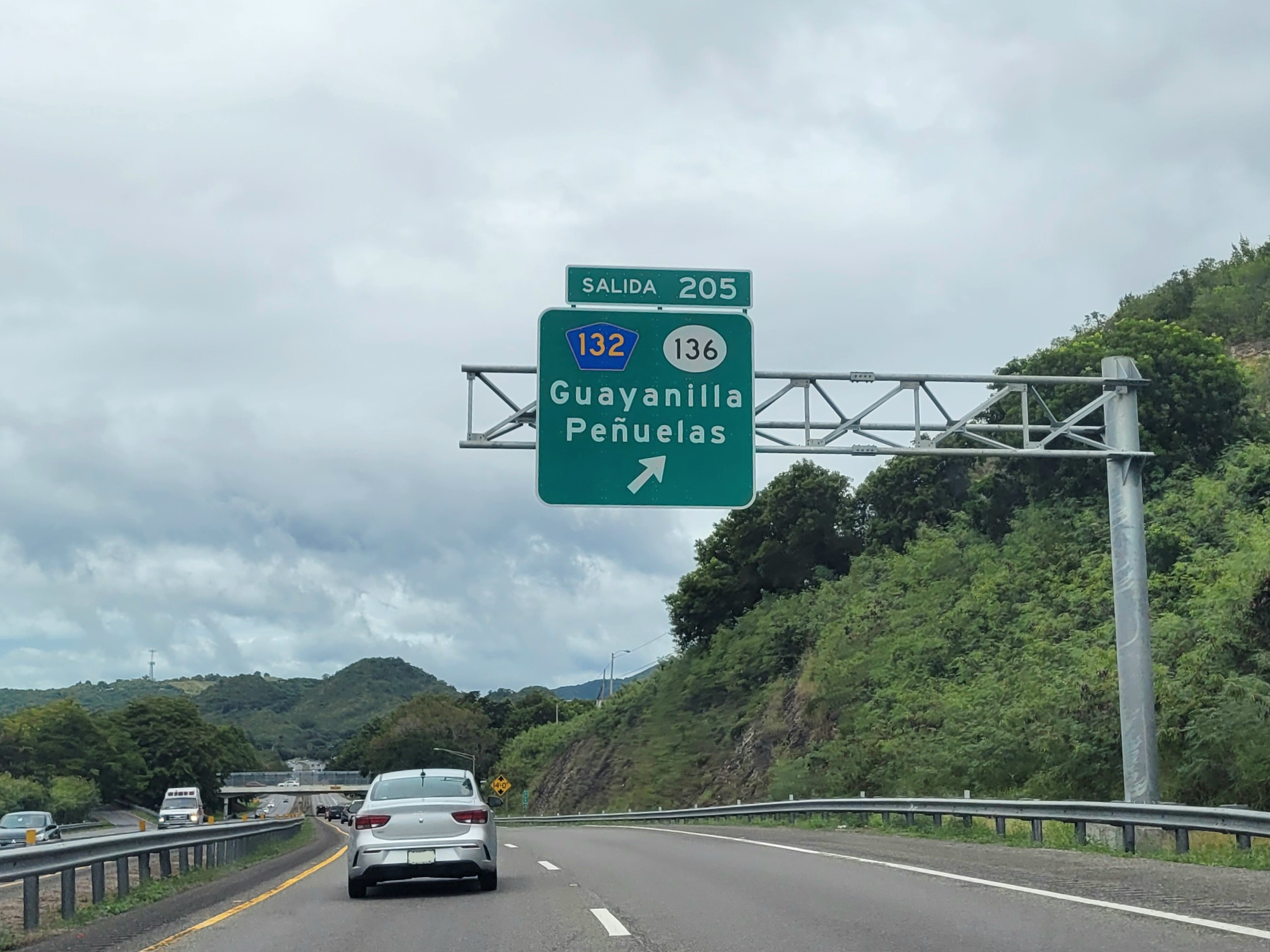
- Puerto Rico Highway 2 between Magas and Jaguas

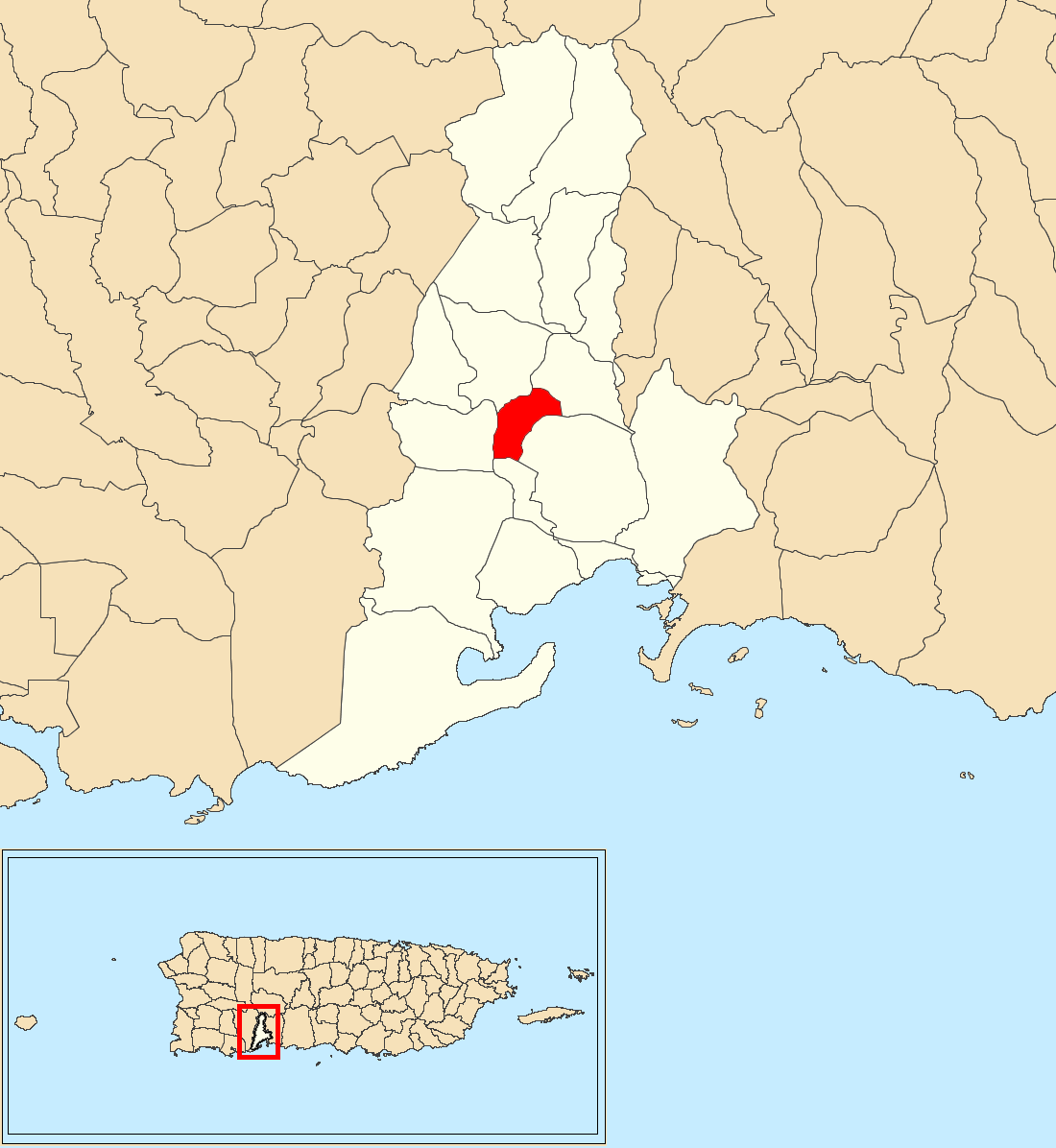
- Location of Jaguas within the municipality of Guayanilla shown in red

- Location of Puerto Rico
- Coordinates: 18°02′26″N 66°47′30″W
- Commonwealth: Puerto Rico
- Municipality: Guayanilla

Area
  - Total: 0.72 sq mi (1.9 km^{2})
  - Land: 0.72 sq mi (1.9 km^{2})
  - Water: 0 sq mi (0 km^{2})
- Elevation: 371 ft (113 m)

Population (2010)
  - Total: 1,413
  - Density: 1,962.5/sq mi (757.7/km^{2})
- Source: 2010 Census
- Time zone: UTC−4 (AST)

Jaguas is a rural barrio in the municipality of Guayanilla, Puerto Rico. Its population in 2010 was 1,413.

== Features and demographics ==
Jaguas has .72 square miles (1.9 km^{2}) of land area and no water area. In 2010, its population was 1,413 with a population density of 1,962.5 inhabitants per square mile (757.7/km^{2}).

Historical population
| Census | Pop. | Note | %± |
|---|---|---|---|
| 1910 | 946 | | — |
| 1920 | 1,275 | | 34.8% |
| 1930 | 1,457 | | 14.3% |
| 1940 | 587 | | −59.7% |
| 1950 | 309 | | −47.4% |
| 1960 | 386 | | 24.9% |
| 1970 | 268 | | −30.6% |
| 1980 | 597 | | 122.8% |
| 1990 | 608 | | 1.8% |
| 2000 | 1,276 | | 109.9% |
| 2010 | 1,413 | | 10.7% |
U.S. Decennial Census; 1900 (N/A) 1910-1930; 1930-1950 1980-2000 2010

== History ==
Jaguas was in Spain's gazetteers until Puerto Rico was ceded by Spain in the aftermath of the Spanish–American War under the terms of the Treaty of Paris of 1898 and became an unincorporated territory of the United States. In 1899, the United States Department of War conducted a census of Puerto Rico finding that the combined population of Consejo (which was Concejo) barrio and Jaguas (which was Jagua) barrio was 1,162.

== See also ==
- List of communities in Puerto Rico
